= Ainu people =

Ethnic group in Japan and Russia

Ainu
アイヌ
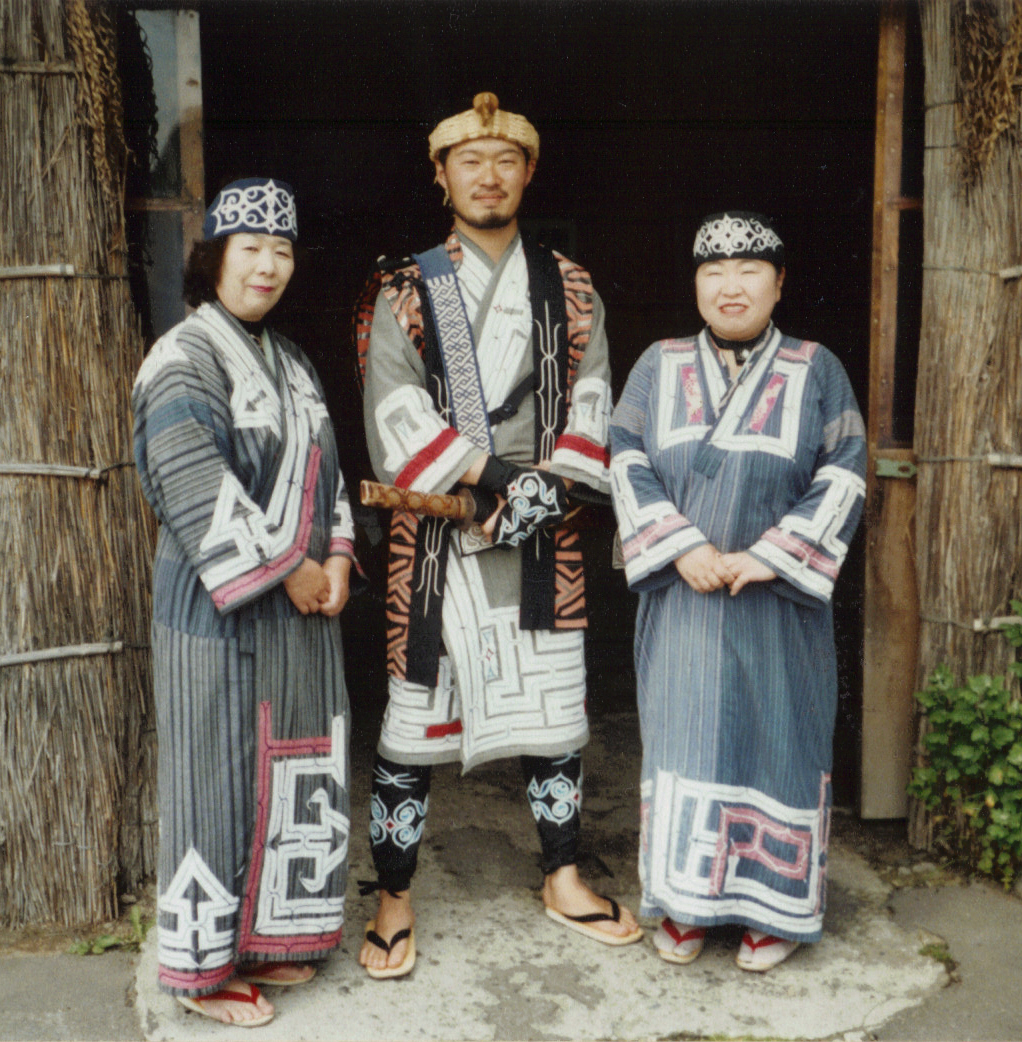
- Ainu people in front of a traditional building in Shiraoi, Hokkaido

Regions with significant populations
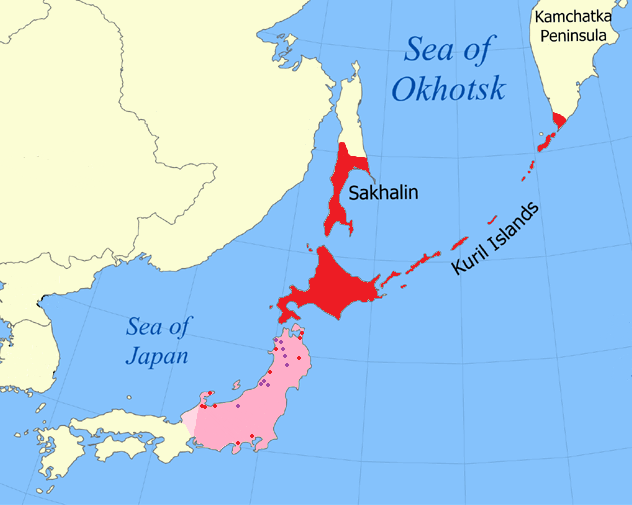
- Historical homeland and distribution
- Japan (Hokkaido): 11,450 surveyed in 2023
- Russia (Kamchatka, Khabarovsk, Sakhalin): 300 (2021 census)

Languages
- Ainu languages, Japanese, Russian

Religion
- Ainu folk religion, Animism, Japanese Buddhism, Shinto, Russian Orthodoxy

Related ethnic groups
- Jomon, Satsumon, Okhotsk, Matagi, Kamchadals, Emishi, Nivkh

The Ainu (/ˈaɪnuː/) are an indigenous ethnic group who reside in northern Japan and southeastern Russia, including Hokkaido and the Tōhoku region of Honshu, as well as the land surrounding the Sea of Okhotsk, such as Sakhalin, the Kuril Islands, the Kamchatka Peninsula, and the Khabarovsk Krai. They have occupied these areas, known to them as "Ainu Mosir" (Ainu: アイヌモシㇼ, lit. 'the land of the Ainu'), since before the arrival of the modern Yamato and Russians. These regions are often referred to as Ezochi (蝦夷地) and its inhabitants as Emishi (蝦夷) in historical Japanese texts. Along with the Yamato and Ryukyuan ethnic groups, the Ainu people are one of the primary historic ethnic groups of Japan and are, along with the Ryukyuans and Bonin Islanders, one of the few ethnic minorities native to the Japanese archipelago.

Official surveys of the known Ainu population in Hokkaido received 11,450 responses in 2023, and the Ainu population in Russia was estimated at 300 in 2021. Unofficial estimates in 2002 placed the total population in Japan at 200,000 or higher, as the near-total assimilation of the Ainu into Japanese society has resulted in many individuals of Ainu descent having no knowledge of their ancestry.

The Ainu were subject to forced assimilation during the Japanese colonization of Hokkaido since at least the 18th century. Japanese assimilation policies in the 19th century around the Meiji Restoration included forcing Ainu peoples off their land. This, in turn, forced them to give up traditional ways of life such as subsistence hunting and fishing. Ainu people were not allowed to practice their religion and were placed into Japanese-language schools, where speaking the Hokkaido Ainu language was forbidden. In 1966, there were about 300 native Ainu speakers, and in the 1980s, only 15 people were known to speak the language daily. The Hokkaido Ainu language is likely extinct today, as there remain no known native speakers. The other Ainu languages, Sakhalin Ainu and Kuril Ainu, were declared extinct in the 20th century. In recent years, there have been increasing efforts to revitalize the Hokkaido Ainu language.

== Names ==
This people's most widely known ethnonym, Aynu (Ainu: アイヌ; Japanese: アイヌ; Russian: Айны), means "human being" or "person" in the Ainu language, particularly as opposed to kamuy, "divine beings". The word utari, meaning "relatives", "companions", or "fellow people", was also adopted as a collective designation, particularly during the twentieth century when the word "Ainu" was often used abusively in Japanese society. Official documents use both names.

The Sakhalin Ainu used the autonym Enchiw to distinguish themselves from other Ainu communities.

The name first appeared as Aino in a 1591 Latin manuscript titled De yezorum insula held in the Roman archives of the Society of Jesus in Rome. This document gives the native name of Hokkaido as Aino moxori, or Ainu mosir, "land of the Ainu". The terms Aino and Ainu did not come into common use as ethnonyms until the early 19th century. The ethnonym first appeared in an 1819 German encyclopedia article. Neither European nor Japanese sources conceived of the Ainu as a distinct ethnic group until the late 1700s.

The Ainu were also called the Kuye by their neighbors. The Qing dynasty called Sakhalin Kuyedao ("island of the Ainu"). The island was also called Kuye Fiyaka. The word Kuye used by the Qing is "most probably related to kuyi, the name given to the Sakhalin Ainu by their Nivkh and Nanai neighbors." When the Ainu migrated onto the mainland, the Chinese described a "strong Kui (or Kuwei, Kuwu, Kuye, Kugi, i.e. Ainu) presence in the area otherwise dominated by the Gilemi or Jilimi (Nivkh and other Amur peoples)." Related names were in widespread use in the region, for example, the Kuril Ainu called themselves both kuri(l) and koushi; the former was adopted as an exonym by neighboring peoples, including in Chinese and Japanese.

An exonym applied to the Ainu people in the 8th century Nihon Shoki is 蝦夷 (Emi_{1}si), written with the characters 蝦 "shrimp" and 夷 "barbarian" (Chinese Yi, "barbaric outsider from Korea, Japan, etc."), though it also uses the characters 毛人 "hairy people" once.

The 13th-century Shaku Nihongi later claimed that the Ainu called themselves Emishi, but this understanding may have derived from the Sakhalin Ainu word Enchiw. The term is considered derogatory in modern usage.

== History ==
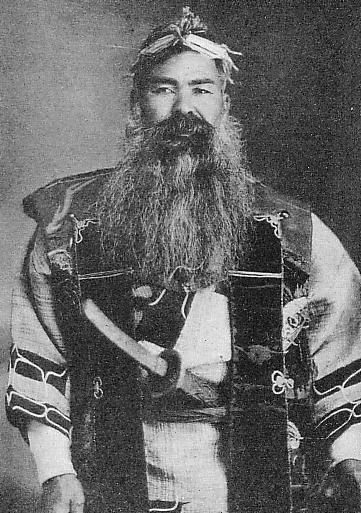
Hokkaido Ainu clan leader, 1930

The Ainu are considered the native people of Hokkaido, southern Sakhalin, and the Kurils. Ainu toponyms support the historical view that the Ainu people lived in several places throughout northern Honshu. The ancestors of the Ainu, who were referred to as Emishi, came under Japanese subjugation starting in the 9th century and were pushed to the northern islands.

=== Nibutani ("Ainu") period ===
Following the Epi-Jōmon, which began in the 5th century BC in northern Honshū and Ezo, and the subsequent Satsumon culture of the Tōhoku and Ezo until around the 13th century, was the "Ainu culture period" or "Nibutani period". The Epi-Jōmon peoples had been pushed east by the Yayoi culture and the subsequent Kofun period, during which the Yamato Kingship defeated its rivals. The following era is Heian Japan. The ethnic Japanese are known as Yamato people after this state.

Ainu culture is a heterogeneous mixture of elements of different origins and very different chronological depths. The three main components are, however, easily identifiable. First, at the bottom, the Ainu preserve cultural elements dating back to the Jōmon period. Some of these elements may have travelled northwards from Honshu to Hokkaido together with the Satsumon culture, while others may represent direct heritage from the local Epi-Jōmon populations of Hokkaido. [T]hese elements [...] are likely to be connected with details of subsistence economy, social structure, and general world view, as also reflected in the native lexicon of the Ainu language. Second, during the prolonged interaction with the expansive Japanese-speaking population, the Ainu have acquired a layer of Japanese cultural elements, pertaining to both material and spiritual heritage. Some of these elements were acquired on Honshu soon after the appearance of the Japonic-speaking Yayoi population, while others penetrated northwards later during the interaction between the expanding Japanese and the Hokkaido Ainu[.] Of course[,] the Ainu, or other Jōmon and Epi-Jōmon populations, have also contributed to the evolution of what we today know as Japanese culture[.] Third, and very significantly, the Ainu ethnic culture contains a strong northern element, acquired through contact with the Okhotsk population, whose last traces were absorbed into the Ainu ethnicity.

The Ainu engaged in transit trade between Honshu and Northeast Asia. Very active contact between the Yamato and the Ainu of Ezo (now known as Hokkaidō) began in this period. The Ainu had largely abandoned agriculture for hunting-gathering, including hunting sika deer and the very large Ussuri brown bear, salmon fishing, gathering shellfish and edible seaweed, and even hunting harbor and spotted seals. Their religious practices were focused on natural phenomena much like Yamato practices alongside Buddhism, and shared features with neighboring indigenous peoples of Siberia such as the Oroks and the Nivkh such as shaved wooden carvings (inau).

After the Mongol conquest of the Jin dynasty in 1234, the Nivkh and Udege repeatedly raided the Ainu of Northern Sakhalin. In response, the Mongols established an administration post at Nurgan (now Tyr, Russia) at the junction of the Amur and Amgun rivers in 1263, and forced the submission of the two peoples. In 1264, the Northern Sakhalin peoples invaded Nivkh territory. They also started an expedition into the Amur region, which was then controlled by the Mongol-ruled Yuan dynasty, resulting in reprisals by the Mongols on Sakhalin.

From the Nivkh perspective, their surrender to the Mongols essentially established a military alliance against the Ainu, who had invaded their lands. According to the History of Yuan, a group of people known as the Guwei (骨嵬; Gǔwéi, the phonetic approximation of the Nivkh name for Ainu) from Sakhalin invaded and fought with the Jilimi (Nivkh) every year. On November 30, 1264, the Mongols attacked the Ainu. The Northern Sakhalin Ainu resisted the Mongols, but by 1308 had been subdued. They paid tribute to the Yuan dynasty at posts in Wuliehe, Nanghar, and Boluohe.

The Chinese Ming dynasty (1368–1644) took control of the Amur region in 1387 and established the Nurgan Regional Military Commission outpost near the ruins of Tyr on the Siberian mainland in 1411. There is some evidence that Admiral Yishiha reached Sakhalin in 1413 during one of his expeditions to the lower Amur and granted Ming titles to a local chieftain.

The Ming recruited headmen from Sakhalin for administrative posts such as commander (指揮使; zhǐhuīshǐ), assistant commander (指揮僉事; zhǐhuī qiānshì), and "official charged with subjugation" (衛鎮撫; wèizhènfǔ). In 1431, one such assistant commander, Alige, brought marten pelts as tribute to the Wuliehe post. In 1437, four other assistant commanders (Zhaluha, Sanchiha, Tuolingha, and Alingge) also presented tribute. According to the Ming Veritable Records, these posts, like the position of headman, were hereditary and passed down the patrilineal line. During these tributary missions, the headmen would bring their sons, who later inherited their titles. In return for tribute, the Ming awarded them with silk uniforms.

Nivkh women in Sakhalin married Han Chinese officials when the Ming took tribute from Sakhalin and the Amur region. Due to Ming rule in Manchuria, Chinese cultural and religious influence such as Chinese New Year, "the Chinese god", and motifs such as dragons, spirals, and scrolls spread among the Ainu, Nivkh, and Amur natives such as the Udeghe, Ulchi, and Nanai. These groups also adopted material goods and practices such as agriculture, husbandry, heating technologies, iron cookpots, silk, and cotton.

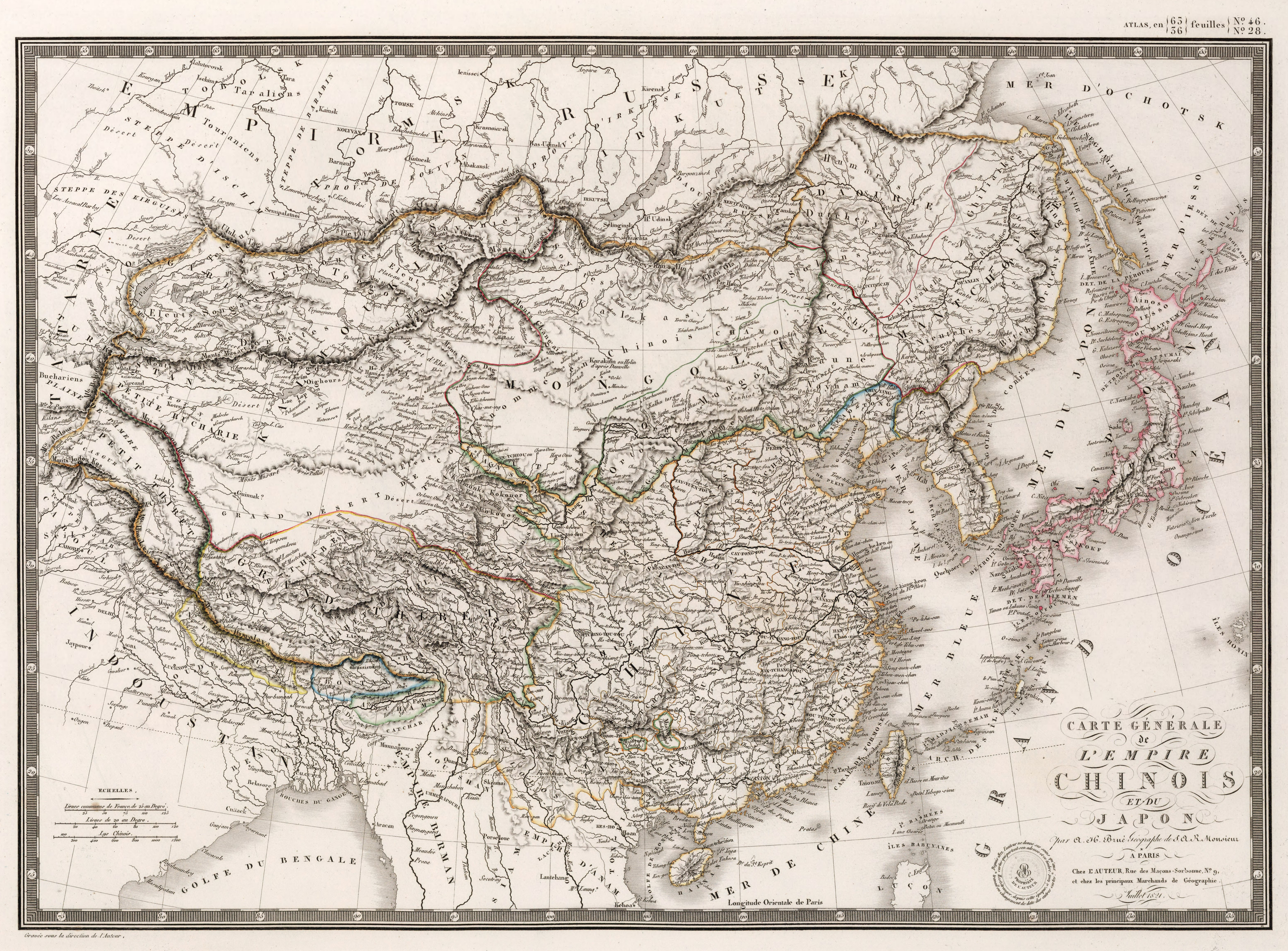
French map from 1821 shows Sakhalin as part of Qing Empire, and the Kuril Islands are a part of Japan

Qing China, which the Manchu people established in 1644, called Sakhalin "Kuyedao" (Chinese: 庫頁島; pinyin: Kùyè dǎo; lit. 'island of the Ainu') or "Kuye Fiyaka" (ᡴᡠᠶᡝ
ᡶᡳᠶᠠᡴᠠ). The Manchus called it Sagaliyan ula angga hada 'Island at the Mouth of the Black River'. The Qing first asserted influence over Sakhalin after the 1689 Treaty of Nerchinsk, which defined the Stanovoy Range as the border between the Qing and the Russian Empire. In the following year the Qing sent forces to the Amur estuary and demanded that the residents, including the Sakhalin Ainu, pay tribute. This was followed by several further visits to the island as part of the Qing effort to map the area. To enforce its influence, the Qing sent soldiers and mandarins across Sakhalin, reaching most parts of the island except the southern tip. The Qing imposed a fur-tribute system on the region's inhabitants.

The Qing dynasty ruled these regions by imposing upon them a fur tribute system, just as had the Yuan and Ming dynasties. Residents who were required to pay tributes had to register according to their hala (ᡥᠠᠯᠠ, the clan of the father's side) and gashan (ᡤᠠᡧᠠᠨ, village), and a designated chief of each unit was put in charge of district security as well as the annual collection and delivery of fur. By 1750, fifty-six hala and 2,398 households were registered as fur tribute payers, – those who paid with fur were rewarded mainly with Nishiki silk brocade, and every year the dynasty supplied the chief of each clan and village with official silk clothes (mangpao, duanpao), which were the gowns of the mandarin. Those who offered especially large fur tributes were granted the right to create a familial relationship with officials of the Manchu Eight Banners (at the time equivalent to Chinese aristocrats) by marrying an official's adopted daughter. Further, the tribute payers were allowed to engage in trade with officials and merchants at the tribute location. By these policies, the Qing dynasty brought political stability to the region and established the basis for commerce and economic development.

— Shiro Sasaki

The Qing dynasty established an office in Ningguta, situated midway along the Mudan River, to handle fur from the lower Amur and Sakhalin. Tribute was supposed to be brought to regional offices, but the lower Amur and Sakhalin were considered too remote, so the Qing sent officials directly to these regions every year to collect tribute and to present awards. By the 1730s, the Qing had appointed senior figures among the indigenous communities as "clan chief" (hala-i-da) or "village chief" (gasan-da or mokun-da). In 1732, 6 hala, 18 gasban, and 148 households were registered as tribute bearers in Sakhalin. Manchu officials gave tribute missions rice, salt, other necessities, and gifts during the duration of their mission. Tribute missions occurred during the summer months. During the reign of the Qianlong Emperor (r. 1735–1795), a trade post existed at Deren, upstream of Kiji (Kizi) Lake, according to Rinzo Mamiya. There were 500–600 people at the market during Mamiya's stay there.

Local native Sakhalin chiefs had their daughters taken as wives by Manchu officials as sanctioned by the Qing dynasty when the Qing exercised jurisdiction in Sakhalin and took tribute from them.

=== Japanese colonization ===
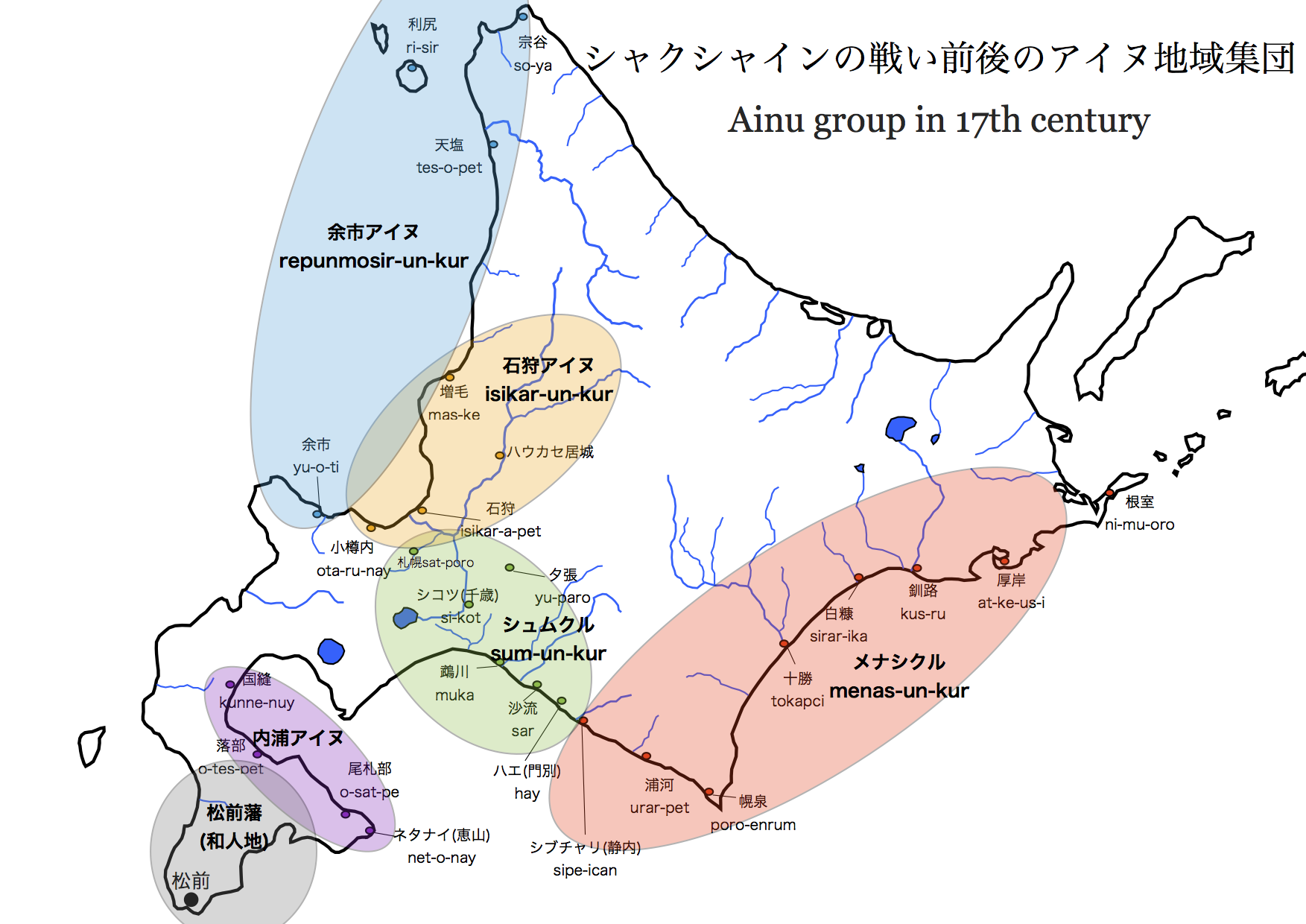
Ainu groups around the time of Shakushain's revolt (1669–1672)

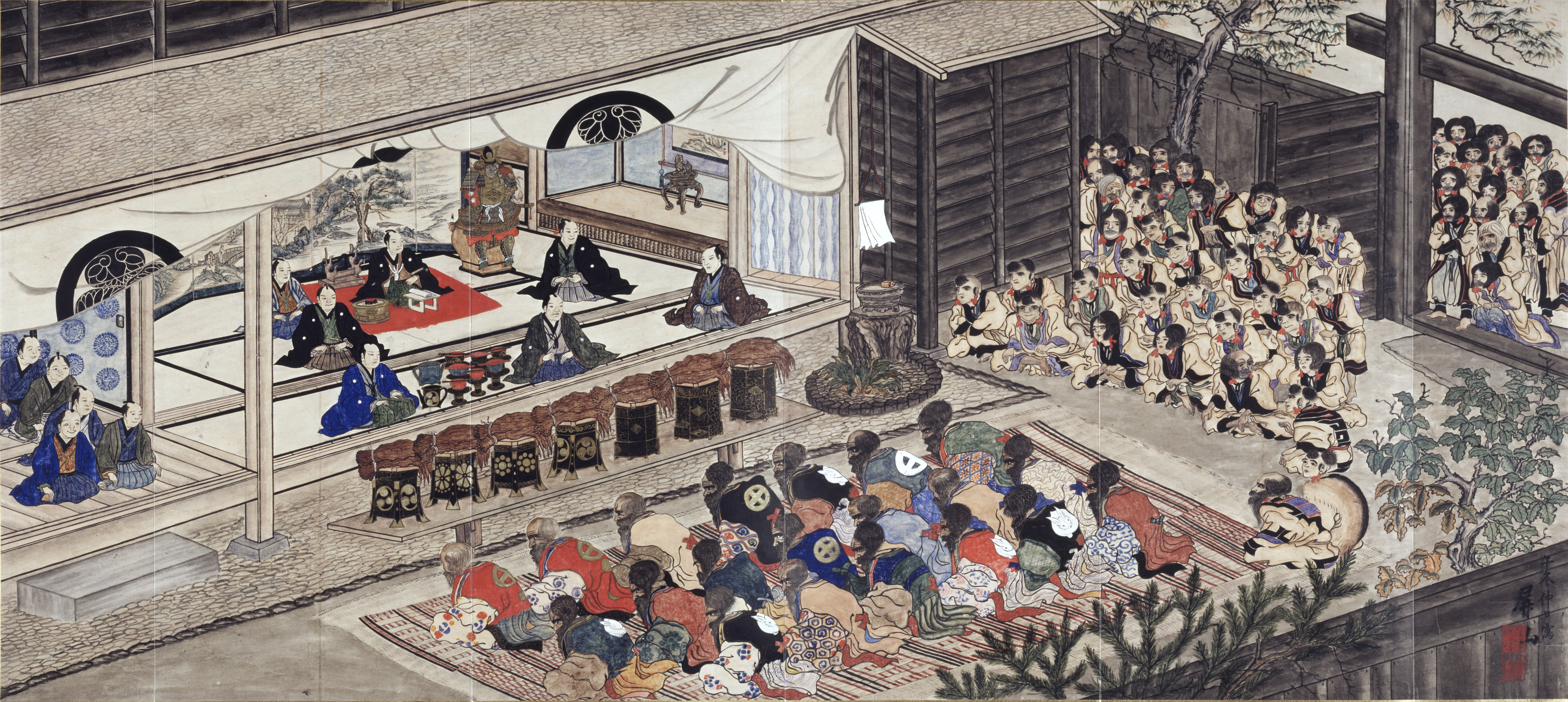
Omusha ceremony involving the Hidaka Ainu, by Hirasawa Byōzan c. 19th century

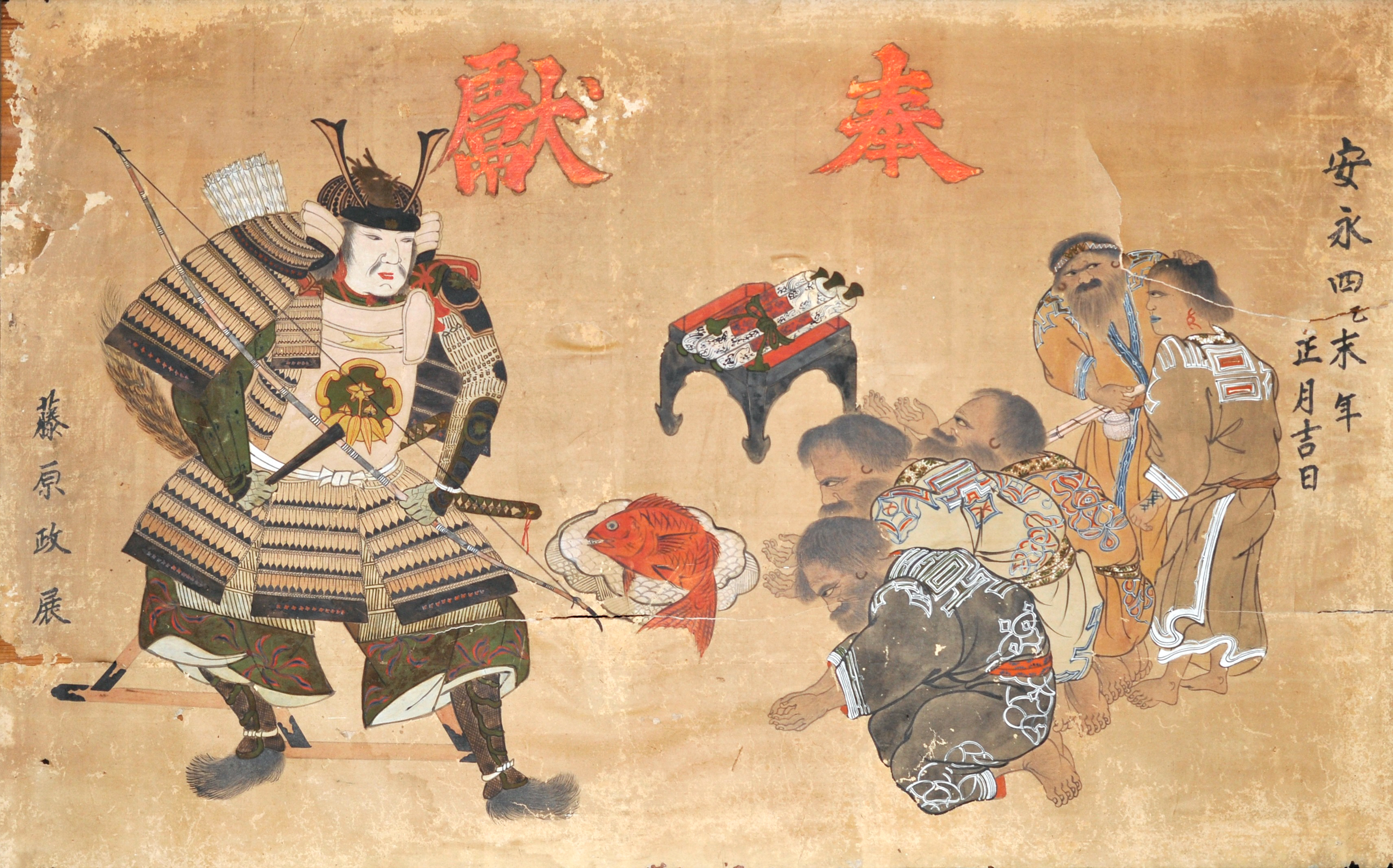
A Japanese samurai with a group of Ainu, c. 1775

In 1635, Matsumae Kinhiro, the second daimyō of Matsumae Domain in Hokkaidō, sent Satō Kamoemon and Kakizaki Kuroudo on an expedition to Sakhalin. One of the Matsumae explorers, Kodō Shōzaemon, stayed in the island in the winter of 1636 and sailed along the east coast to Taraika (now Poronaysk) in the spring of 1637. The Tokugawa bakufu (feudal government) granted the Matsumae clan exclusive rights to trade with the Ainu in the northern part of the island. Later, the Matsumae began to lease out trading rights to Japanese merchants, and contact between Japanese and Ainu became more extensive. Throughout this period, Ainu groups competed with each other to import goods from the Japanese, and epidemic diseases such as smallpox reduced the population. In an early colonization attempt, a Japanese settlement was established at Ōtomari on Sakhalin's southern end in 1679.

In the 1780s, the influence of the Japanese Tokugawa Shogunate on the Ainu of southern Sakhalin increased significantly. By the beginning of the 19th century, the Japanese economic zone extended midway up the east coast, to Taraika. With the exception of the Nayoro Ainu located on the west coast in close proximity to China, most Ainu stopped paying tribute to the Qing dynasty. The Matsumae clan was nominally in charge of Sakhalin, but they neither protected nor governed the Ainu there. Instead they extorted the Ainu for Chinese silk, which they sold in Honshu as Matsumae's special product. To obtain Chinese silk, the Ainu fell into debt, owing much fur to the Santan, who lived near the Qing office. The Ainu also sold the silk uniforms (mangpao, bufu, and chaofu) given to them by the Qing, which made up the majority of what the Japanese knew as nishiki and jittoku. As dynastic uniforms, the silk was of considerably higher quality than that traded at Nagasaki, and enhanced Matsumae prestige as exotic items. Eventually the Tokugawa government, realizing that they could not depend on the Matsumae, took control of Sakhalin in 1807.

Mogami's interest in the Sakhalin trade intensified when he learned that Yaenkoroaino, the above-mentioned elder from Nayoro, possessed a memorandum written in Manchurian, which stated that the Ainu elder was an official of the Qing state. Later surveys on Sakhalin by shogunal officials such as Takahashi Jidayú and Nakamura Koichiró only confirmed earlier observations: Sakhalin and Sóya Ainu traded foreign goods at trading posts, and because of the pressure to meet quotas, they fell into debt. These goods, the officials confirmed, originated at Qing posts, where continental traders acquired them during tributary ceremonies. The information contained in these types of reports turned out to be a serious blow to the future of Matsumae's trade monopoly in Ezo.

— Brett L. Walker

During this period the Ainu acted as crucial parties to Russian-Japanese relations, where they participated as guides in expeditions, provided information about Japan and Russia to each other, acted as translators between Russian and Japanese individuals, and provided intermediary trade services. The importance of the Ainu in facilitating contact between Russians and Japanese is recorded in Russian images depicting official meetings at the time, where the Ainu were included alongside Russian and Japanese figures. From 1778 to 1779 a Russian delegation met with Japanese individuals at trading posts in northern Hokkaido. Japanese and Russian records of the meeting detailed how, despite two Russian individuals being able to speak Japanese, the discussions were conducted in Ainu. Where a Japanese individual would speak in broken Ainu, then an Ainu individual from Hokkaido would correct it, and Ainu guides who had come from the Kuril islands with the Russians would translate it from Ainu to Russian.

From 1799 to 1806, the Tokugawa shogunate took direct control of southern Hokkaido. Japan proclaimed sovereignty over Sakhalin in 1807, and in 1809 Mamiya Rinzō claimed that it was an island. During this period, Ainu women were separated from their husbands and either subjected to rape or forcibly married to Japanese men. Meanwhile, Ainu men were deported to merchant subcontractors for five- and ten-year terms of service. Policies of family separation and assimilation, combined with the impact of smallpox, caused the Ainu population to drop significantly in the early 19th century. In the 18th century, there were 80,000 Ainu, but by 1868, there were only about 15,000 Ainu in Hokkaido, 2,000 in Sakhalin, and around 100 in the Kuril Islands.

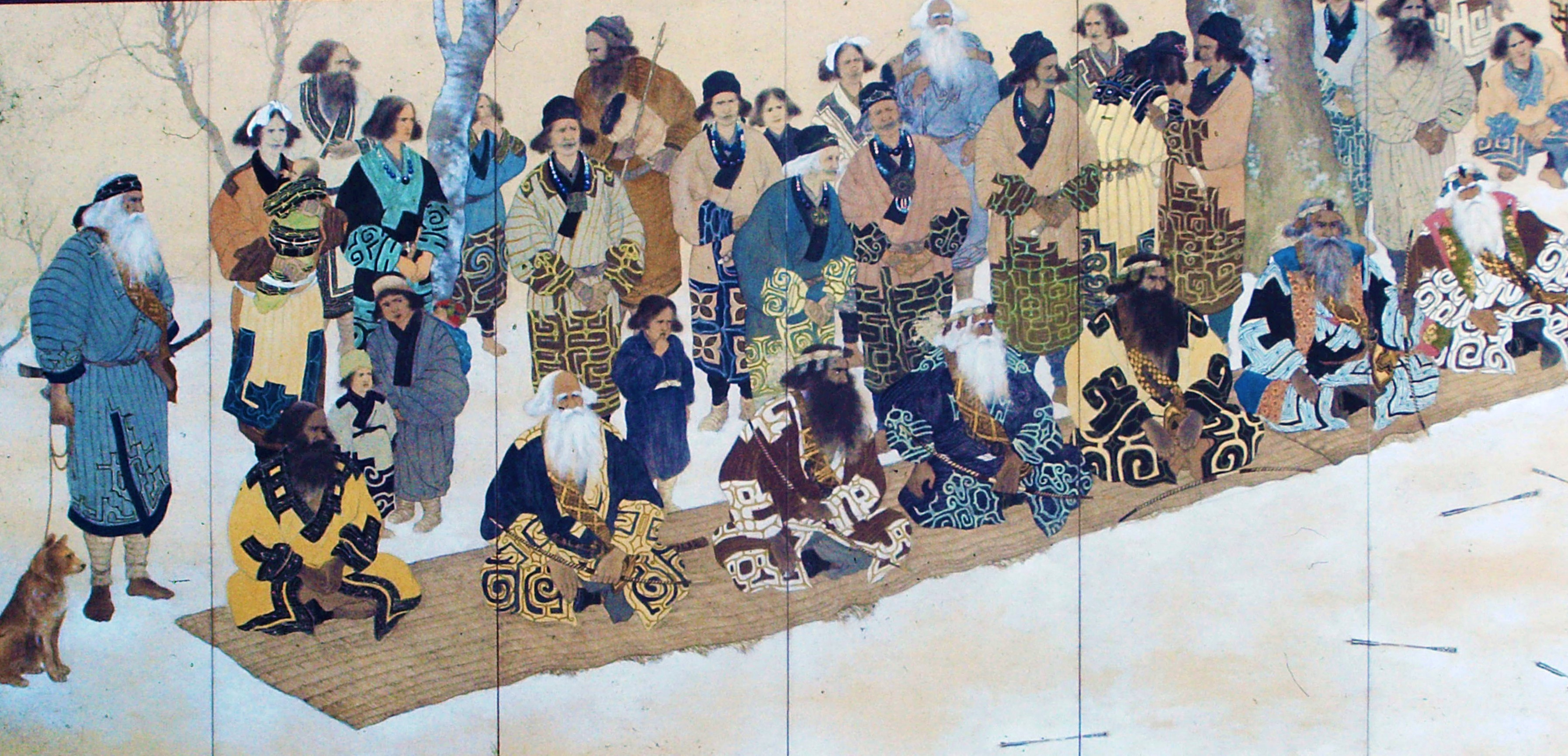
Ainu people, by Murase Yoshinori, 1918

Despite their growing influence in the area in the early 19th century as a result of these policies, the Tokugawa shogunate was unable to gain a monopoly on Ainu trade with those on the Asian mainland, even by the year 1853. Santan traders, a group composed mostly of the Ulchi, Nanai, and Oroch peoples of the Amur River, commonly interacted with the Ainu people independent of the Japanese government, especially in the northern part of Hokkaido. In addition to their trading ventures, Santan traders sometimes kidnapped or purchased Ainu women from Rishiri Island to become their wives. This further escalated Japan's presence in the area, as the Tokugawa shogunate believed a monopoly on the Santan trade would better protect the Ainu people.

=== Japanese annexation of Hokkaido ===
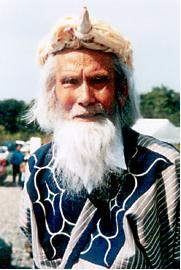
Tatsujiro Kuzuno, a prominent proponent of Ainu culture

In 1869, the imperial government established the Hokkaidō Development Commission as part of the Meiji Restoration. Researcher Katarina Sjöberg quotes Yūko Baba's 1980 account of the Japanese government's reasoning:

... The development of Japan's large northern island had several objectives: First, it was seen as a means to defend Japan from a rapidly developing and expansionist Russia. Second ... it offered a solution to the unemployment for the former samurai class ... Finally, development promised to yield the needed natural resources for a growing capitalist economy.

As a result of the 1875 Treaty of St. Petersburg, Japanese-administered Sakhalin was given to Russia, while the Kuril Islands—along with their Ainu inhabitants—came under Japanese administration. In 1899, the Japanese government passed an act labeling the Ainu as "former aborigines", with the idea that they would assimilate. This resulted in the Japanese government taking the land where the Ainu people lived and placing it under Japanese control. Also at this time, the Ainu were granted automatic Japanese citizenship, effectively denying them the status of an indigenous group.

The Ainu went from being a relatively isolated group of people to having their land, language, religion, and customs assimilated into those of the Japanese. Their land was distributed to the Yamato Japanese settlers to create and maintain farms in the model of Western industrial agriculture. It was known as "colonization" (拓殖) at the time, but later by the euphemism, "opening up undeveloped land" (開拓). Additionally, factories like flour mills and beer breweries, along with mining practices, resulted in the creation of infrastructure such as roads and railway lines during a development period that lasted until 1904. During this time, the Ainu were ordered to cease religious practices such as animal sacrifice and the custom of tattooing. The same act applied to the native Ainu on Sakhalin after its annexation as Karafuto Prefecture.

=== Assimilation after annexation ===
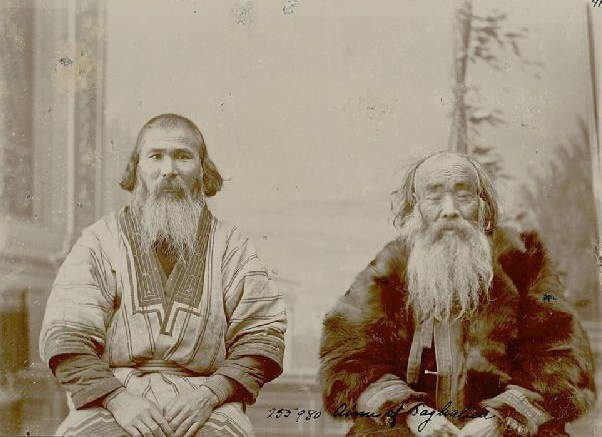
Sakhalin Ainu in 1904

The Ainu have historically suffered from economic and social discrimination, as both the Japanese government and mainstream population regarded them as dirty and primitive barbarians. The majority of Ainu were forced to be petty laborers during the Meiji Restoration, which saw the introduction of Hokkaido into the Japanese Empire and the privatization of traditional Ainu lands. During the 19th and 20th centuries, the Japanese government denied the rights of the Ainu to their traditional cultural practices, such as hunting, gathering, and speaking their native language.

The legal denial of Ainu cultural practices mostly stemmed from the 1899 Hokkaido Former Aborigines Protection Act. This law and its associated policies were designed to fully integrate the Ainu into Japanese society while erasing Ainu culture and identity. The Ainu's position as manual laborers and their forced integration into larger Japanese society have led to discriminatory practices by the Japanese government that can still be felt today.

Intermarriage between Japanese and Ainu was actively promoted by the Ainu to lessen the chances of discrimination against their offspring. As a result, many Ainu today are indistinguishable from their Japanese neighbors, but some Ainu-Japanese are interested in traditional Ainu culture. For example, Oki, born as the child of an Ainu father and a Japanese mother, became a musician who plays the traditional Ainu instrument, the tonkori. There are also many small towns in the southeastern or Hidaka region of Hokkaido where ethnic Ainu live, such as in Nibutani (Niputay).

From the early 1870s, Christian missionary work was conducted among the Ainu. The Anglican Communion missionaries included the Rt. Rev. Philip Fyson, Bishop of Hokkaido, and the Rev. John Batchelor. Batchelor wrote extensively in English about the beliefs and daily life of the Ainu in Yezo (or Ezo), and his publications are a source of photographs of the Japanese and Ainu close to the missions.

=== Russo-Japanese War ===
Ainu men were first recruited into the Japanese military in 1898. Sixty-three Ainu served in the Russo-Japanese War (1904–1905), eight of whom died in battle or from illness contracted during military service. 54 received military awards, with three receiving the Order of the Golden Kite, granted for bravery, leadership, or command in battle.

== Origins and genetics ==
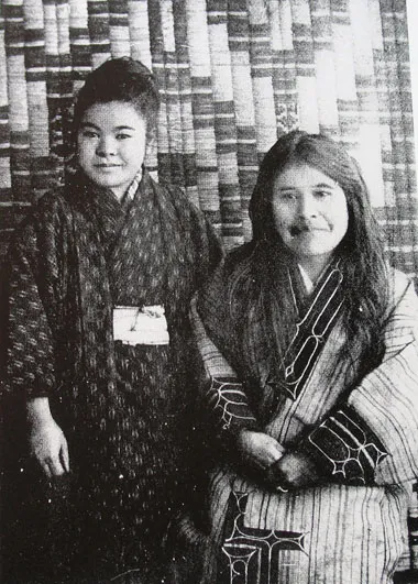
A picture of Imekanu, right, with her niece Yukie Chiri, a famous Ainu Japanese transcriber and translator of Ainu epic tales (1922)

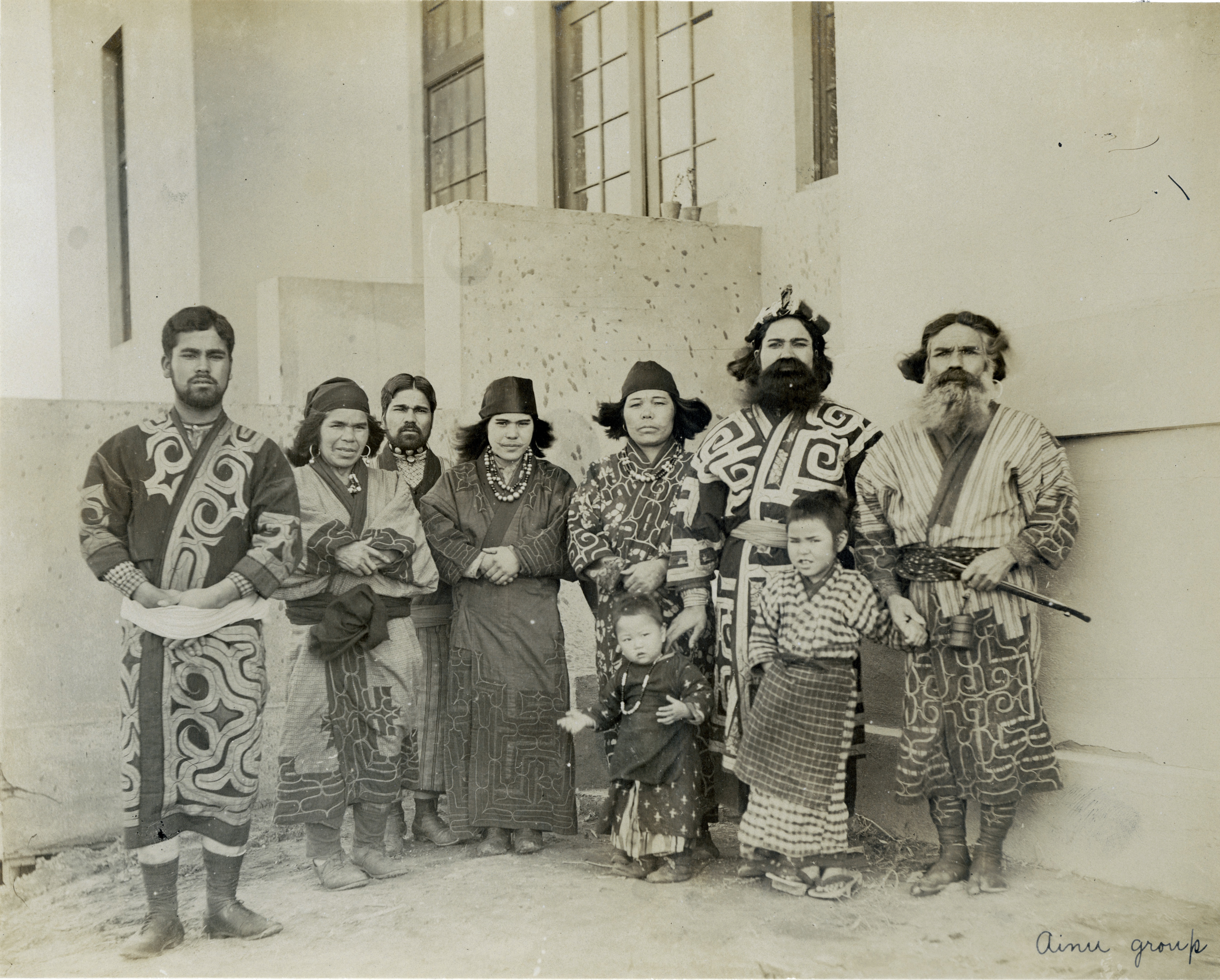
Ainu people of Hokkaido, exhibited at the 1904 Louisiana Purchase Exposition

The Ainu are regarded as having descended from the indigenous Japanese hunter-gatherers who lived in Japan during the Jōmon period (c. 14,000 to 300 BCE).

The exact origins of the early Ainu remain unclear, but it is the general consensus among historians that the Ainu are linked to the Satsumon culture of the Epi-Jōmon period, with later influences from the nearby Okhotsk culture. The emergence of the Ainu culture is thus primarily attributed to the Satsumon culture, which later received some contributions from the Okhotsk culture via cultural contacts in northern Hokkaido after the Satsumon culture expanded northwards and into Sakhalin. This view has been corroborated by later analyses.

The Ainu culture may be better described as an "Ainu cultural complex", taking into account the regional variable subgroups of Ainu peoples. While the Ainu can be considered a continuation of the indigenous Jomon culture, they also display links to surrounding cultures, pointing to a larger cultural complex flourishing around the Sea of Okhotsk. Some authors have also described the development of the Ainu culture as the "resistance" of a Jomon society to the emerging Japanese state.

Historically many Europeans tried to argue for an origin of the Ainu that related them to white Europeans, due to perceived similarities in facial structures, the increased presence of facial and body hair among the Ainu compared to Yamato Japanese, and a perceived paler complexion.

Japanese writers in the 18th century found physical similarity between the Ainu people and Russian, describing the Russians as being "red-haired Ainu" Russian writer Anton Chekhov described the Ainu as physically resembling the Roma(Gypsy), due to having dark skin, with bushy beards, moustaches and black hair and dark eyes. While Russians like sailor V. Rimsky-Korsakov had suggested that bearded Ainu in robes as looking very similar to European Russian peasants.

The book of Ainu Life and Legends by author Kyōsuke Kindaichi (published by the Japanese Tourist Board in 1942) contains a physical description of Ainu: "Many have wavy hair, but some straight black hair. Very few of them have wavy brownish hair. Their skins are generally reported to be light brown. But this is due to the fact that they labor on the sea and in briny winds all day. Old people who have long desisted from their outdoor work are often found to be as white as western men. "

=== Relationship with the historical Emishi ===
While the view that the ancient Emishi were identical to the Ainu has been largely disproven by current research, the exact relationship between them is still under dispute. It is agreed that at least some Emishi spoke Ainu languages and were ethnically related to the Ainu. The Emishi may, however, have also included non-Ainu groups, which can either be associated with groups distantly related to the Ainu (Ainu-like groups) but forming their own ethnicity, or early Japonic-speakers outside the influence of the Yamato court. The Emishi display clear material culture links to the Ainu of Hokkaido. Based on Ainu-like toponyms throughout Tohoku, it is argued that the Emishi, like the Ainu, descended from the Epi-Jōmon tribes and initially spoke Ainu-related languages.

The term "Emishi" in the Nara period (710–794) referred to people who lived in the Tohoku region and whose lifestyle and culture differed markedly from that of the Yamato people; it was originally a highly cultural and political concept with no racial distinction.

=== Genetic relations ===
Genetic research has shown the Ainu to be closely related to other Northern and East Asian populations. The Ainu are also closely related to the deeply diverged East Asian lineage of the Jōmon peoples of Japan. This lineage arose after the divergence between Tianyuan and Hoabinhian lineages but diverged from Ancient East Asians before they split into Ancient Northern East Asians and Ancient Southern East Asians.

== Culture ==
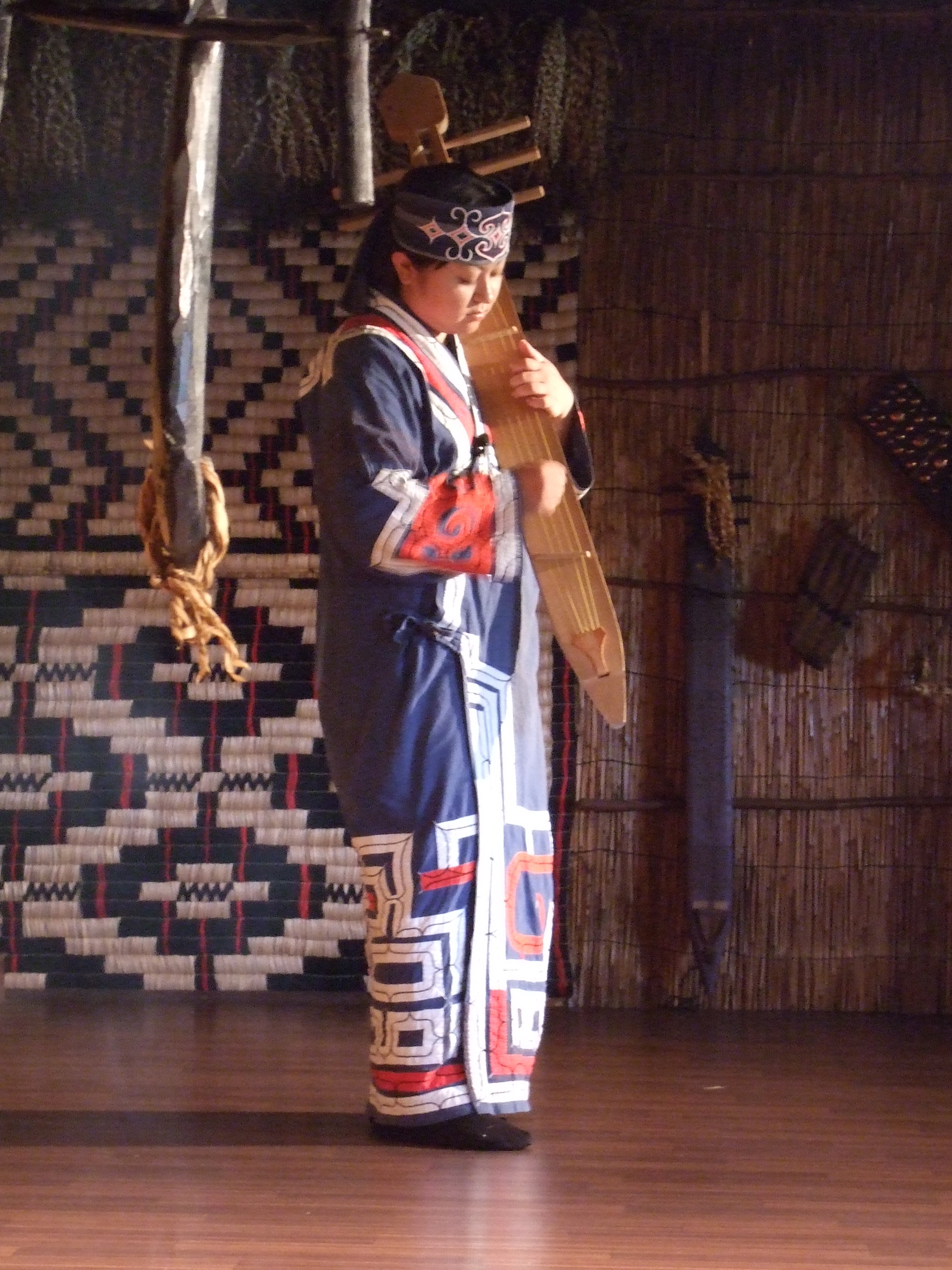
Woman playing a tonkori

Traditional Ainu culture is quite different from Japanese culture. According to Tanaka Sakurako from the University of British Columbia, the Ainu culture can be included into a wider "northern circumpacific region", referring to various indigenous cultures of Northeast Asia and "beyond the Bering Strait" in North America. The Ainu culture developed from the 13th century (late Kamakura period) to the present day. While most Ainu in Japan now live outwardly similar lives to the Wajin (ethnic Japanese) due to assimilation policies, many still maintain their Ainu identity and respect for traditional Ainu ways, known as "Ainu puri". The distinctive Ainu patterns (Ainu mon'yō) and oral literature (Yukar) have been designated as Hokkaido Heritage.

=== Language ===
Map of the pre-1945 distribution of Ainu languages and dialects

In 2008, the news block World Watch gave an estimate of fewer than 100 remaining speakers of the Ainu language. In 1993, linguist Alexander Vovin placed the number at fewer than 15 speakers, characterizing the language as "almost extinct". Because so few present-day speakers are left, study of the Ainu language is limited and is based largely on historical research. Historically, the status of the Ainu language was rather high and was used by early Russian and Japanese administrative officials to communicate with each other and with the Ainu people.

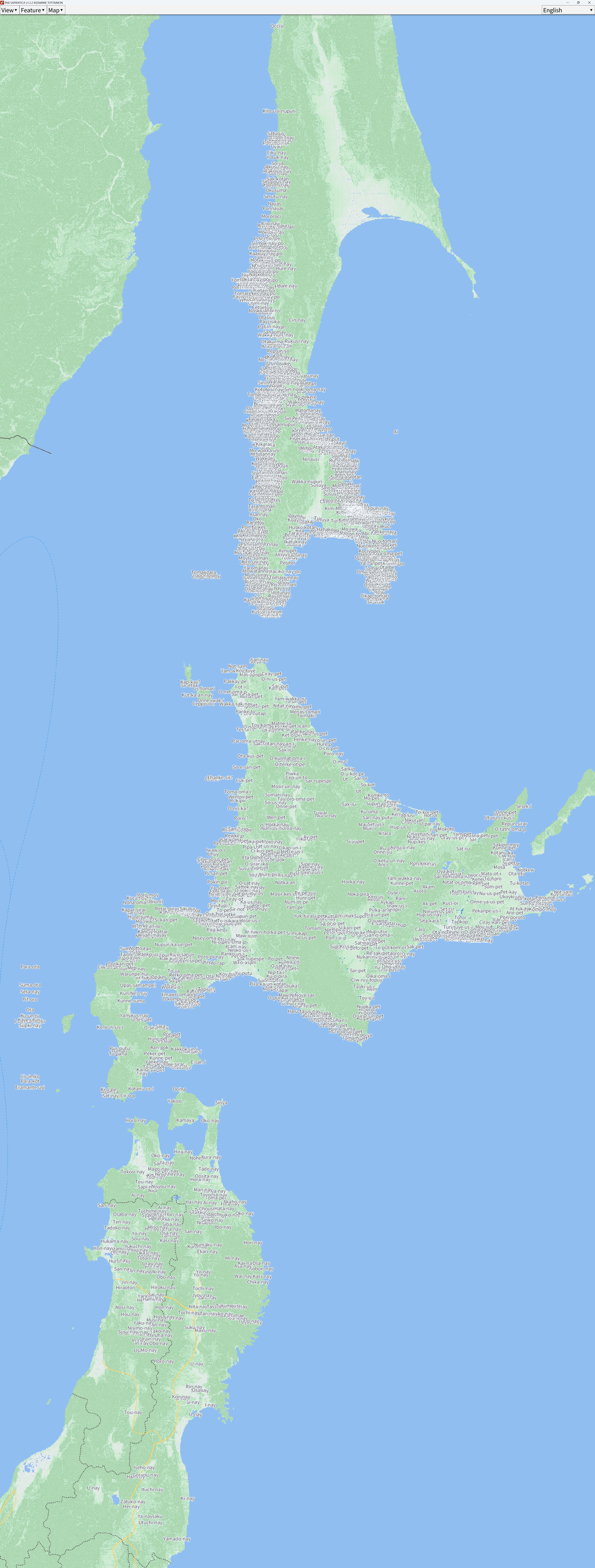
Place names in the Ainu language

Despite the small number of native speakers of Ainu, there is an active movement to revitalize the language, mainly in Hokkaido but also elsewhere, such as in Kanto. Ainu oral literature has been documented both in hopes of safeguarding it for future generations and for use as a teaching tool for language learners. As of 2011, there were an increasing number of second-language learners, especially in Hokkaido.

The resurgence of Ainu culture and language is in large part due to the pioneering efforts of the late Ainu folklorist, activist, and former Diet member Shigeru Kayano, himself a native speaker. He first opened an Ainu language school in 1987, funded by Ainu Kyokai.

Although some researchers have attempted to show that the Ainu and Japanese languages are related, modern scholars have rejected the idea that the relationship goes beyond contact, such as the mutual borrowing of words. No attempt to show a relationship with Ainu to any other language has gained wide acceptance, and linguists currently classify Ainu as a language isolate. Most Ainu people speak either Japanese or Russian.

The Ainu language has no indigenous system of writing and has historically been transliterated using Japanese kana or Russian Cyrillic. As of 2019, it was typically written either in katakana or in the Latin alphabet.

Many of the Ainu dialects, especially those from different extremities of Hokkaido, are not mutually intelligible. However, all Ainu speakers understand the classic Ainu language of the Yukar, a form of Ainu epic. Without a writing system, the Ainu were masters of narration, with the Yukar and other forms of narration such as Uepeker (Uwepeker) tales being committed to memory and related at gatherings that often lasted many hours or even days. Concepts expressed with prepositions in English, such as 'to', 'from', 'by', 'in', and 'at', appear as postpositional forms in Ainu. Whereas prepositions come before the word they modify, postpositions come after it. A single sentence in Ainu can comprise many added or agglutinated sounds or affixes that represent nouns or ideas.

=== Social structure ===
Ainu society was traditionally organized into small villages called kotan, typically located in river basins or along seashores where food was readily available, particularly in rivers where salmon traveled upstream. The amount of households that made up a kotan varied, usually comprising less than ten. The Ainu who lived in a kotan named it accordingly from the river near it. The families that made up the kotan were not all grouped together, but scattered in a general area that made up the kotan. In early modern times, Ainu were forced to relocate their kotan near Japanese fishing grounds to provide labor. As a result, traditional kotan disappeared, and large villages of several dozen families were formed around fishing grounds. While not always common, sometimes multiple kotan came together to form a "local group". There were two types of local groups: mono-settlement and multi-settlement. Local groups were able to sustain themselves. Because of this, the Ainu had no need to form larger groups than local groups. Leading the local group was the headman, who managed various external and domestic affairs. In the Ainu social structure an indefinite number of community members sat in judgment upon criminals. Capital punishment did not exist, nor did the community resort to imprisonment. Beating was considered a sufficient and final penalty. However, in the case of murder, the nose and ears of the culprit were cut off, or the tendons of their feet were severed.

=== Appearance and dress ===
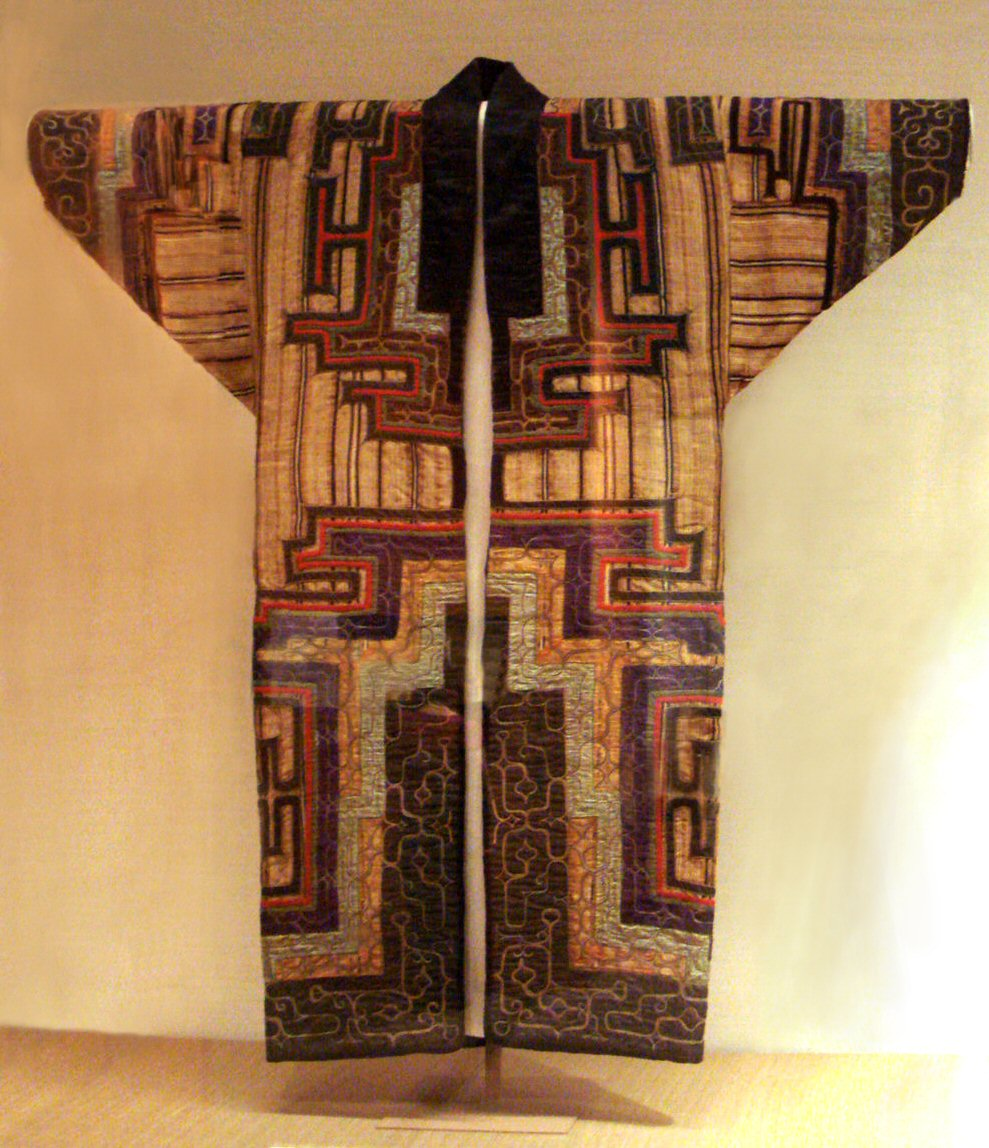
Ainu ceremonial dress, British Museum

Never shaving after a certain age, the men have full beards and moustaches. Men and women alike cut their hair level with the shoulders at the sides of the head, trimmed semi-circularly behind. The women tattoo (anchi-piri) their mouths and sometimes their forearms. Ainu people are often tattooed on their faces, and more specifically their cheeks, foreheads, lips, and eyebrows, as well as on the backs of their hands and arms. Women would usually begin their tattoos between 10–13 years old, although in some cases they would start as early as 5 years old. These tattoos would progressively become greater in size through their lives until they reached the age where they were ready to marry. The soot deposited on a pot hung over a fire of birch bark is used for color. Traditional Ainu dress consists of a robe made from woven bark fibers (attusi or attush). The various styles consist generally of a simple short robe with straight sleeves, folded around the body, and tied with a band around the waist. The sleeves end at the wrist or forearm, and the length generally is to the calves. Women also wear an undergarment of Japanese cloth. In winter, the skins of animals are worn, with leggings of deerskin and, in Sakhalin, boots made from the skin of dogs or salmon. Ainu culture regards earrings, traditionally made from grapevines, as gender-neutral. Women also wear a beaded necklace called a tamasay. Modern craftswomen weave and embroider traditional garments that command very high prices.

=== Dwellings and structures ===
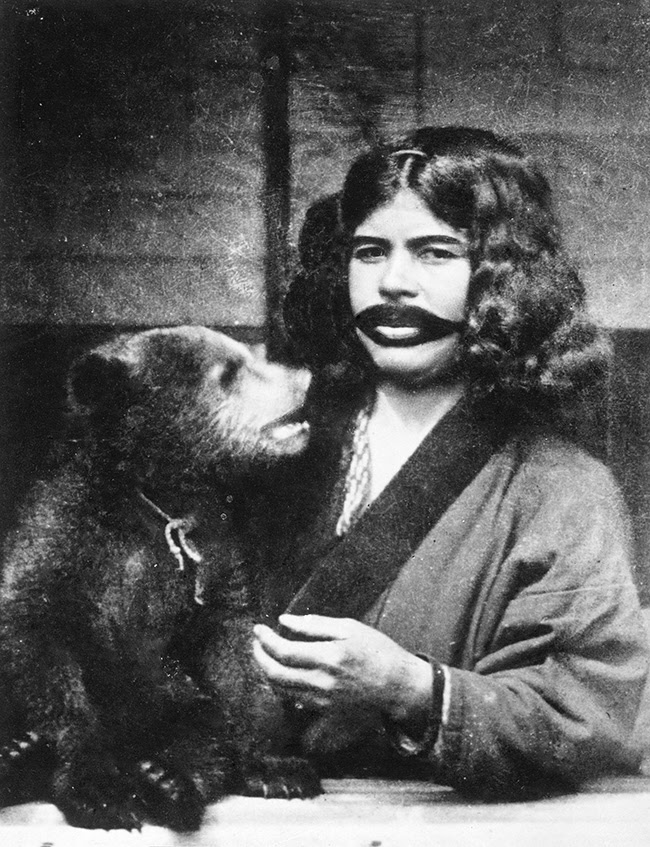
Ainu woman with mouth tattoos and a live bear

Their traditional habitations are reed-thatched huts, the largest about 20 ft (6 m) square, without partitions and having a fireplace in the center. There is no chimney; there is only a hole at the angle of the roof. One window sits on the eastern side, along with two doors. The house of the village head is used as a public meeting-place when one is needed. Another kind of traditional Ainu house is called chise. The "chise" or dwelling was an above-ground structure built with a wooden frame and roofed or walled with reeds, grasses, bark, or bamboo grass according to local conditions. A hearth stood near the center. Storehouses known as pu, outdoor facilities, drying racks, and, in some communities, enclosures for bear cubs were built around the house. They were typically oriented east to west or parallel to a river, with the entrance on the west side also serving as a storeroom. It has three windows, including the sacred rorun-puyar on the east side, through which gods enter and leave and ceremonial tools are taken in and out. The Ainu regard this window as sacred and are told never to look in through it. The chise has a platform for valuables called iyoykir behind the shiso. The Ainu place sintoko (hokai) and ikayop (quivers) there.

Additionally there is the chashi or hilltop fortification, these were constructed on hills, promontories, and river terraces. Their functions varied and may have included defense, ritual, control of routes, trade, and surveillance. The "okuriba" or sacred site, was a sacred ritual platform used in Ainu funerary customs. It was used to help send off the spirits of the deceased. The Okuriba was typically a raised platform where offerings were placed. The Ainu people believed that these offerings helped the deceased transition to the Spirit World.

=== Cuisine ===
Traditional Ainu cuisine consists of the meat of bears, foxes, wolves, badgers, oxen, and horses, as well as fish, fowl, millet, vegetables, herbs, and roots. The Ainu traditionally never eat raw fish or meat, always boiling or roasting it. They also cultivated crops such as millet (piyapa), foxtail millet (munchiro), and barnyard millet (menkur), which were used to make a type of sake called "tonoto" for ceremonial purposes. Salmon was particularly important, referred to as kamuy chep (god's fish) or shipe (true food). In autumn, large quantities of salmon were caught and processed into dried fish for preservation. This served not only as a staple food but also as a major trade item with the Japanese. The Ainu also made extensive use of the bulbs of the Cardiocrinum cordatum (turep), from which they extracted and preserved starch. This tradition of starch usage made it easy for them to adopt potatoes when they were introduced. Ainu cuisine is not commonly eaten outside Ainu communities. Only a few restaurants in Japan – mainly in Tokyo and Hokkaido – serve traditional Ainu dishes.

=== Hunting ===
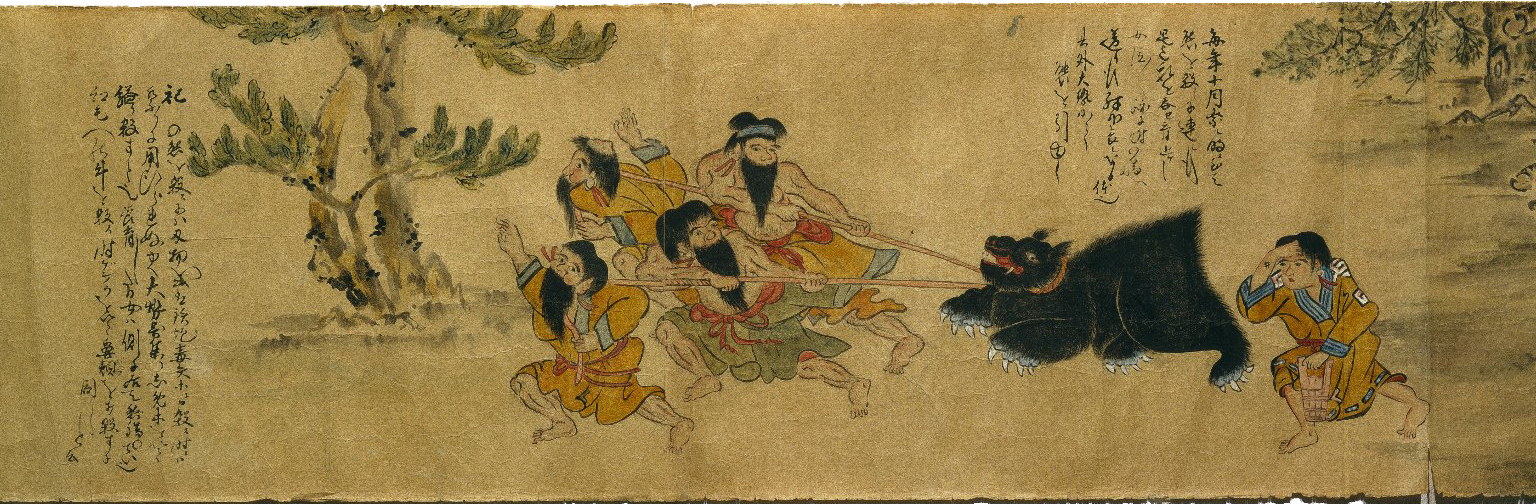
Bear hunting, 19th century

The Ainu traditionally hunt from late autumn to early summer, in part because in late autumn, plant gathering, salmon fishing, and other activities of securing food come to an end, and hunters readily find game in fields and mountains in which plants have withered. A village typically possesses a hunting-ground of its own, or several villages use a joint hunting territory, called an iwor. Heavy penalties were imposed on any outsiders trespassing on such hunting grounds or on joint hunting territory. The Ainu traditionally hunt Ussuri brown bears, Asian black bears, Ezo deer (a subspecies of sika deer), hares, red foxes, Japanese raccoon dogs, and other animals. Ezo deer are a particularly important food resource for the Ainu, as are salmon. The Ainu also hunt sea eagles, such as white-tailed sea eagles, along with ravens and other birds. The Ainu hunted eagles for their tail feathers, which they used in trade with the Japanese. Historically, the Ainu hunted sea-otters and traded their pelts in the Japanese market.

The Ainu hunted with arrows and spears with poison-coated points. They obtained the poison, called surku, from the roots and stalks of aconites. The recipe for this poison was a household secret that differed from family to family. They enhanced the poison with mixtures of roots and stalks of dog's bane, boiled juice of Mekuragumo (a type of harvestman), Matsumomushi (Notonecta triguttata, a species of backswimmer), tobacco, and other ingredients. They also used stingray stingers or skin-covering stingers. They traditionally hunt in groups with dogs. Before hunting, particularly for bears and similar animals, they may pray to the Kamuy-huci, the house guardian goddess, to convey their wishes for a large catch and to the god of mountains for safe hunting. The Ainu traditionally hunt bears during the spring thaw. At that time, bears are weak because they haven't eaten during their long hibernation. Ainu hunters catch hibernating bears or bears that have just left hibernation dens. When they hunt bears in summer, they use a spring trap loaded with an arrow, called an amappo. The Ainu usually use arrows to hunt deer. Also, they drive deer into a river or sea and shoot them with arrows. For a large catch, a whole village would drive a herd of deer off a cliff and club them to death.

==== Fishing ====
Fishing is important to Ainu culture. They largely catch trout in summer and salmon in autumn, as well as ito (Sakhalin taimen), big-scaled redfin, and other fish. Spears called marek were often used. Other methods were tesh fishing, uray fishing, and rawomap fishing. Many villages were built near rivers or along the coast. Each village or individual had a definite river fishing territory. Outsiders could not fish there freely and had to ask the owner.

=== Japanese lacquerware ===
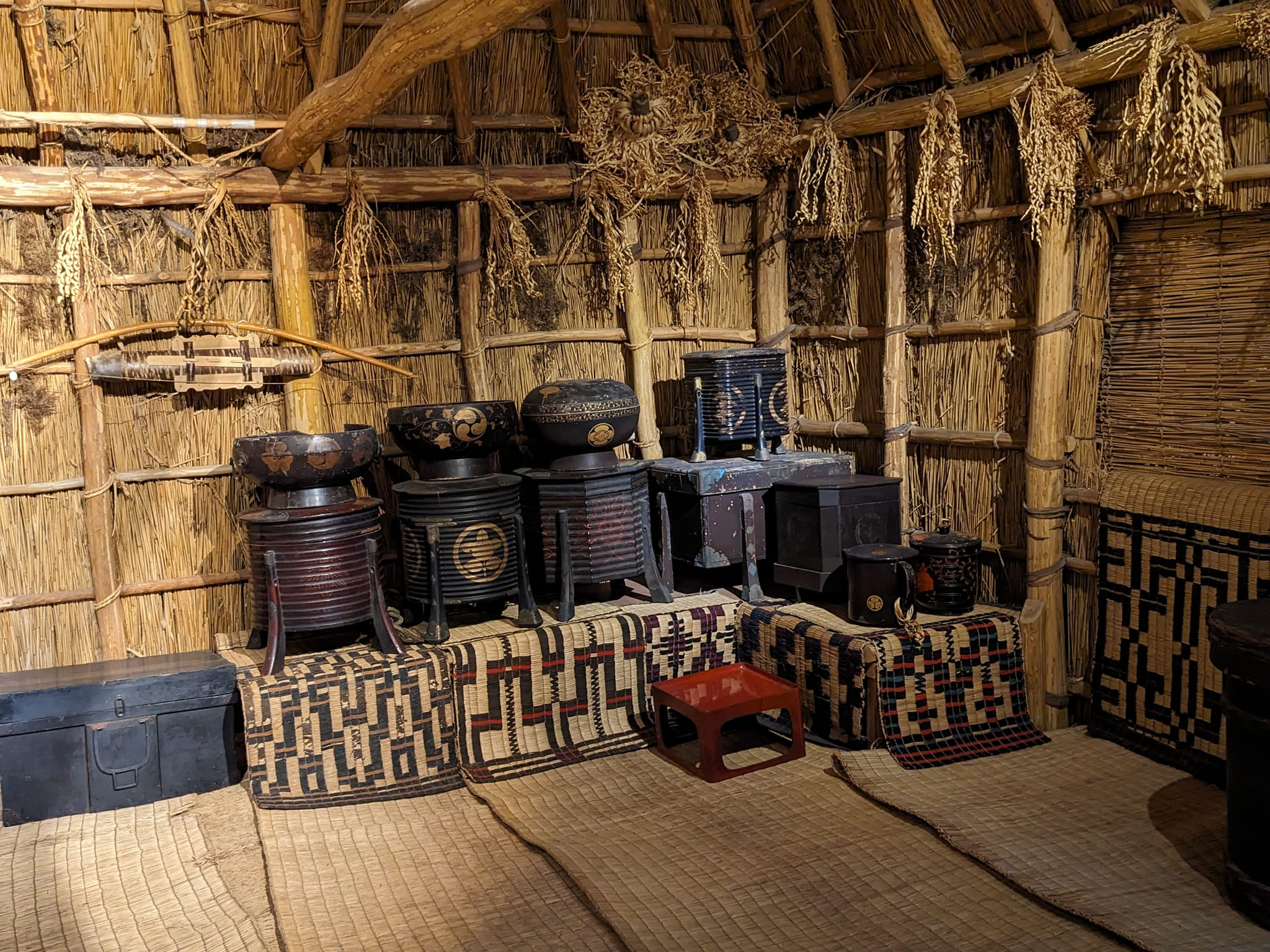
Lacquer stored in cise (Hokkaido Museum)

Japanese lacquerware was used in everyday life as tableware and often used in ceremonies (ritual utensils), such as the cups used to offer alcohol when praying to the kamui. Lacquerware was often treated as treasure, and it was also used as containers for storing other treasures.

One of the characteristics of Ainu lacquerware is that it is almost entirely imported from the south of Honshu. Some pieces may have been lacquered in Matsumae in southern Hokkaido, but since the technique of lacquering is from Honshu, lacquerware can be considered an introduced item among Ainu folk implements.

There are examples of spatulas and other objects used by the Ainu people for ceremonial purposes that remain in clusters of the same size, and some are specifically produced for trading with the Ainu.

=== Ornaments ===
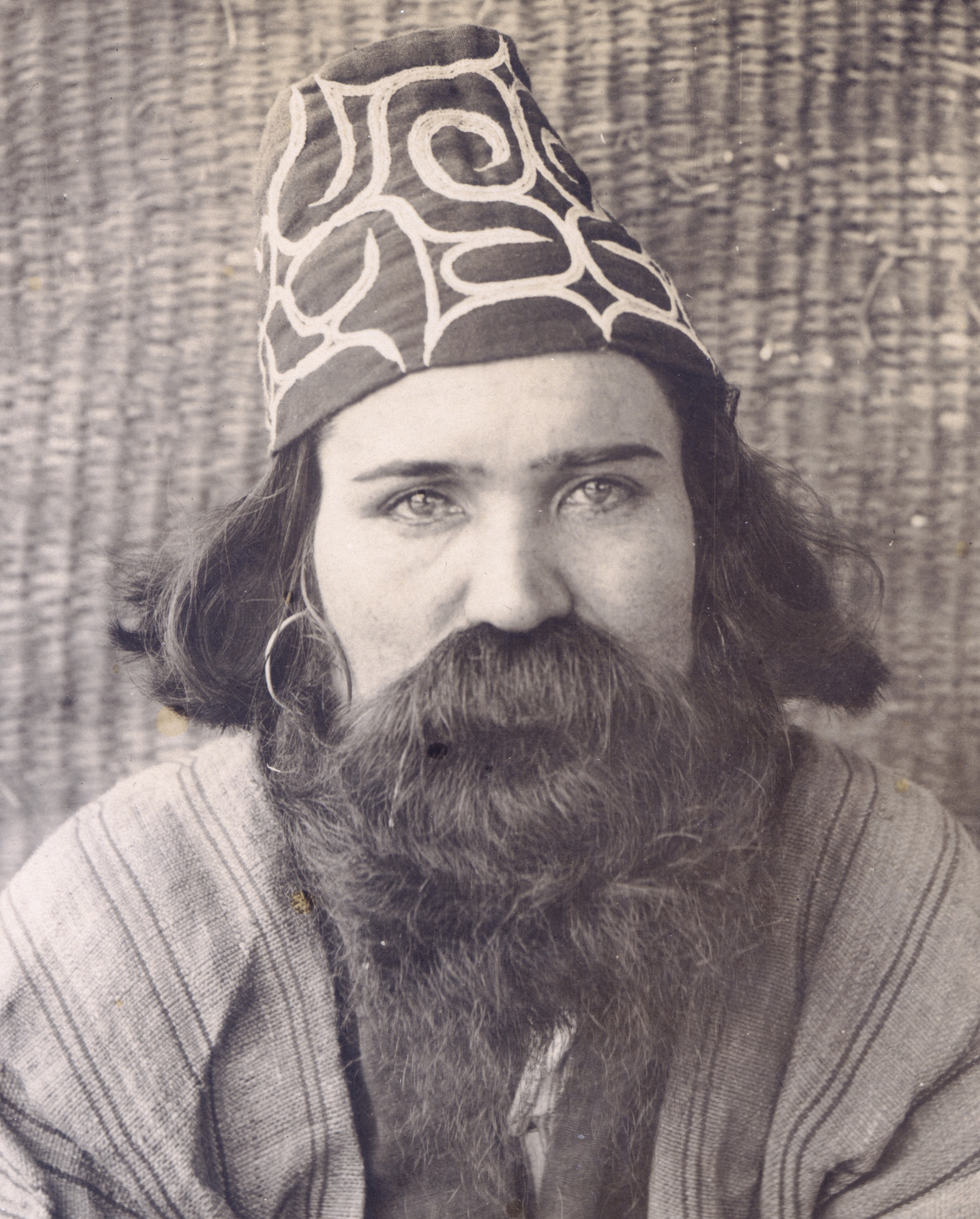
Ainu leader wearing a matanpushi in 1904

Traditionally, Ainu men wear a crown called a sapanpe for important ceremonies. Sapanpe are made from wood fiber with bundles of partially shaved wood. The crown has wooden figures of animal gods and other ornaments in its center. Men carry an emush (ceremonial sword) secured by an emush-at strap to their shoulders.

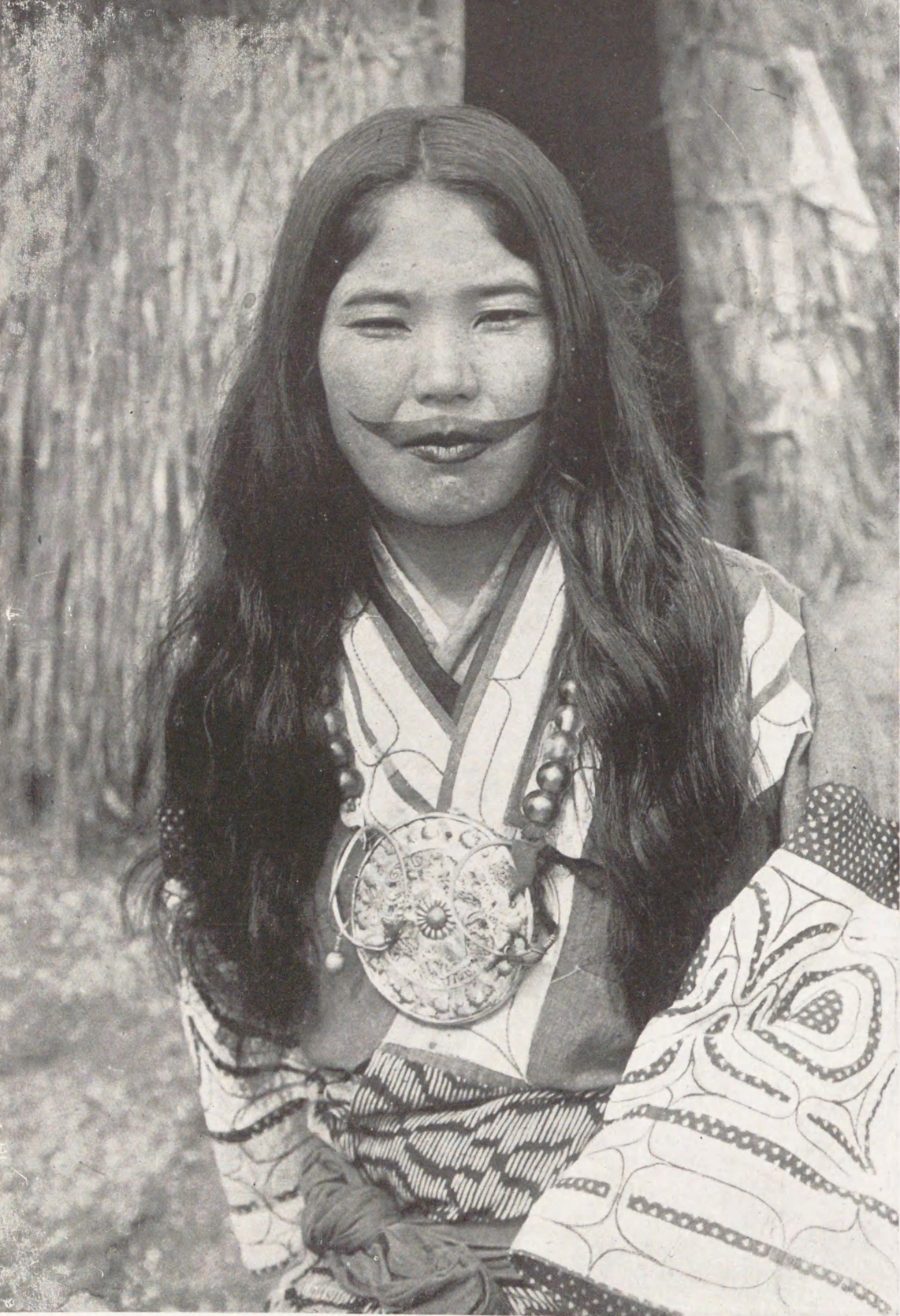
An Ainu woman from Hokkaido, c. 1930

Ainu women traditionally wear matanpushi, embroidered headbands, and ninkari, metal earrings with balls. Matanpushi and ninkari were originally also worn by men. Furthermore, aprons called maidari are now part of women's formal clothes. However, some old documents state that men wore maidari. Women sometimes wear a bracelet called a tekunkani.

Women may wear a necklace called a rektunpe, a long, narrow strip of cloth with metal plaques. They may also wear a necklace that reaches the breast, called a tamasay or shitoki, usually made from glass balls. Some glass balls came from trade with the Asian continent. The Ainu also obtained glass balls secretly made by the Matsumae clan.

=== Housing ===
A village is called a kotan in the Ainu language. Kotan were traditionally located in river basins and along seashores where food was readily available, particularly in the basins of rivers through which salmon traveled upstream. In early modern times, the Ainu people were forced to labor at Japanese fishing grounds. Ainu kotan were also forced to relocate to near fishing grounds so that the Japanese could secure a labor force. When the Japanese moved to other fishing grounds, Ainu kotan were forced to accompany them. As a result, the traditional kotan disappeared, and large villages of several dozen families were formed around the fishing grounds.

Cise or cisey (houses) in a kotan are made of cogon grass, bamboo grass, bark, etc. The length lays east to west or parallel to a river. A cise is about seven by five meters, with an entrance at the west end that also serves as a storeroom. A cise has three windows, including the rorun-puyar, a window located on the side facing the entrance (i.e., on the east side), through which gods enter and leave and ceremonial tools are taken in and out. The Ainu regard this window as sacred and are told never to look in through it. A cise has a fireplace near the entrance. A husband and wife would traditionally sit on the fireplace's left side (called shiso). Children and guests would sit facing them on the fireplace's right side (called harkiso). The cise has a platform for valuables called iyoykir behind the shiso. The Ainu place sintoko (hokai) and ikayop (quivers) there.

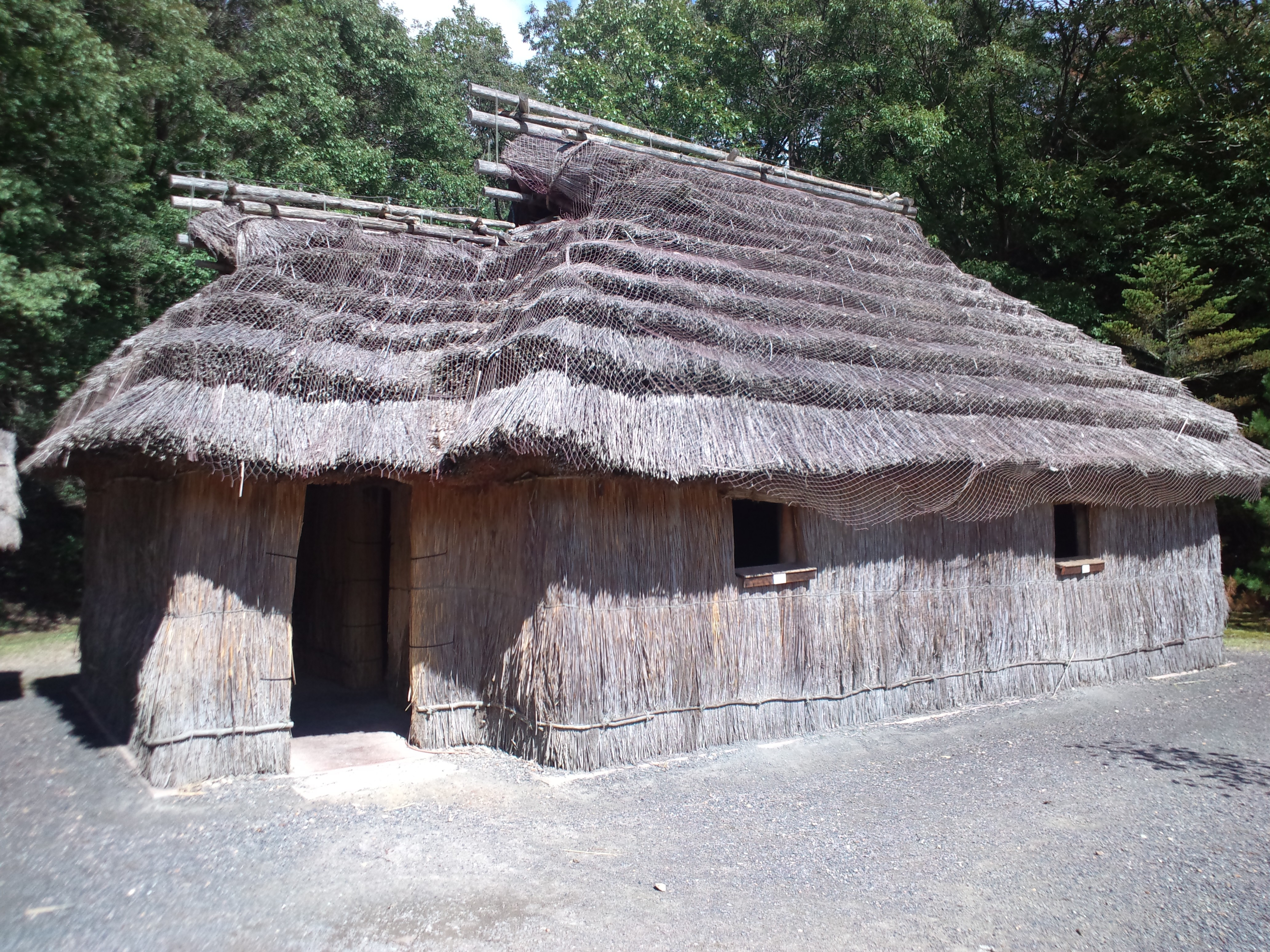
Ainu house in Hokkaido

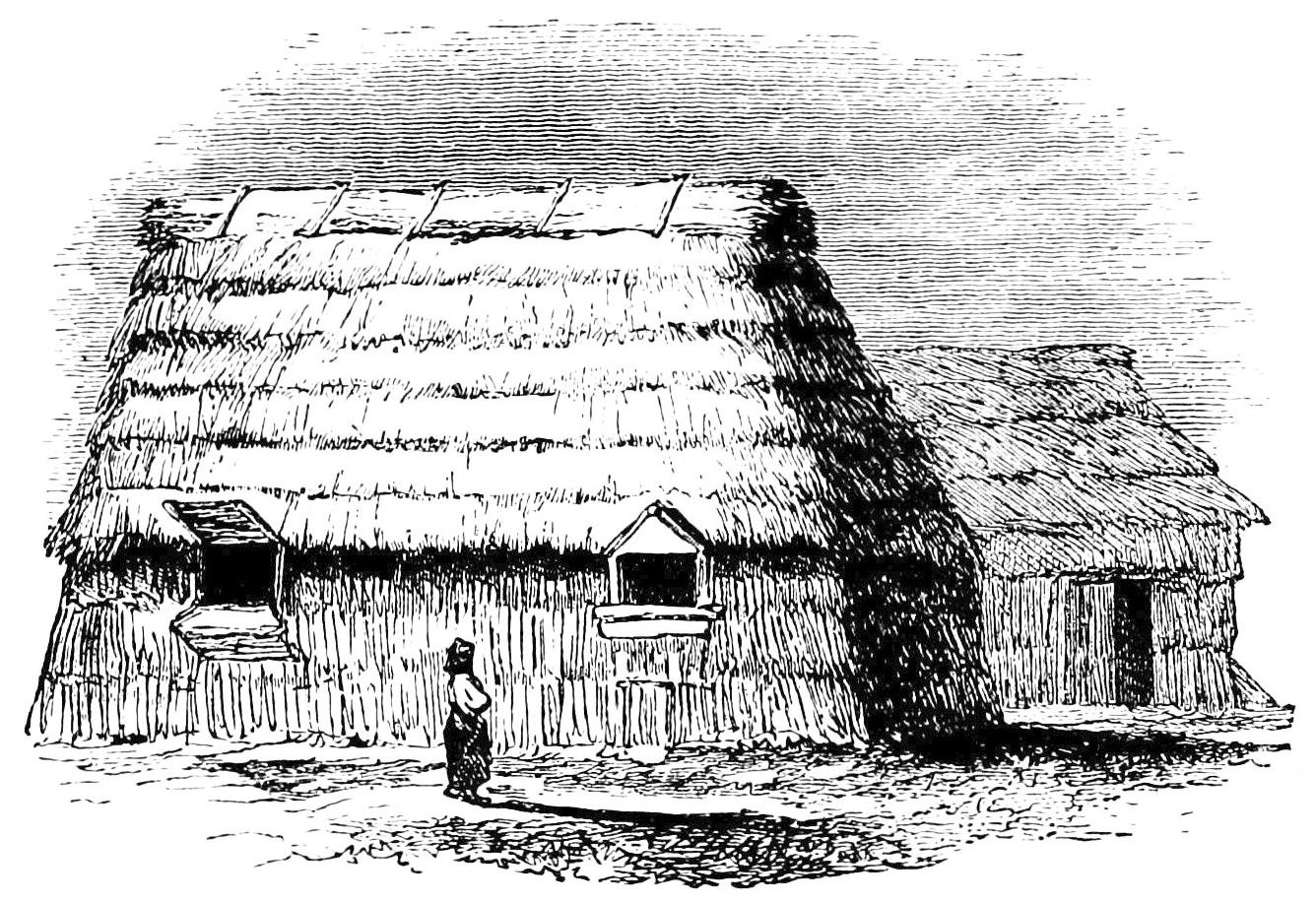
Ainu cise (from Popular Science Monthly, Volume 33, 1888)

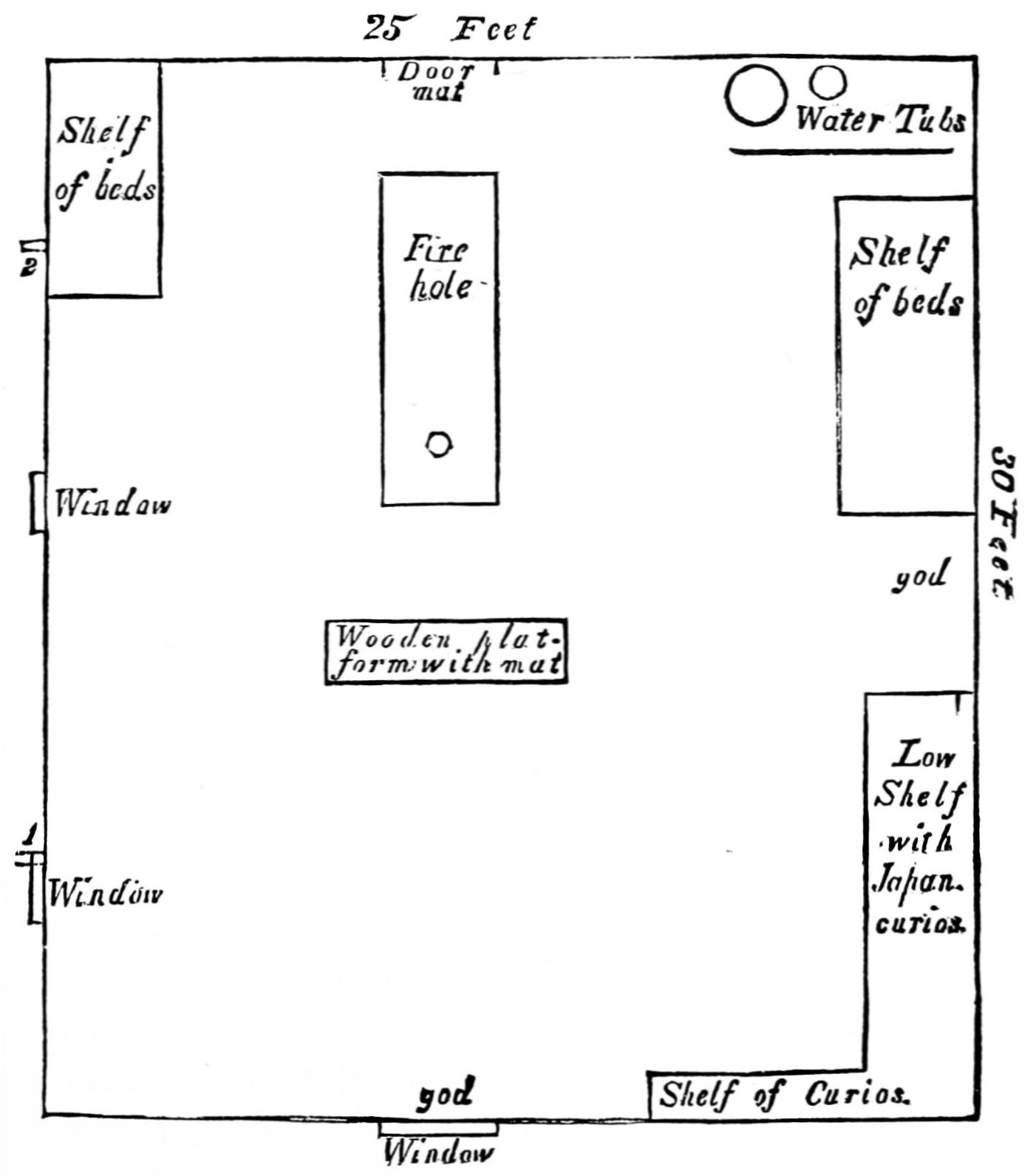
Plan of an Ainu cise

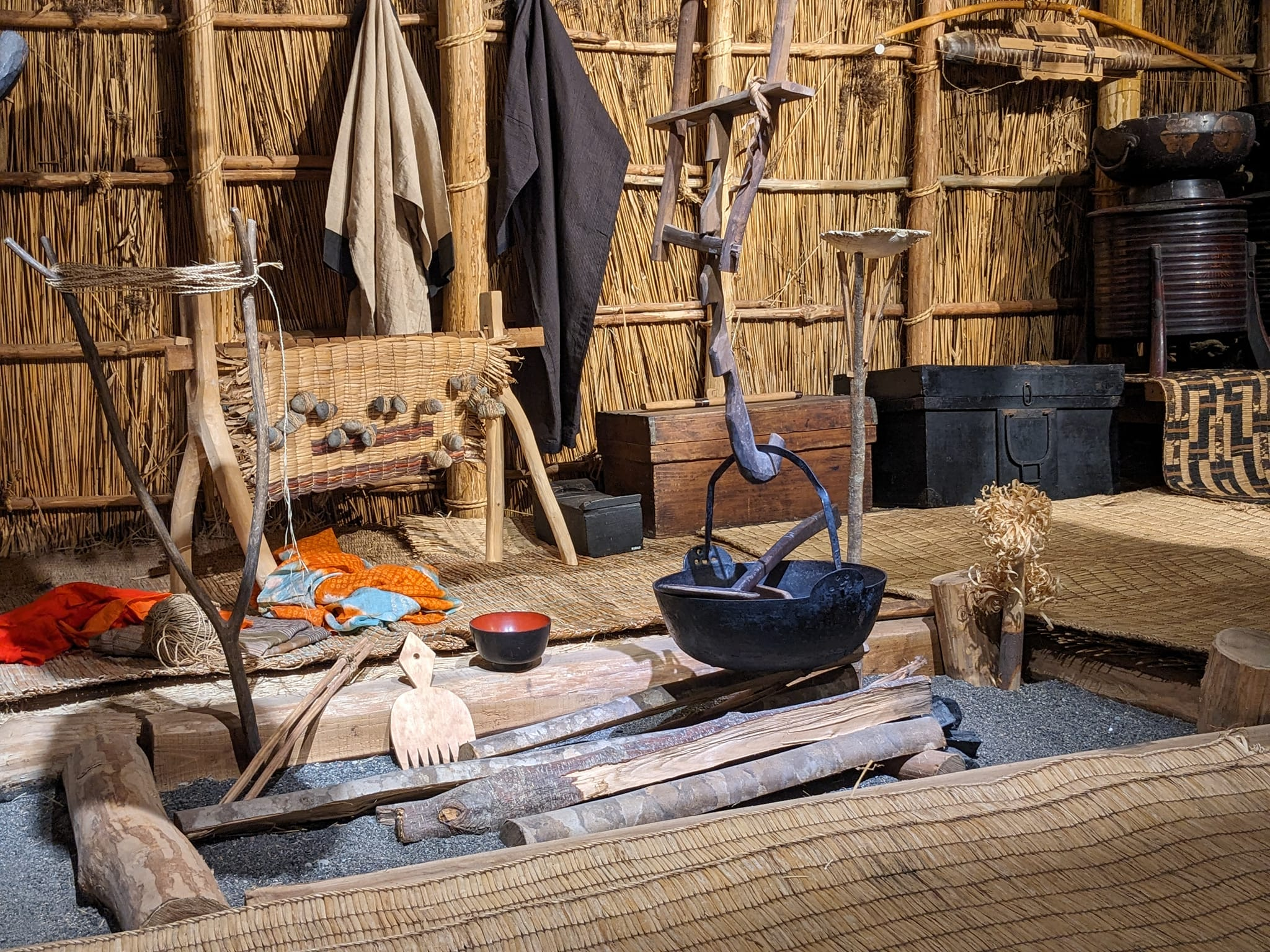
Gathering place around a cise fireplace

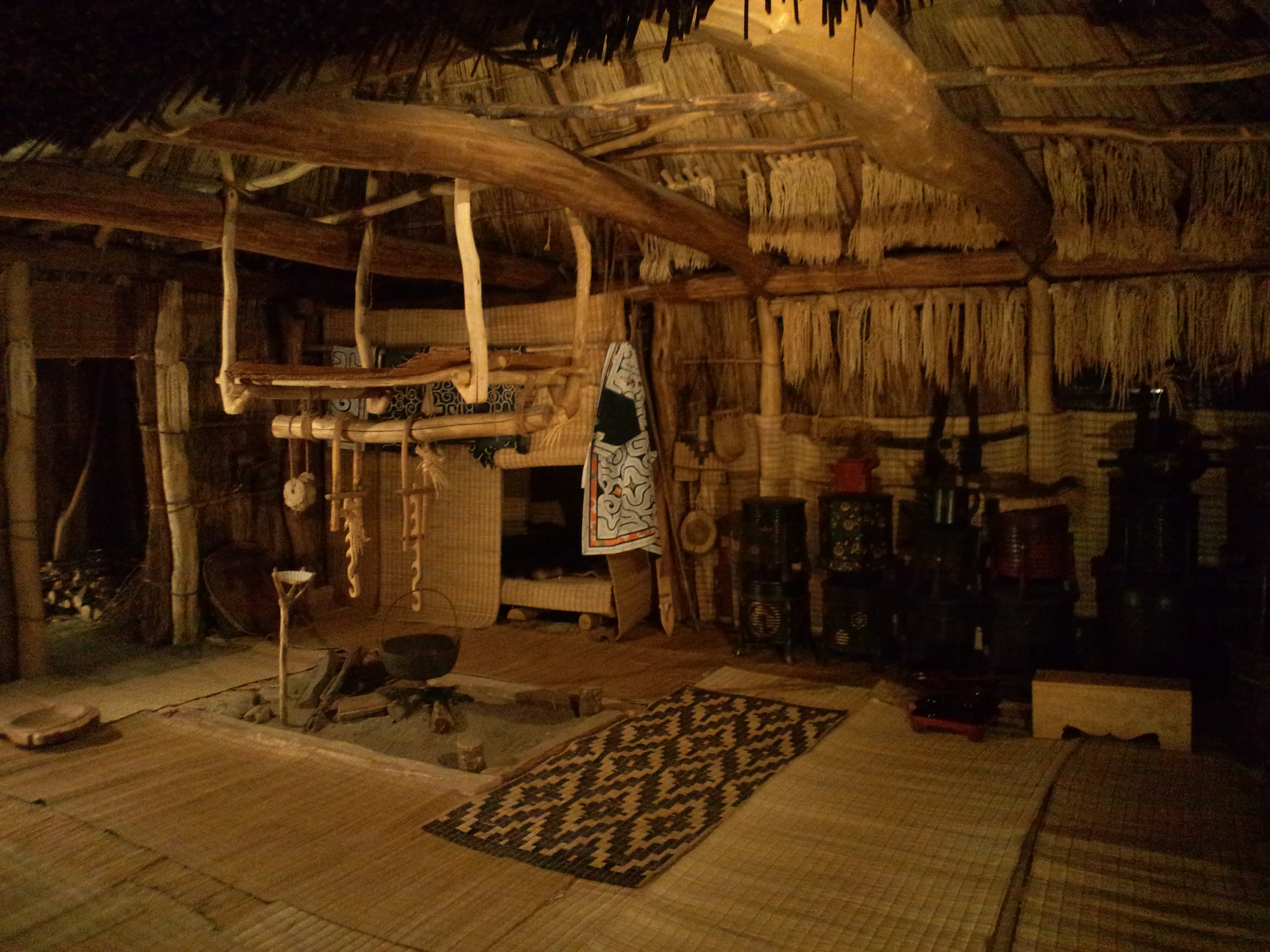
Interior of a cise in the Saru River basin

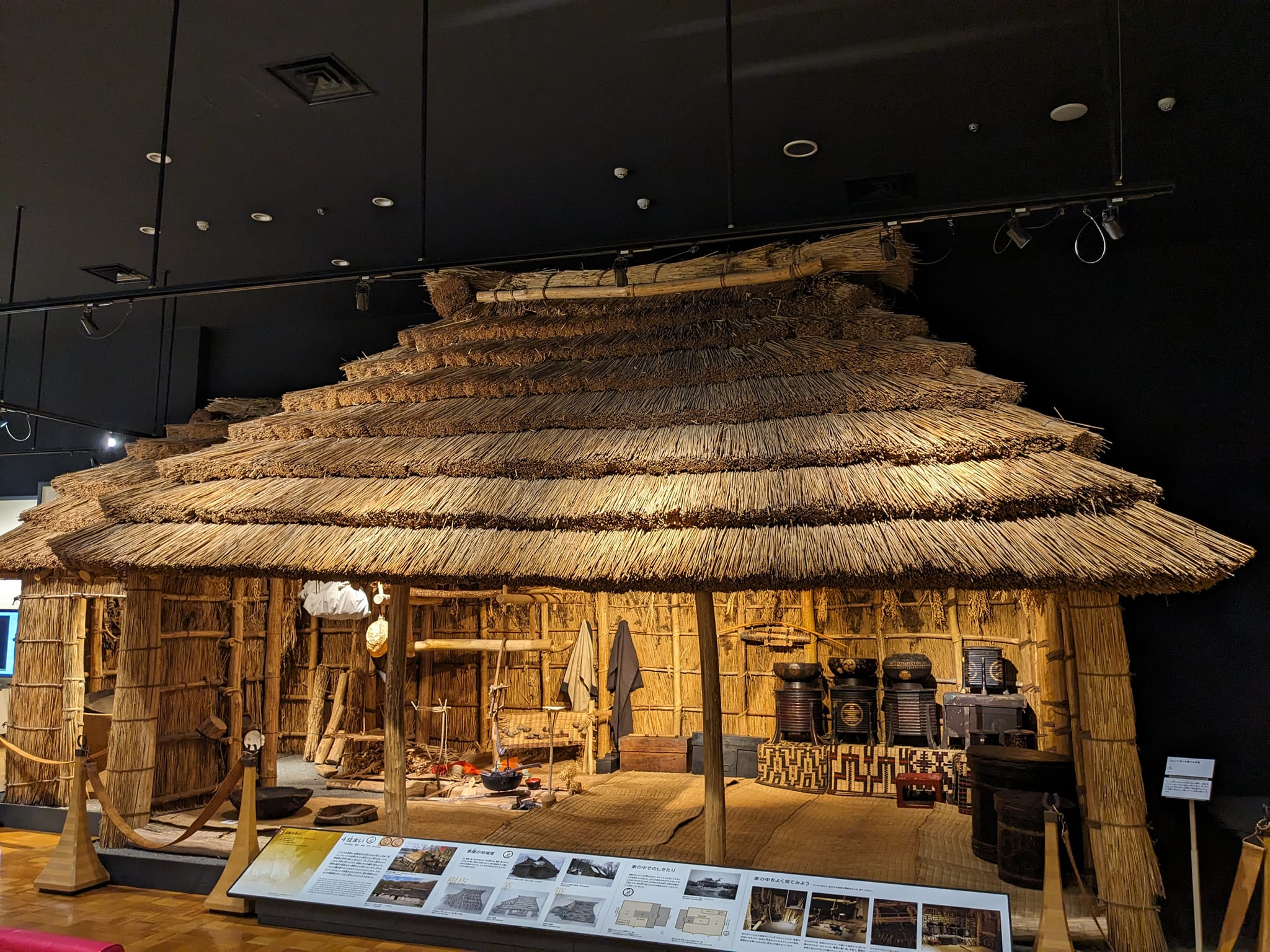
Ainu traditional house displayed at a museum

=== Traditions ===
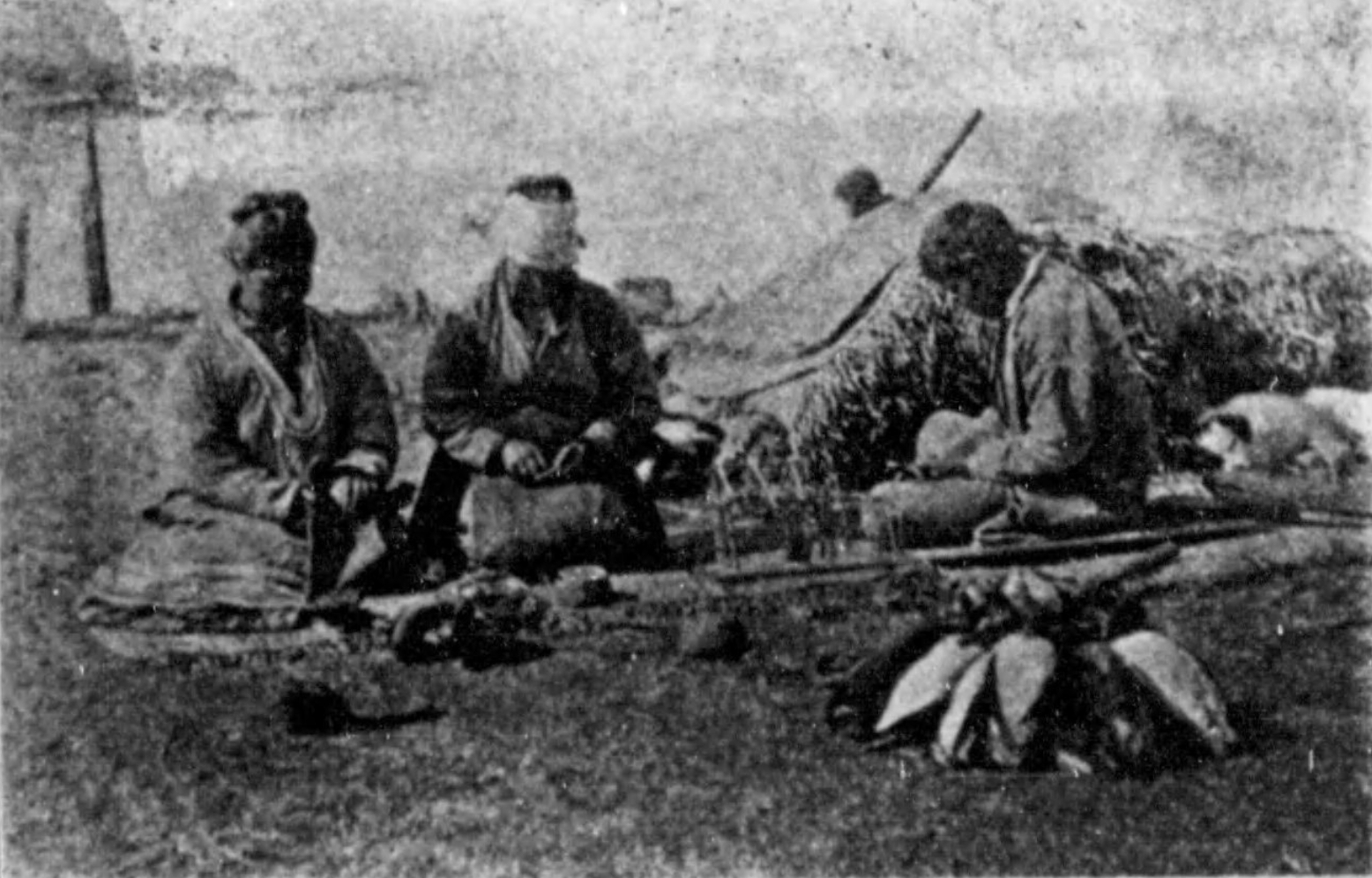
Chishima Ainu working

The Ainu people have various types of marriage. A child is traditionally promised in marriage by arrangement between their parents and the parents of their betrothed, or by a go-between. When the betrothed reach a marriageable age, they are told who their spouse is to be. There are also traditional marriages based on the mutual consent of both sexes. In some areas, when a daughter reaches a marriageable age, her parents allow her to live in a small room called a tunpu, annexed to the southern wall of the house. The parents choose her husband from the men who visit her.

The age of marriage is 17 to 18 years of age for men and 15 to 16 years of age for women, who are traditionally tattooed. At these ages, both sexes are regarded as adults.

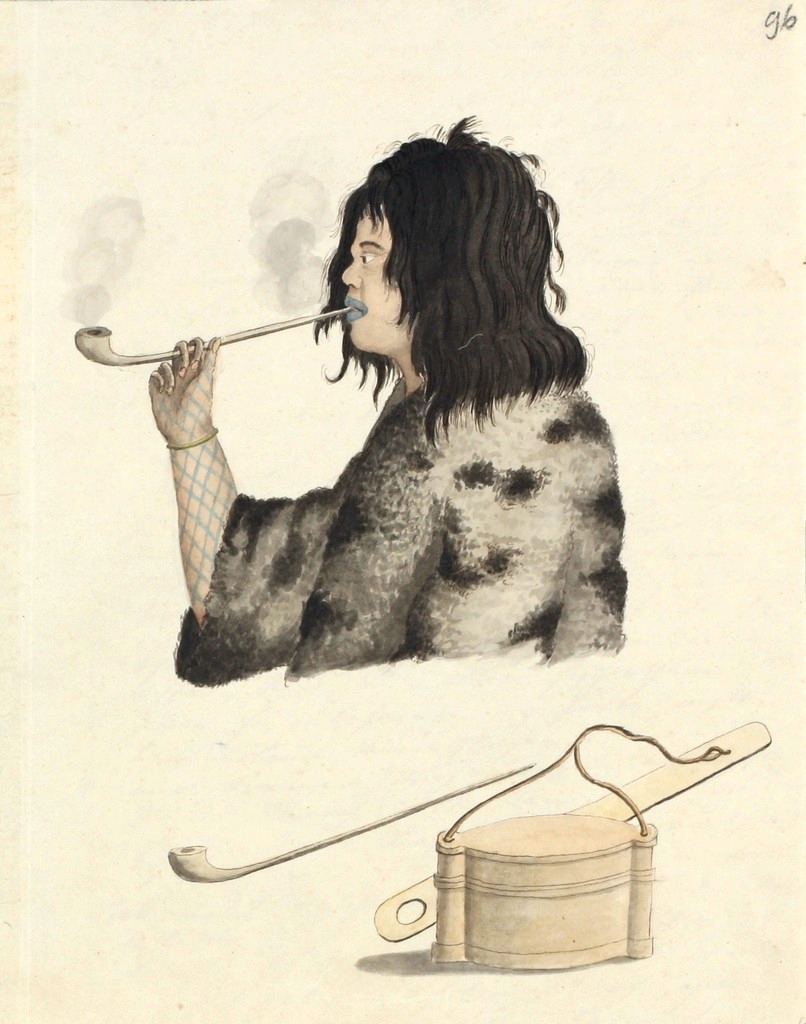
Depiction of an Ainu smoking

When a man proposes to a woman in traditional fashion, he visits her house, and she hands him a full bowl of rice. He then eats half of the rice and returns the rest to her. If the woman eats the remaining rice, she accepts his proposal. If she does not and instead puts it beside her, she rejects his proposal. When a man and woman become engaged or learn that their engagement has been arranged, they exchange gifts. The man sends her a small engraved knife, a workbox, a spool, and other gifts. She sends him embroidered clothes, coverings for the back of the hand, leggings, and other handmade clothes.

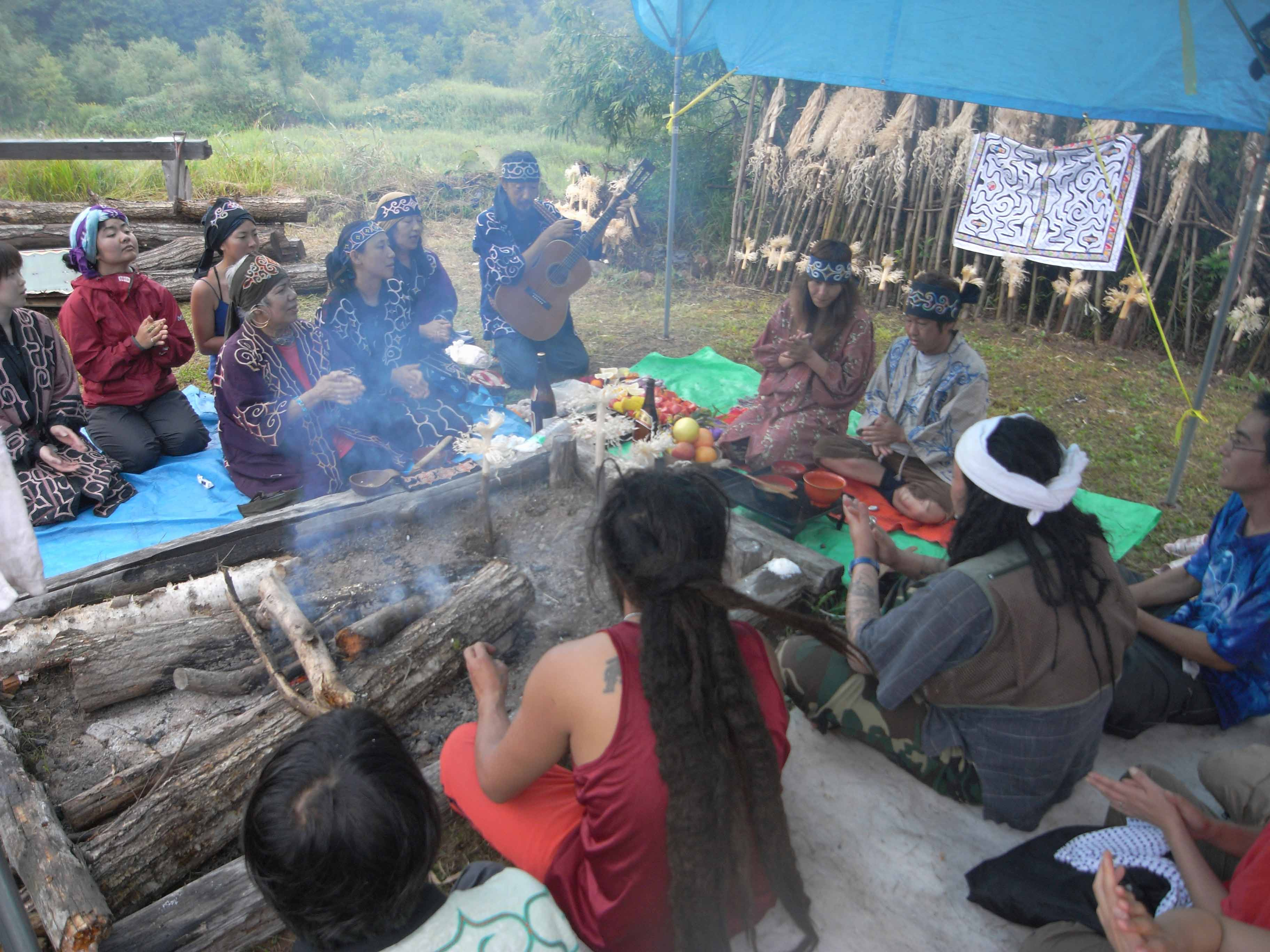
Ainu wedding in Hokkaido

The worn-out fabric of old clothing is used for baby clothes because soft cloth is good for their skin. Additionally, worn-out material was thought to protect babies from the gods of illness and demons, due to these entities' abhorrence of dirty things. Before a baby is breast-fed, they are given a decoction of the endodermis of an alder and the roots of butterburs to discharge impurities. Children are raised almost naked until about the ages of four to five. Even when they wear clothes, they do not wear belts and leave the front of their clothes open. Subsequently, they wear bark clothes without patterns, such as attush, until they come of age.

Ainu babies traditionally are not given permanent names when they are born. Rather, they are called by various temporary names until the age of two or three. Newborn babies are named ayay ("a baby's crying"), shipo, poyshi ("small excrement"), and shion ("old excrement"). Their tentative names have a portion meaning "excrement" or "old things" to ward off the demon of ill-health. Some children are named based on their behavior or habits; others are named after notable events or after their parents' wishes for their future. When children are named, they are never given the same names as others.

Men traditionally wear loincloths and have their hair dressed properly for the first time at age 15 to 16. Women are also considered adults at the age of 15 to 16. They traditionally wear underclothes called mour and have their hair dressed properly, with wound waistcloths called raunkut and ponkut around their bodies. When women reached the age of 12 or 13, the lips, hands, and arms were traditionally tattooed. When they reached the age of 15 or 16, their tattoos would be completed, indicating their qualification for marriage.

=== Religion ===
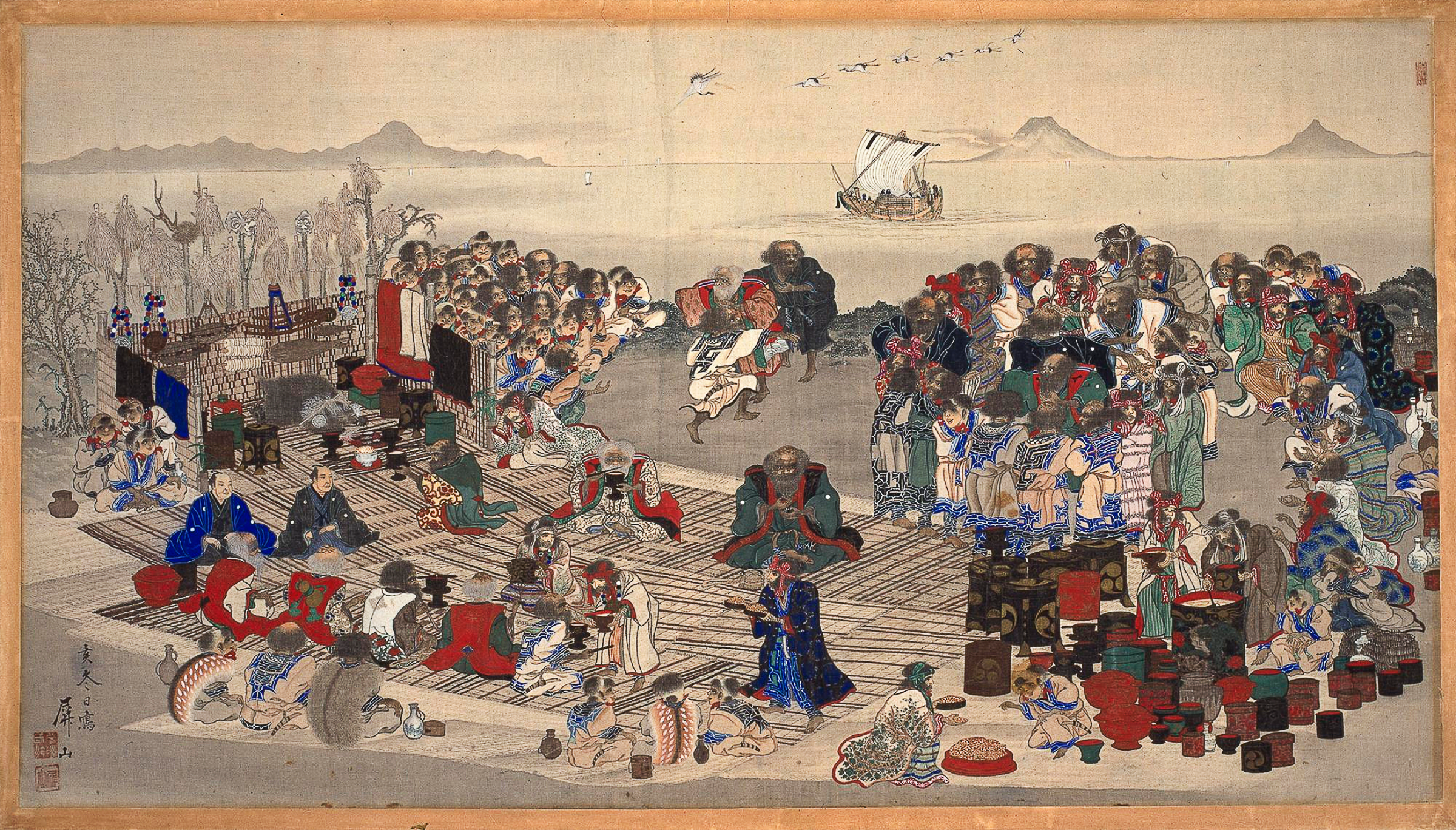
Painting of the Ainu iyomante, or bear spirit sending ceremony, in Hokkaido (1875)

The Ainu are traditionally animists, believing that everything in nature has a kamuy (spirit or god) on the inside. The most important include:

- Kamuy-huci, kamuy of the hearth
- Kim-un-kamuy, kamuy of bears and mountains
- Repun Kamuy, god of the sea, fishing, and marine animals
- Kotan-kar-kamuy, regarded as the creator of the world in the Ainu religion

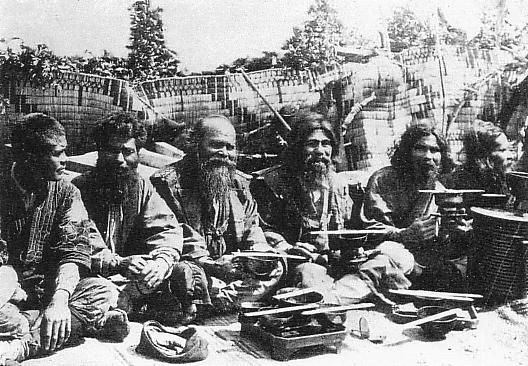
Ainu traditional ceremony, c. 1930

Ainu craftsmen, and the Ainu as a whole, traditionally believed that "anything made with deep sincerity was imbued with spirit and also became a [kamuy]". They also held the belief that ancestors and the power of the family could be invoked through certain patterns in art to protect them from malignant influences.

The Ainu religion has no priests by profession. Instead, the village chief performs whatever religious ceremonies are necessary. Ceremonies are confined to making libations of sake, saying prayers, and offering willow sticks with wooden shavings attached to them. They are placed on an altar used to "send back" the spirits of killed animals.

The Ainu are part of a larger collective of indigenous people who practice "arctolatry", or bear worship. The Ainu believe that the bear holds particular importance as Kim-un Kamuy's chosen method of delivering the gift of the bear's hide and meat to humans. Ainu ceremonies for sending back bears are called Iomante which dates back to the 11th century AD. This ritual took place over several years and included the capture of a bear cub, who was then raised as a member of the family. Eventually, they would ritually kill the bear. Since they treated the bear well in life, the Ainu believed that in death, the spirit of the bear would ensure the well-being of its adoptive community.

The Ainu people give thanks to the gods before eating and pray to Kamuy-huci in times of sickness. Kamuy-huci is also considered to be the Ainu people's most important female deity, thus cooking, which is associated closely with fire and the hearth, is a major symbol used in healing rites that occur right beside the hearth through shamans. Traditional Ainu belief holds that their spirits are immortal and that their spirits will be rewarded hereafter by ascending to kamuy mosir (Land of the Gods).

John Batchelor reported that the Ainu view the world as being a spherical ocean on which many islands float, a view based on the fact that the sun rises in the east and sets in the west. He wrote that they believe the world rests on the back of a large fish, which, when it moves, causes earthquakes.

Ainu assimilated into mainstream Japanese society have adopted Buddhism and Shintō; some northern Ainu were converted as members of the Russian Orthodox Church. Regarding Ainu communities in Shikotan and other areas that fall within the Russian sphere of cultural influence, there have been a few churches constructed, and some Ainu are reported to have accepted the Christian faith. There have also been reports that the Russian Orthodox Church has performed some missionary projects in the Sakhalin Ainu community. However, there are only reports of a few conversions to Christianity. Converts have been scorned as "Nutsa Ainu" (Russian Ainu) by other members of the Ainu community. Reports indicate that many Ainu have kept their faith in their traditional deities.

According to a 2012 survey conducted by Hokkaido University, a high percentage of Ainu are members of their household family religion, which is Buddhism (especially Nichiren Shōshū Buddhism). However, it is noted that, similar to the Japanese religious consciousness, there is not a strong feeling of identification with a particular religion, with Buddhist and traditional beliefs both being part of their daily lives.

Traditional dances are performed at ceremonies and banquets. Dancing is a part of the newly organized cultural festivals, and it is even done privately in daily life.

==== Funerals ====
When a person dies, their soul is thought to travel through the hearth of Kamuy-huci, the goddess of fire, to the afterlife. Burial customs included dressing the deceased in ceremonial clothing and surrounding them with their treasured possessions, which were intentionally broken to release their spirits. Funerals also included prayers and offerings to the fire kamuy, as well as verse laments expressing wishes for a smooth journey to the next world. Sometimes a burial would be followed by burning the residence of the dead. In the event of an unnatural death, there would be a speech raging against the gods. The graves were often isolated and were marked by carved poles called "kuwa."

==== Graves ====
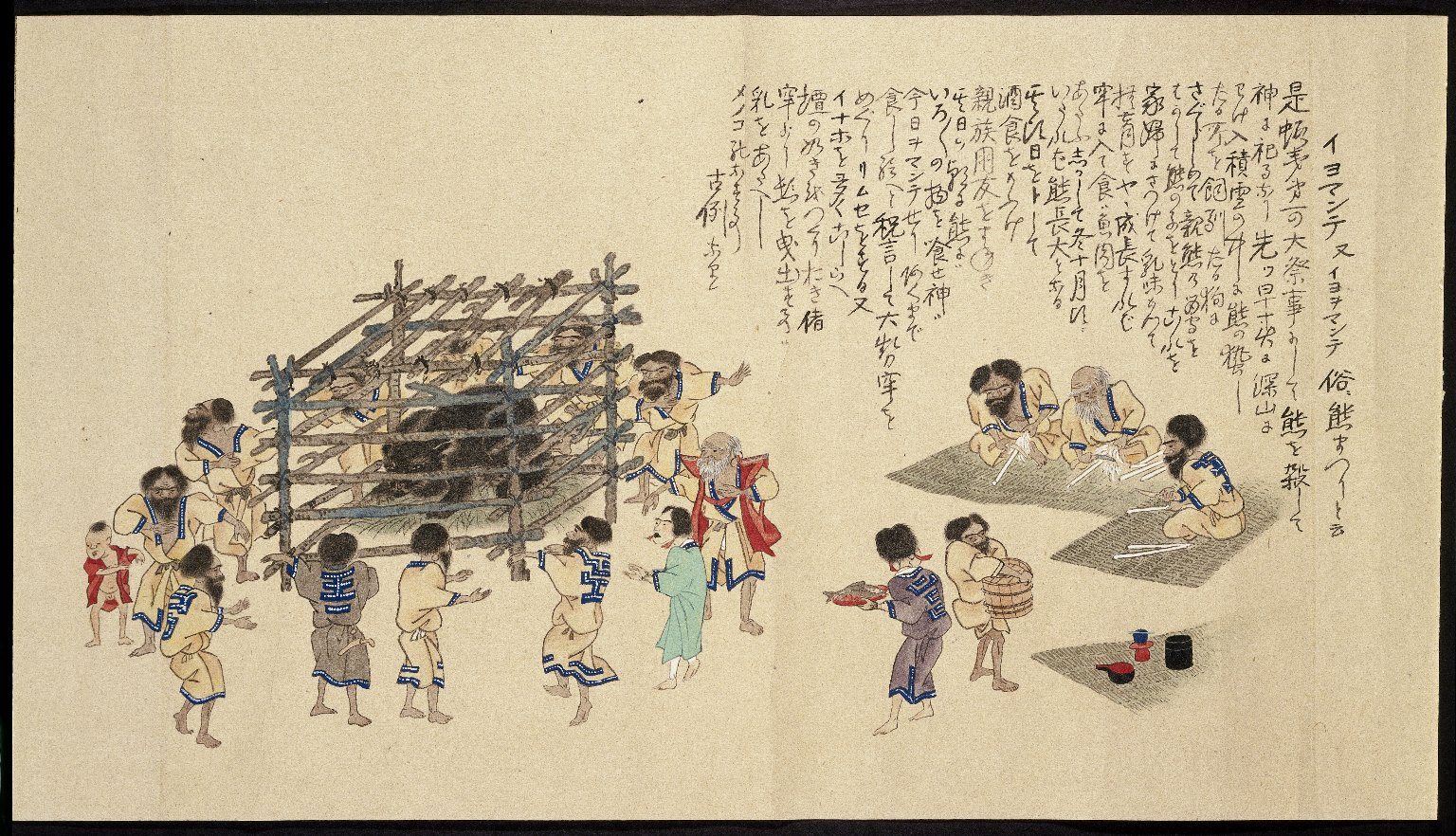
Ainu people, c. 1840

Archaeological excavations have revealed that Ainu graves are typically oval or rectangular, with the deceased primarily buried in an extended dorsal position, though some were interred in a crouched posture. Offerings placed around the head provide insight into its orientation, based on the distribution of burial accessories, even when skeletal remains are absent. Over 1,000 burials from the Pre-Ainu Period have been uncovered and cataloged by Utagawa, with about 400 featuring precisely documented orientations. Earlier excavation reports predominantly referenced magnetic north, according to current Hokkaido data. At the Tohohata Burial site in Shin-Hidaka Town, 75 burials have been excavated, and with only one exception, all exhibited a southeast orientation near the Winter Solstice sunrise point. In contrast, at the Motomonbetsu site in Monbetsu Town, northeastern Hokkaido, burial orientations are more varied, with east, southeast, north, and northwest alignments being present. This variation suggests regional differences in burial orientation mirroring patterns seen in house alignments.

== Geography ==
The traditional locations of the Ainu are Hokkaido, Sakhalin, the Kuril Islands, Kamchatka, and the northern Tōhoku region. Many of the place names that remain in Hokkaido and the Kuril Islands stem from their Ainu place names.

In 1756, a kanjō-bugyō (a high-ranking Edo period official responsible for finance) implemented an assimilation policy for Ainu engaged in fishing in the Tsugaru Peninsula. From that point on, Ainu culture rapidly disappeared from Honshu.

=== Russia ===
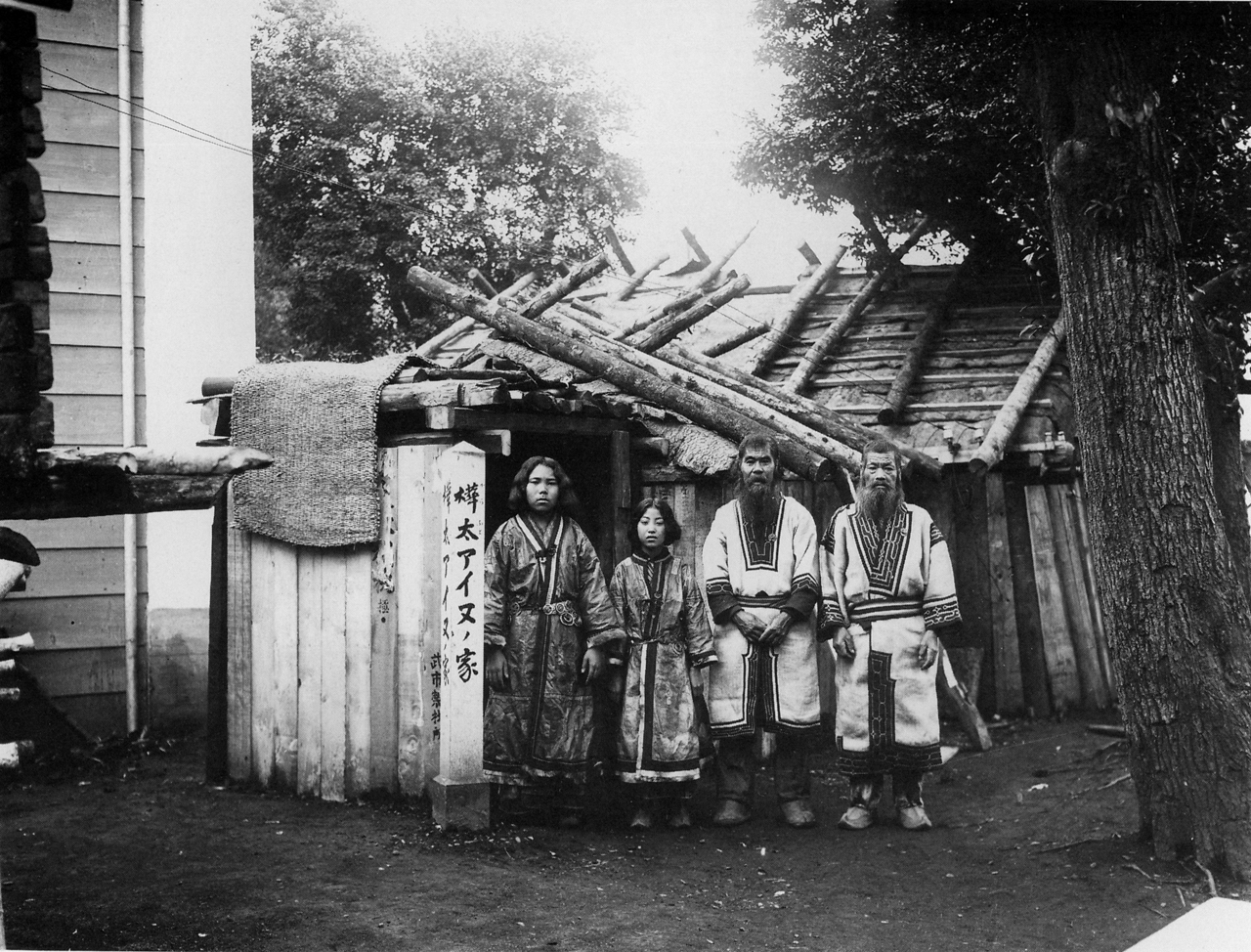
Karafuto (Sakhalin) Ainu family behind their house in 1912

As a result of the 1875 Treaty of St. Petersburg, Japanese-administered Sakhalin was given to Russia, while the Kuril Islands—along with their Ainu inhabitants—came under Japanese administration. A total of 83 North Kuril Ainu arrived in Petropavlovsk-Kamchatsky on September 18, 1877, after they decided to remain under Russian rule. They refused the offer by Russian officials to move to new reservations in the Commander Islands. An agreement was reached in 1881 between the North Kuril Ainu and Russian authorities which saw the Ainu settle in the village of Yavin, Kamchatka. In March 1881, the group left Petropavlovsk and began the long journey to Yavin by foot. Four months later, they reached their new homes. Another village, Golygino, was founded later. Nine more Ainu arrived from Japan in 1884. According to the 1897 Census of Russia, Golygino had a population of 57 (all Ainu) and Yavin a population of 39 (33 Ainu & 6 Russian). Later, under Soviet rule both villages were forced to disband, and the inhabitants forcibly moved to the ethnic Russian-dominated Zaporozhye rural settlement in Ust-Bolsheretsky Raion. As a result of intermarriage, the three ethnic groups assimilated to form the Kamchadal community. On 7 February 1953, K. Omelchenko, the Soviet Minister of the Protection of Military and State Secrets banned the press from publishing any information on the Ainu still living in the USSR. The order was finally revoked after two decades.

As of 2015, the North Kuril Ainu of Zaporozhye form the largest Ainu subgroup in Russia. On Sakhalin Island, a few dozen people identify themselves as Sakhalin Ainu, but many more with partial Ainu ancestry do not acknowledge it. Most of the 888 Japanese people living in Russia as of 2010, are of mixed Japanese–Ainu ancestry, although they generally do not acknowledge it, since full Japanese ancestry gives them the right of visa-free entry to Japan. Similarly, although no one identifies as Ainu today in Khabarovsk Krai, there are a large number of ethnic Ulch people with partial Ainu ancestry.

In the 2010 Census of Russia, nearly 100 people tried to register themselves as ethnic Ainu in the village, but the governing council of Kamchatka Krai rejected their claim and enrolled them as ethnic Kamchadal. In 2011, the leader of the Ainu community in Kamchatka, Alexei Vladimirovich Nakamura, requested that Vladimir Ilyukhin (Governor of Kamchatka) and Boris Nevzorov (Chairman of the State Duma) include the Ainu in the central list of the Indigenous small-numbered peoples of the North, Siberia and the Far East. This request was also denied.

Ethnic Ainu living in Sakhalin Oblast and Khabarovsk Krai are not organized politically. According to Alexei Nakamura, as of 2012, only 205 Ainu live in Russia (up from just 12 people who self-identified as Ainu in 2008). They, along with the Kurile Kamchadals (Itelmen of the Kuril Islands), are fighting for official recognition. Since the Ainu are not recognized in the official list of the peoples living in Russia, they are counted as people without nationality, as ethnic Russians, or as Kamchadals.

The Ainu have emphasized that they were the natives of the Kuril Islands, and that the Japanese and Russians were both invaders. In 2004, the small Ainu community living in Russia in Kamchatka Krai wrote a letter to Vladimir Putin, urging him to reconsider any move to award the Southern Kuril Islands to Japan. In the letter, they blamed the Japanese, the Tsarist Russians, and the Soviets for crimes against the Ainu, such as killings and assimilation; they also urged him to recognize the Japanese genocide against the Ainu people. This proposal was rejected.

As of 2012, both the Kuril Ainu and Kuril Kamchadal ethnic groups lack the fishing and hunting rights that the Russian government grants to the indigenous tribal communities of the far north.

In March 2017, Alexei Nakamura, a community leader of the Kamchatka Ainu, revealed that plans for an Ainu village to be created in Petropavlovsk and plans for an Ainu dictionary are underway.

== Population ==
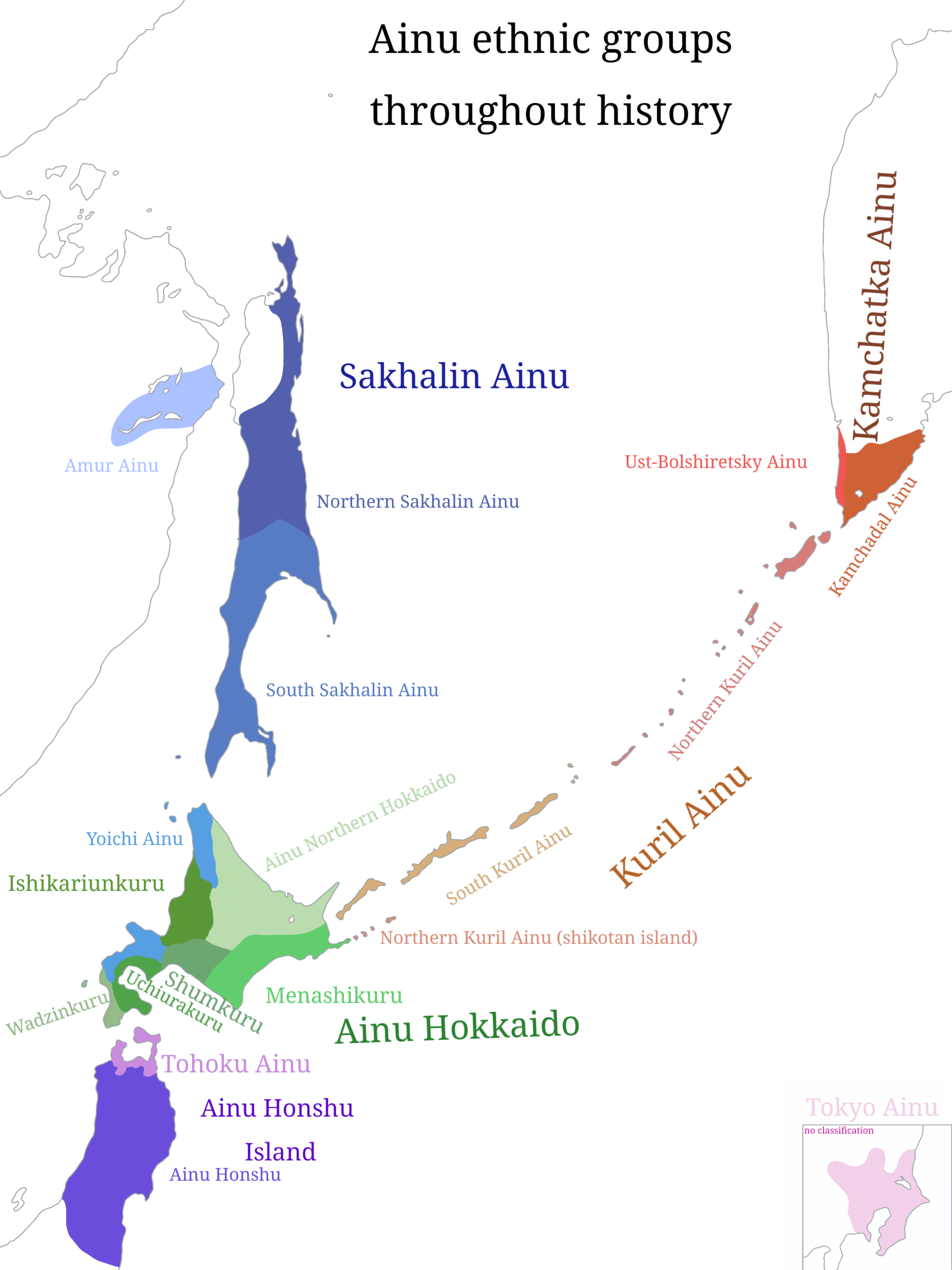
A map showing the historical distribution of the different subgroups of the Ainu

The population of the Ainu during the Edo period was a maximum of 26,800; it has since declined, due in part to the spread of infectious diseases.

According to the 1897 Russian census, 1,446 Ainu native speakers lived in Russian territory.

Currently, there is no Ainu category in the Japanese national census, and no fact-finding has been conducted by national institutions. Therefore, the exact number of Ainu people is unknown. However, multiple surveys have been conducted that provide an indication of the total population.

According to a 2006 Hokkaido Agency survey, there were 23,782 Ainu people in Hokkaido. When viewed by the branch office (currently the Promotion Bureau), there are many in the Iburi / Hidaka branch office. The definition of "Ainu" by the Hokkaido Agency in this survey is "a person who seems to have inherited the blood of Ainu" or "the same livelihood as those with marriage or adoption." Additionally, if the other person is declared not to be "Ainu", then it is not subject to investigation.

A 1971 survey determined an Ainu population of 77,000. Another survey yielded a total of 200,000 Ainu living in Japan. However, there are no other surveys that support this high estimate.

Many Ainu live outside of Hokkaido. A 1988 survey estimated that the population of Ainu living in Tokyo was 2,700. According to a 1989 survey report on Utari living in Tokyo, it is estimated that the Ainu population of the Tokyo area alone exceeds 10% of Ainu living in Hokkaido; there are more than 10,000 Ainu living in the Tokyo metropolitan area.

In addition to Japan and Russia, it was reported in 1992 that there was a descendant of Kuril Ainu in Poland, but there are also indications that they are a descendant of the Aleut. On the other hand, the descendant of the children born in Poland by the Polish anthropologist Bronisław Piłsudski, who was a leading Ainu researcher and left a vast amount of research material, such as photographs and wax tubes, was born in Japan.

According to a 2017 survey, the Ainu population in Hokkaido is about 13,000. This is a sharp drop from 24,000 in 2006. However, this is partially due to a decrease in membership in the Ainu Association of Hokkaido, which is cooperating with the survey. Additionally, interest in protecting personal information has increased. It is thought that the number of individuals who cooperate is declining and that it does not match the actual population of Ainu people.

== Institutions ==
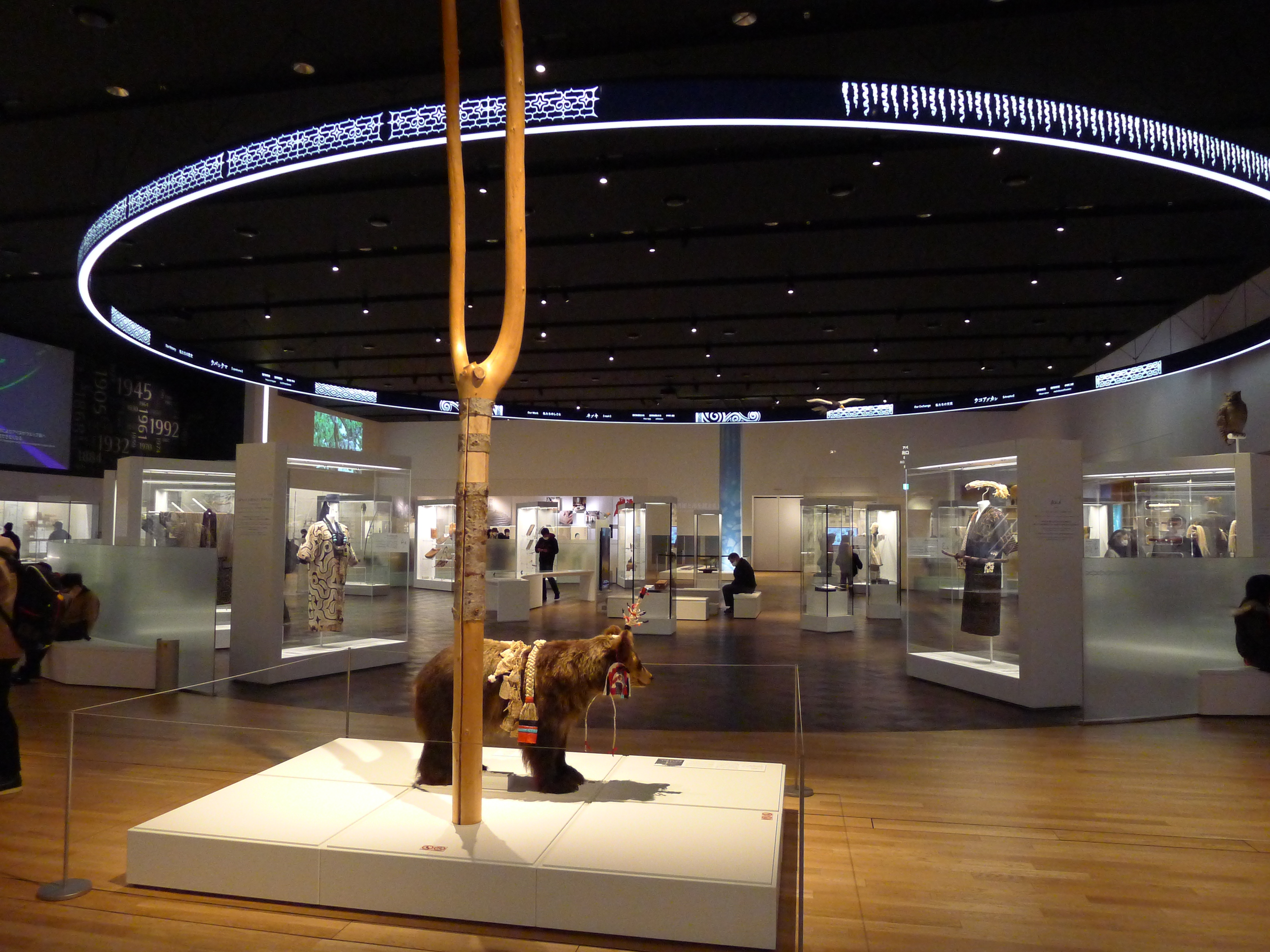
National Ainu Museum interior

Most Hokkaidō Ainu, and some other Ainu, are members of an umbrella group called the Hokkaido Ainu Association. The organization changed its name to Hokkaido Utari Association in 1961 due to the fact that the word Ainu was often used in a derogatory manner. It was changed back to the Hokkaido Ainu Association in 2009 after the passing of the new law regarding the Ainu. The organization was originally controlled by the government to speed Ainu assimilation and integration into the Japanese nation-state. It is now run exclusively by Ainu and operates mostly independently of the government.

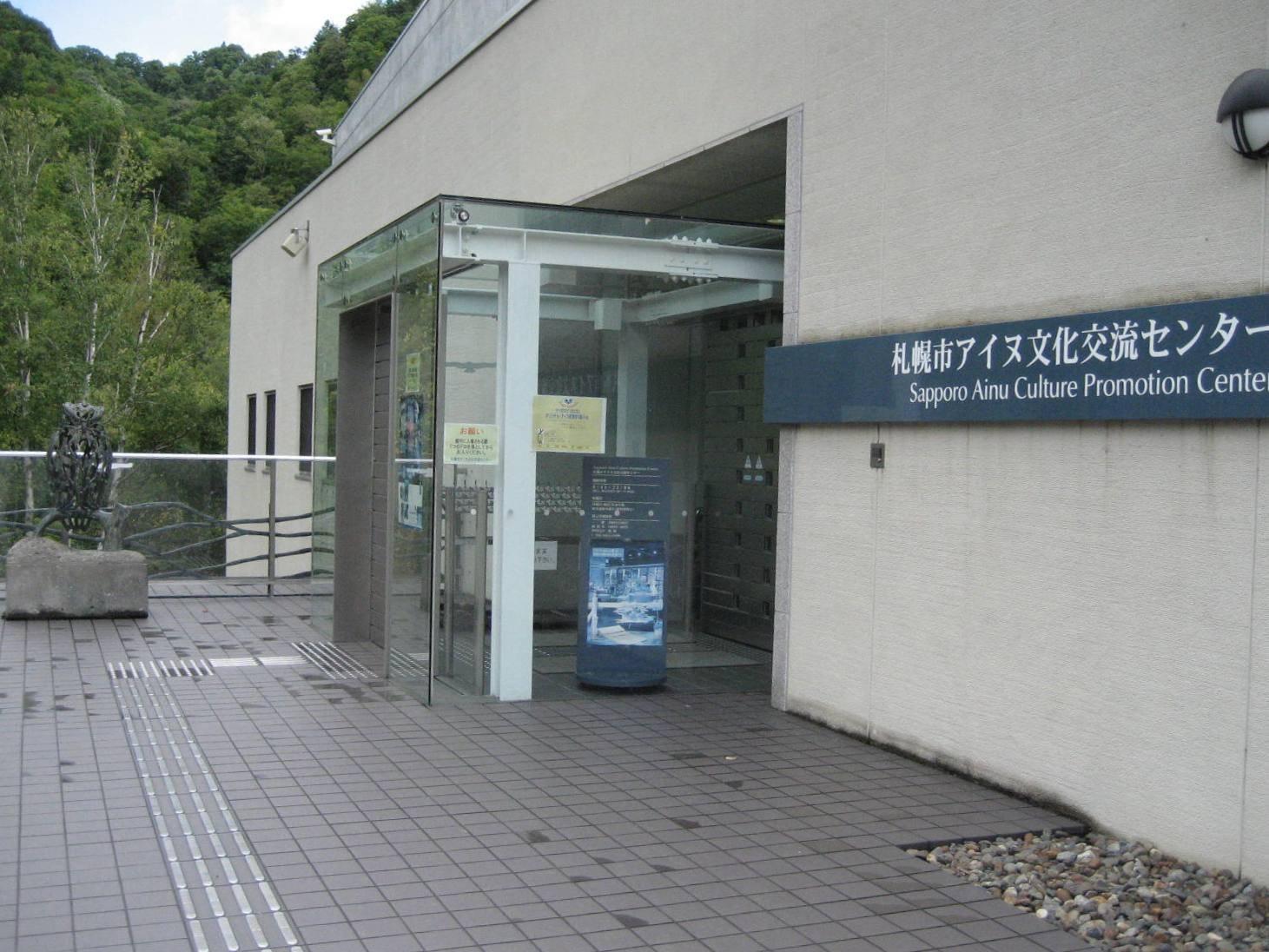
Ainu cultural promotion center and museum in Sapporo (Sapporo Pirka Kotan)

Other key institutions include The Foundation for Research and Promotion of Ainu Culture (FRPAC), established by the Japanese government after the enactment of the Ainu Culture Law in 1997; the Hokkaidō University Center for Ainu and Indigenous Studies, established in 2007; and various museums and cultural centers. The Ainu people living in Tokyo have also developed a vibrant political and cultural community.

Since late 2011, the Ainu have developed cultural exchange and cooperation with the Sámi people of northern Europe. Both the Sámi and the Ainu participate in the organization for Arctic indigenous peoples and the Sámi research office in Lapland (Finland).

Currently, there are several Ainu museums and cultural parks. Some of them are:

- National Ainu Museum
- Kawamura Kaneto Ainu Museum
- Ainu Kotan
- Ainu Folklore Museum
- Hokkaido Museum of Northern Peoples
- Nibutani Ainu Culture Museum
- Shinhidaka Ainu Museum

== Issues ==
=== Standard of living ===
The discrimination and negative stereotypes assigned to the Ainu have manifested in lower levels of education, income, and participation in the economy as compared to their ethnically Japanese counterparts. In surveying conducted by Ryoko Tahara, nearly 30 percent of Ainu women find reading Japanese to be difficult, and one third find it difficult to write Japanese, leading many to take on unstable forms of employment. The Ainu community in Hokkaido in 1993 received welfare payments at a 2.3 times higher rate than that of Hokkaido as a whole. They also had an 8.9% lower enrollment rate from junior high school to high school and a 15.7% lower enrollment into college from high school. Ainu women specifically suffer from dual economic disadvantage, meaning Ainu households reportedly made 41.6% less on average than the national average. Due to this noticeable and growing gap, the Japanese government has been lobbied by activists to research the Ainu's standard of living nationwide. The Japanese government said it would provide ¥7 million (US$63,000), beginning in 2015, to conduct surveys nationwide on this matter.

=== Ethnic homogeneity in Japan ===
The existence of the Ainu has challenged the notion of ethnic homogeneity in post-WWII Japan. After the demise of the multi-ethnic Empire of Japan in 1945, successive governments forged a single Japanese identity by advocating monoculturalism and denying the existence of more than one ethnic group in Japan.

The Ainu were first recognised as an indigenous people in 1997, which began the process of claiming indigenous rights under national and international frameworks. Following the United Nations Declaration on the Rights of Indigenous Peoples in 2007, Hokkaido politicians pressured the government to recognize Ainu rights. Prime Minister Fukuda Yasuo answered a parliamentary question on May 20, 2008, by stating,

It is a historical fact that the Ainu are the earlier arrivers of the northern Japanese archipelago, in particular Hokkaido. The Japanese government acknowledges the Ainu to be an ethnic minority as it has maintained a unique cultural identity and has a unique language and religion. However, as there is no established international definition of "indigenous people", the government is not in a position to conclude whether the Ainu should be referred as "indigenous people"...

On June 6, 2008, the National Diet of Japan passed a non-binding, bipartisan resolution calling upon the government to recognize the Ainu as indigenous people.

In 2019, eleven years after this resolution, the Diet finally passed an act recognizing the Ainu as an indigenous people of Japan. Despite this recognition of the Ainu as an ethnically distinct group, political figures in Japan continue to define ethnic homogeneity as key to the overall Japanese national identity. For example, then Deputy Prime Minister Tarō Asō notably claimed in 2020, "No other country but this one has lasted for as long as 2,000 years with one language, one ethnic group, and one dynasty."

=== Representation ===
Representations of the Ainu have seen an increase in Japanese popular culture and media from the late 20th to 21st centuries. This has included multiple characters in anime and video games which address Ainu issues, including the manga and anime series Golden Kamuy which sets its story in early 20th century Hokkaido, where the protagonist learns about Ainu culture and their history of oppression and resistance from an Ainu guide, and the manga and anime Shaman King, where one of the main characters, Horohoro, is an Ainu shaman aided by a Korpokkur spirit. Horohoro's goal in the story is to restore the ecosystem on Hokkaido to its state prior to the mass development that has occurred as part of colonization. Hiromu Arakawa's manga Silver Spoon is set in Hokkaidō and includes a chapter explicitly covering the history of the island and of the Ainu people. Arakawa in a 2006 interview detailed how the repeated themes of racial discrimination across her works stem from her own family's histories as settlers who displaced Ainu in Hokkaidō.

The 2020 coming-of-age film Ainu Mosir portrays Kanto, a sensitive 14-year-old Ainu boy who struggles to come to terms with his father's death and his identity. The film also focuses on the dilemma of the controversial bear sacrifice ritual under the shadow of modern Japanese society and the Ainu's heavy reliance on tourists for their livelihood. Along with other restless teenagers, Kanto is under pressure to retain his Ainu identity and participate in the cultural rituals. In the 2025 video game Ghost of Yōtei, the player is able to visit an Ainu village to partake in various minor quests. Ainu artefacts make up the main series of collectibles that the player can collect through the course of the game. The game developers employed an Ainu cultural advisor to attempt to portray the Ainu "respectfully" in the game.

=== Archaeology ===
Many findings regarding the Ainu people have been made with a Western mindset, and some movements have advocated for instead incorporating the Ainu people into archaeological work, including the "Kamui-nomi" ceremony at archaeological sites. This is a traditional Ainu ritual performed with the intention of giving prayers to their gods for safe travel or well-being. During the ritual, sacred shaved sticks called "inaw" are used, and then later they are offered to the Ishikari River as part of the ceremony. This shift is due to archaeology being viewed as a colonialist endeavor by many Indigenous communities such as the Ainu, as Indigenous pasts are very different from archaeologists' conclusions, which impact Indigenous knowledge.

Historically, their language, traditions, and spiritual practices were marginalized under policies aimed at integrating them into the dominant cultures. This led to significant losses in their cultural heritage, with the Ainu language now critically endangered. However, recent efforts have focused on revitalizing Ainu identity through the preservation of language, traditional arts, and spiritual practices.

=== Ethnic rights ===
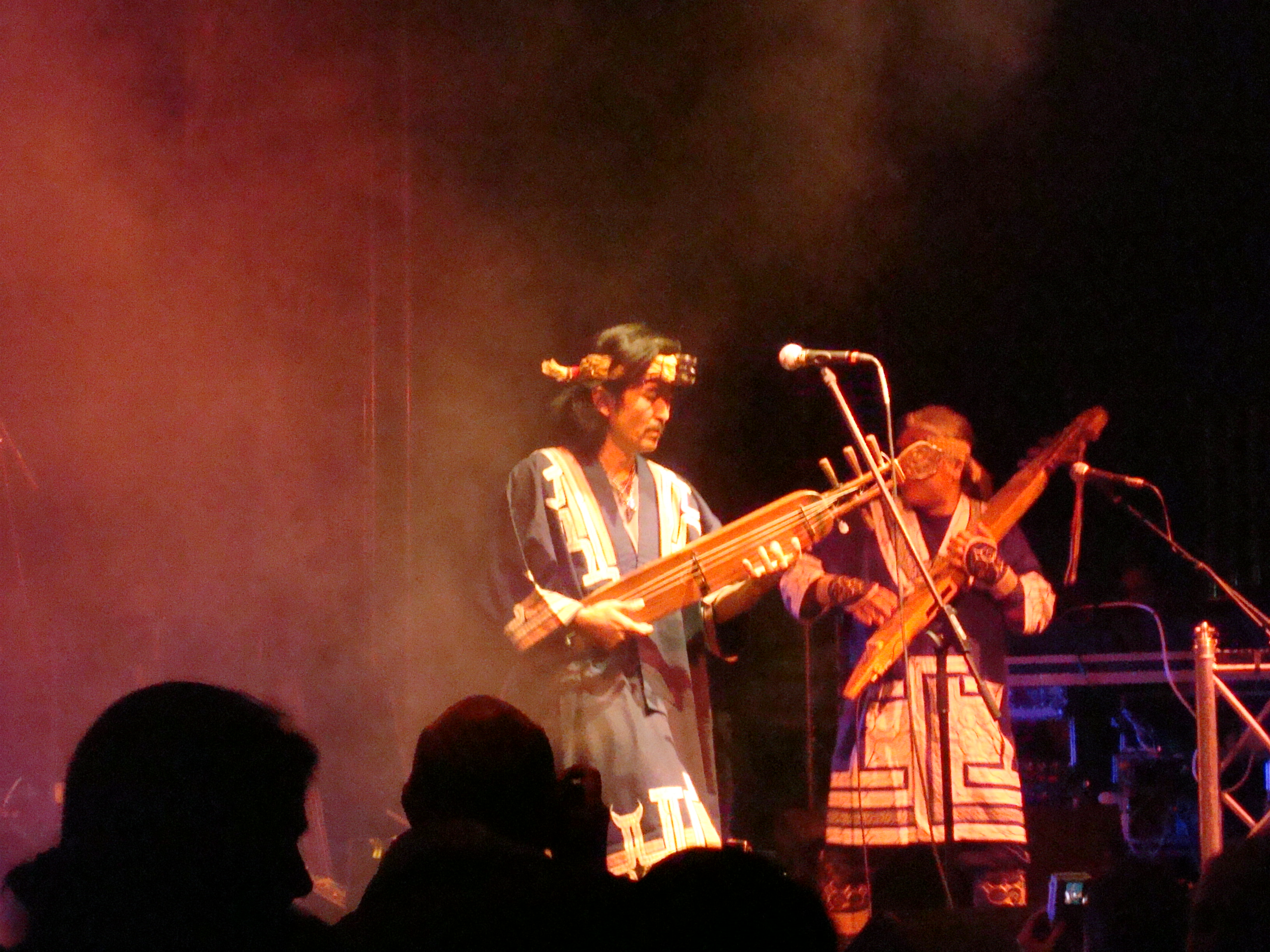
The Oki Dub Ainu Band, led by the Ainu Japanese musician Oki, in Germany in 2007

==== Legal action ====
On March 27, 1997, the Sapporo District Court decided a landmark case that, for the first time in Japanese history, recognized the right of the Ainu people to enjoy their distinct culture and traditions. The case arose because of a 1978 government plan to build two dams in the Saru River watershed in southern Hokkaidō. The dams were part of a series of development projects under the Second National Development Plan that were intended to industrialize the north of Japan. The planned location for one of the dams was across the valley floor near Nibutani village, the home of a large community of Ainu people and an important center of Ainu culture and history. When the government commenced construction on the Nibutani Dam in the early 1980s, two Ainu landowners refused to agree to the expropriation of their property. These landowners were Tadashi Kaizawa and Shigeru Kayano—well-known and important leaders in the Ainu community. After Kaizawa and Kayano declined to sell their land, the Hokkaidō Development Bureau applied for and was subsequently granted a Project Authorization, which required the men to vacate their land. When their appeal of the Authorization was denied, Kayano and Kaizawa's son Koichi (Kaizawa died in 1992) filed suit against the Hokkaidō Development Bureau.

The final decision denied the relief sought by the plaintiffs for pragmatic reasons (the dam was already in place), but the decision was nonetheless heralded as a landmark victory for the Ainu people. Nearly all of the plaintiffs' claims were recognized. Moreover, the decision marked the first time Japanese case law acknowledged the Ainu as an indigenous people and contemplated the responsibility of the Japanese nation to the indigenous people within its borders. The decision included broad fact-finding that underscored the long history of the oppression of the Ainu people by Japan's majority, referred to as wajin in the case, and discussions about the case. The decision was issued on March 27, 1997. Because of the broad implications for Ainu rights, the plaintiffs decided not to appeal the decision, which became final two weeks later. After the decision was issued, on May 8, 1997, the Diet passed the Ainu Culture Law and repealed the Ainu Protection Act—the 1899 law that had been the vehicle of Ainu oppression for almost one hundred years. While the Ainu Culture Law has been widely criticized for its shortcomings, the shift that it represents in Japan's view of the Ainu people is a testament to the importance of the Nibutani decision. In 2007, the "Cultural Landscape along the Sarugawa River resulting from Ainu Tradition and Modern Settlement" was designated an Important Cultural Landscape of Japan. A later action seeking the restoration of Ainu assets held in trust by the Japanese government was dismissed in 2008.

==== Governmental bodies on Ainu affairs ====
There is no single government body to coordinate Ainu affairs. Rather, various advisory boards are set up by the Hokkaido government to advise on specific matters. One such committee operated in the late 1990s, and its work resulted in the Ainu Cultural Promotion Act. This panel was criticized for including no Ainu members.

In 2006, another panel was established, which notably included an Ainu member for the first time. It completed its work in 2008, issuing a major report that included an extensive historical record and called for substantial government policy changes towards the Ainu.

==== Formation of Ainu political party ====
On January 21, 2012, the Ainu Party (アイヌ民族党, Ainu minzoku tō) was founded after a group of Ainu activists in Hokkaidō announced the formation of a political party for the Ainu on October 30, 2011. The Ainu Association of Hokkaidō reported that Kayano Shiro, the son of the former Ainu leader Kayano Shigeru, would head the party. Their aim is to contribute to the realization of a society where the Ainu and Japanese can coexist and possess equal rights in Japan.

==== Official promotion ====
The "2019 Ainu Act" simplified procedures for obtaining various permissions from authorities in regards to the traditional lifestyle of the Ainu and nurtured the identity and cultures of the Ainu without defining the ethnic group by blood lineage.

On July 12, 2020, the National Ainu Museum was opened at the Upopoy park complex in Shiraoi, Hokkaidō. It had originally been scheduled to open on April 24, 2020, prior to the Tokyo Olympic and Paralympic Games scheduled in the same year. The park was planned to be a base for the protection and promotion of Ainu people, culture, and language. The museum promotes the culture and habits of the Ainu people, who are the original inhabitants of Hokkaidō. Upopoy in the Ainu language means "singing in a large group". The National Ainu Museum building has images and videos exhibiting the history and daily life of the Ainu. The Ainu cultural contribution is also recognized by a UNESCO listing, in consequence of a UNESCO decision to list non-physical cultural assets, including songs and dancing.

In July 2023, it was reported that a group of Ainu from Hokkaido was suing the government to reclaim the right of salmon river fishing. This has been outlawed for a century, except for the exemption of a limited number of salmon for ceremonial purposes. The group claimed the Japanese government did not abide by the 2007 United Nations Declaration on the Rights of Indigenous People, which it had signed.

== See also ==
- Ainu-ken
- Ainu Revolution Theory
- Akira Ifukube
- Anti-Japaneseism
- Bibliography of the Ainu
- Bikki Sunazawa
- Burakumin
- Constitution of Japan
- Ethnic issues in Japan
  - Human rights in Japan
  - Racism in Japan
- Ethnocide
- Genocide of indigenous peoples
- Hiram M. Hiller Jr.
- Kankō Ainu
- Matagi
- Mieko Chikappu
- Shizue Ukaji

=== Ainu culture ===
- Ainu flag
- Ainu genre painting
- Ikupasuy
