= Kim-un-kamuy =

Deity

Kim-un-kamuy (キムンカムイ, lit. 'god of the mountains', also called Metotush Kamuy and Nuparikor Kamuy) is the Ainu kamuy (god) of bears and mountains.

== Mythology ==
Bears are prominent in Ainu mythology. They are generally considered benevolent, though there are tales of ararush ('monstrous bears'). A prominent ritual carried out by every village that could manage to do so involved the capture of a live bear cub. This cub would be kept, fed, and well treated for a year. Then a bear ceremony was performed, during which it would be shot to death with arrows. Its flesh was eaten to free its spirit to return to the heavens, and when it reached Kim-un Kamuy's home, it would tell of the humans' piety in gratitude for this service.

An important myth of Kim-un Kamuy explains this ritual: One day, the bear god is told by the crow that his wife has gone down from the heavens to the village of humans and has not returned. He rushes home, takes his child, and goes to the human village, where he is greeted by Kamuy Paseguru, the hunt goddess, who invites him to visit Kamuy Fuchi, goddess of the hearth. While they are speaking, a fox bewitches him; then Kamuy Paseguru knocks him out. He regains consciousness in the branches of a tree, and sees the body of an old bear lying below, and a cub playing nearby. He observes while the humans worship the dead bear, making offerings of wine, millet dumplings, and inau (sacred rods). They subsequently take the bear's meat, and the cub, back to their village, where they present him with further offerings. He finds his wife there as well, sitting near the hearth, and they spend several days feasting with Kamuy Huchi before returning to their home, where they give a feast for the other kamuy. Their young cub returns a year later with further gifts of wine and inau, leading to another feast.

== See also ==
- Ainu religion
