= Ainu religion =

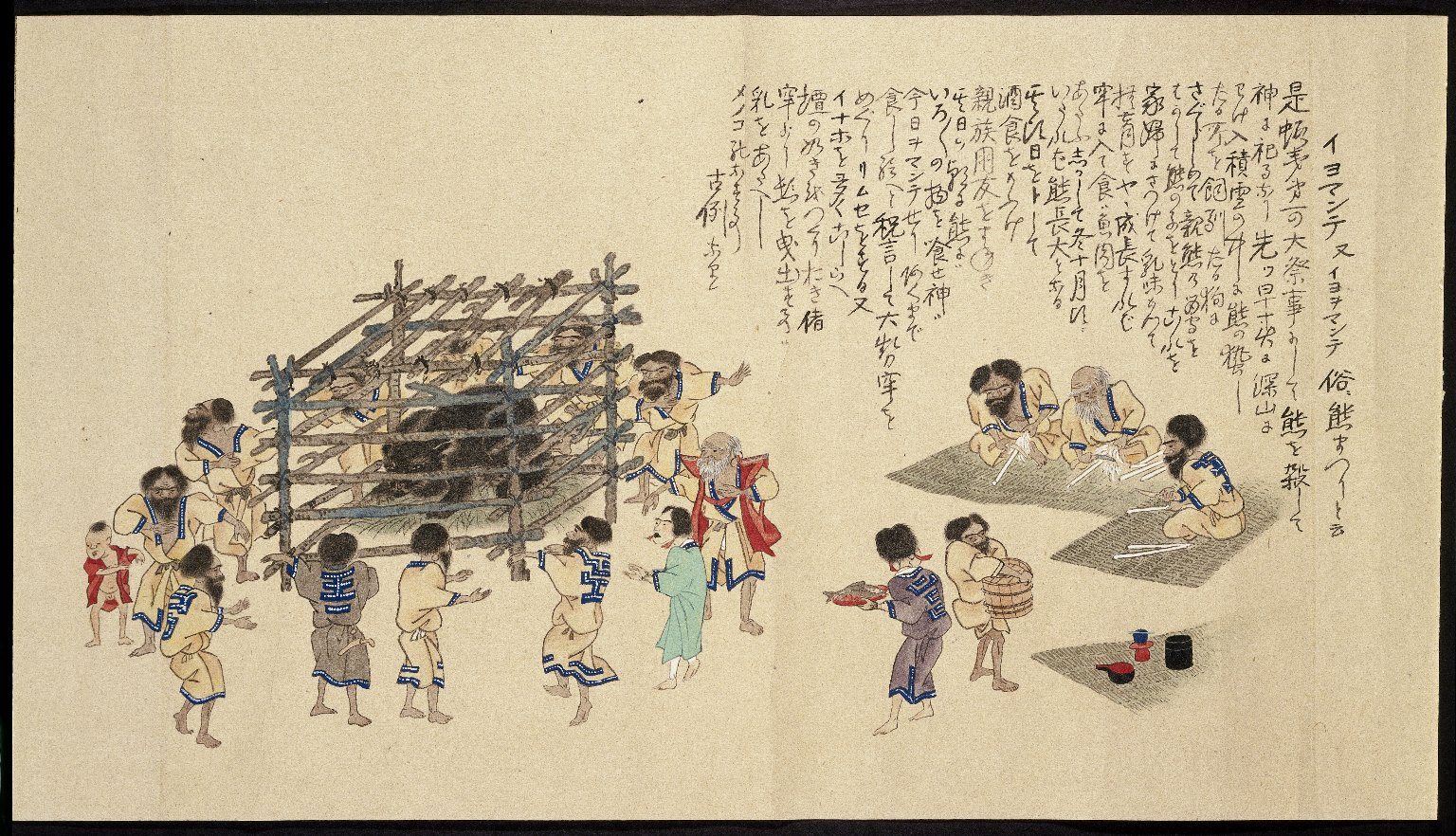
Artistic depiction of Ainu preparing for an iyomante ritual, c. 1840

Ainu religion consists of the spiritual beliefs, ritual practices, and mythical stories of the Ainu people. It is broadly animist in nature, with special reverence for animal sacrifice traditionally. Today only a small minority of Ainu people practice traditional Ainu religion, with the majority following Buddhism.

== Ainu creation myth ==
There is not a singular creation myth for the Ainu but various traditional accounts of creation. These stories share common characteristics with Japanese creation myths and earth diver creation stories commonly found in Central Asian and Native American cultures. The core of the creation myths involve Kotan-kar-kamuy creating the world, and then various other kamuy creating humans and providing them with the necessities to live.

== Animism and kamuy ==
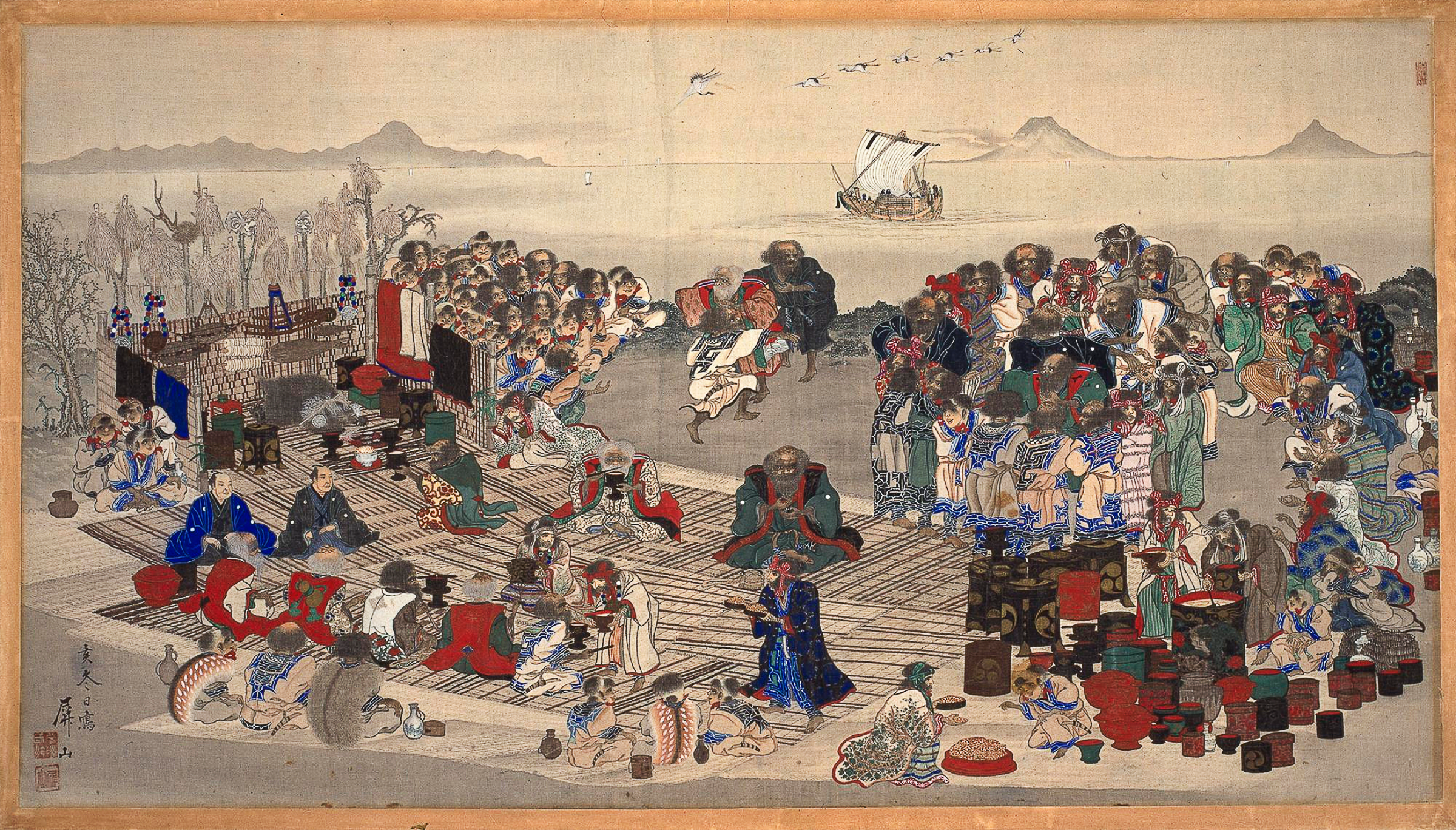
Painting of the Ainu iyomante, or bear spirit sending ceremony, in Hokkaido (1875)

The Ainu are traditionally animists, believing that everything in nature has a kamuy (spirit or god) on the inside. The most important include:

- Kamuy-huci, kamuy of the hearth
- Kim-un-kamuy, kamuy of bears and mountains
- Rep-un-kamuy, kamuy of the sea, fishing, and marine animals
- Kotan-kar-kamuy, regarded as the creator of the world in the Ainu religion
- Ae-oyna-kamuy, regarded as a cultural hero and the kamuy who taught the Ainu weaving, carving, fishing, hunting, gathering, architecture, medicine, and religious ritual.

Ainu clans would establish agreements with local kamuy to allow the Ainu to use the land to support them and their communities.

Ainu craftsmen, and the Ainu as a whole, traditionally believed that "anything made with deep sincerity was imbued with spirit and also became a [kamuy]". They also held the belief that ancestors and the power of the family could be invoked through certain patterns in art to protect them from malignant influences.

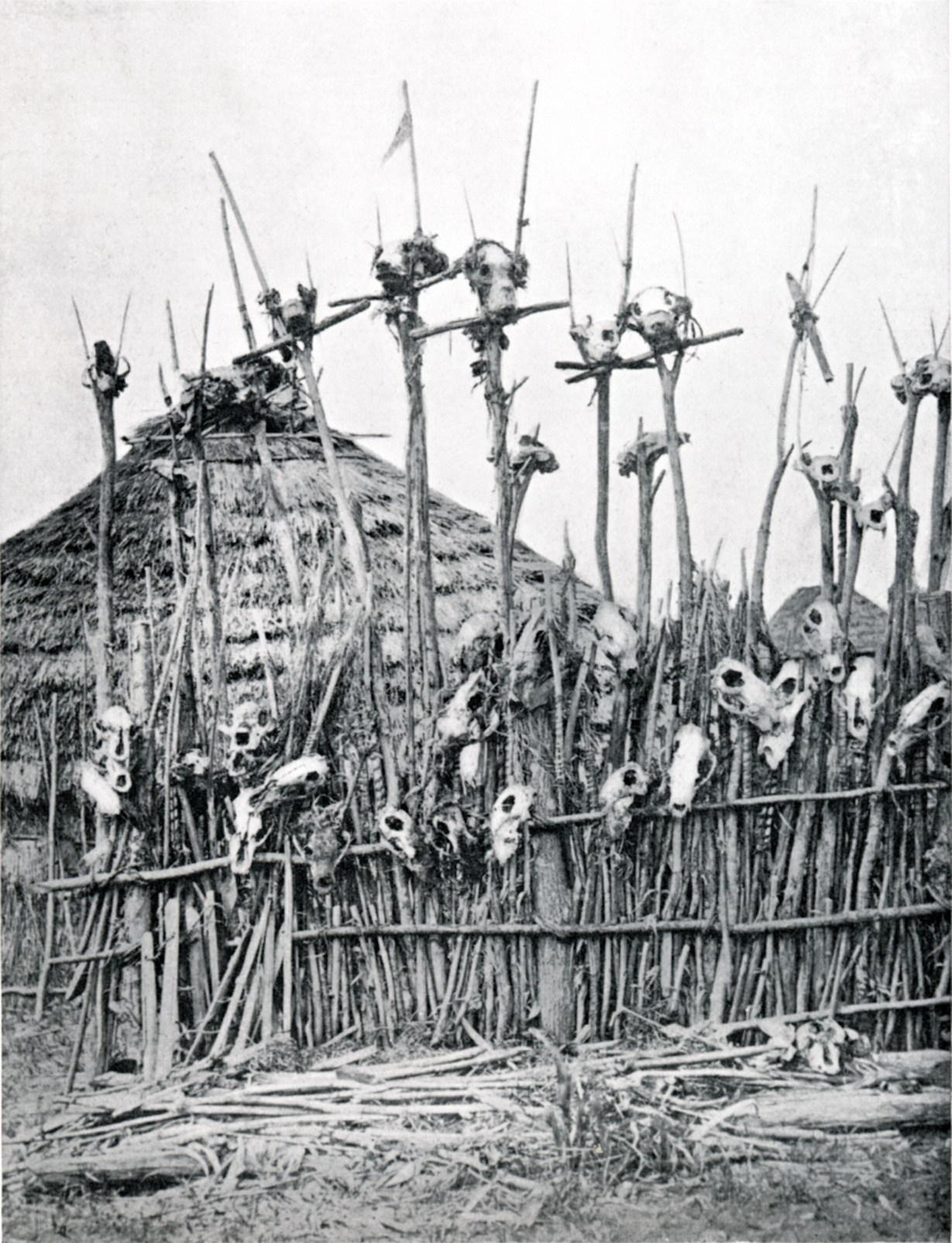
Bear skulls mounted on the top of nusa in an Ainu village during the late Meiji period

The Ainu people give thanks to the gods before eating and pray to Kamuy-huci in times of sickness. Kamuy-huci is also considered to be the Ainu people's most important female deity, thus cooking, which is associated closely with fire and the hearth, is a major symbol used in healing rites that occur right beside the hearth through shamans. Traditional Ainu belief holds that their spirits are immortal and that their spirits will be rewarded hereafter by ascending to kamuy mosir (Land of the Gods).

The Ainu are part of a larger collective of indigenous people who practice "arctolatry", or bear worship. The Ainu believe that the bear holds particular importance as Kim-un Kamuy's chosen method of delivering the gift of the bear's hide and meat to humans.

John Batchelor reported that the Ainu view the world as being a spherical ocean on which many islands float, a view based on the fact that the sun rises in the east and sets in the west. He wrote that they believe the world rests on the back of a large fish, which, when it moves, causes earthquakes.

Another religious-based practice was the Kamuy Puyara or Sacred Windows. Ainu homes, called chise, contained a special window through which sacred offerings were made. Excavations of Pre-Modern Ainu settlements (13th–17th century) show burials and house orientations aligned with spiritual beliefs.

=== Kamuy ===
Alongside kamuy that can be helpful and benevolent, there are kamuy associated with disasters and misfortune called wen-kamuy (evil kamuy).

Additional kamuy include:

- Cikap-kamuy, kamuy of owls and land
- Apasam Kamuy, kamuy of thresholds
- Hasinaw-uk-kamuy, kamuy of the hunt
- Kanda-koro-kamuy, kamuy of the sky
- Kina-sut-kamuy, kamuy of snakes
- Kunnecup-kamuy, kamuy of the moon
- Mosir-kara-kamuy, kamuy who created the earth
- Nusa-kor-kamuy, kamuy of community and the deceased
- Pawci-kamuy, kamuy of insanity
- Shiramba Kamuy, kamuy of wood, grain, and vegetation
- Shinda, kamuy of fertility
- Tokapcup-kamuy, kamuy of the sun
- Wakka-us-kamuy, kamuy of fresh water
- Yushkep Kamuy, kamuy of spiders

=== Legendary creature ===
- Huri

== Shamanism ==
While Ainu religion has no priests by profession, it does include a variety of shamanistic practices, often overseen by the village chief who performs whatever religious ceremonies are necessary. Ceremonies mainly consist of making libations of sake, saying prayers, and offering willow sticks with wooden shavings attached to them. These sticks are called inau (singular) and nusa (plural).

Shamanistic practices are observed among the Ainu, and can be broadly divided into Sakhalin-type and Hokkaido-type. The Sakhalin-type includes ritual physical exertion to induce an ecstatic state, known as imu. Whereas in the Hokkaido-type, ecstatic states are not induced through ritual physical exertion. After World War II in Hokkaido, many of the artefacts and processes to induce an ecstatic state for shamanistic practices were from Japanese and Buddhist culture, such as the use of Japanese drums and Buddhist sutras and prayer beads.

In the 20th century imu was researched as a psychological condition, with Uchimura Yushi recording 110 cases of imu in his field work conducted in the 1930s. Later researchers have labelled imu as a "culture-bound syndrome", with research by Nozuma Suwa et al. in 1958 finding only four cases. As with the broad division of shamanistic practices, the symptoms and stimulus of imu were differentiated between Sakhalin-type and Hokkaido-type.

== Rituals ==
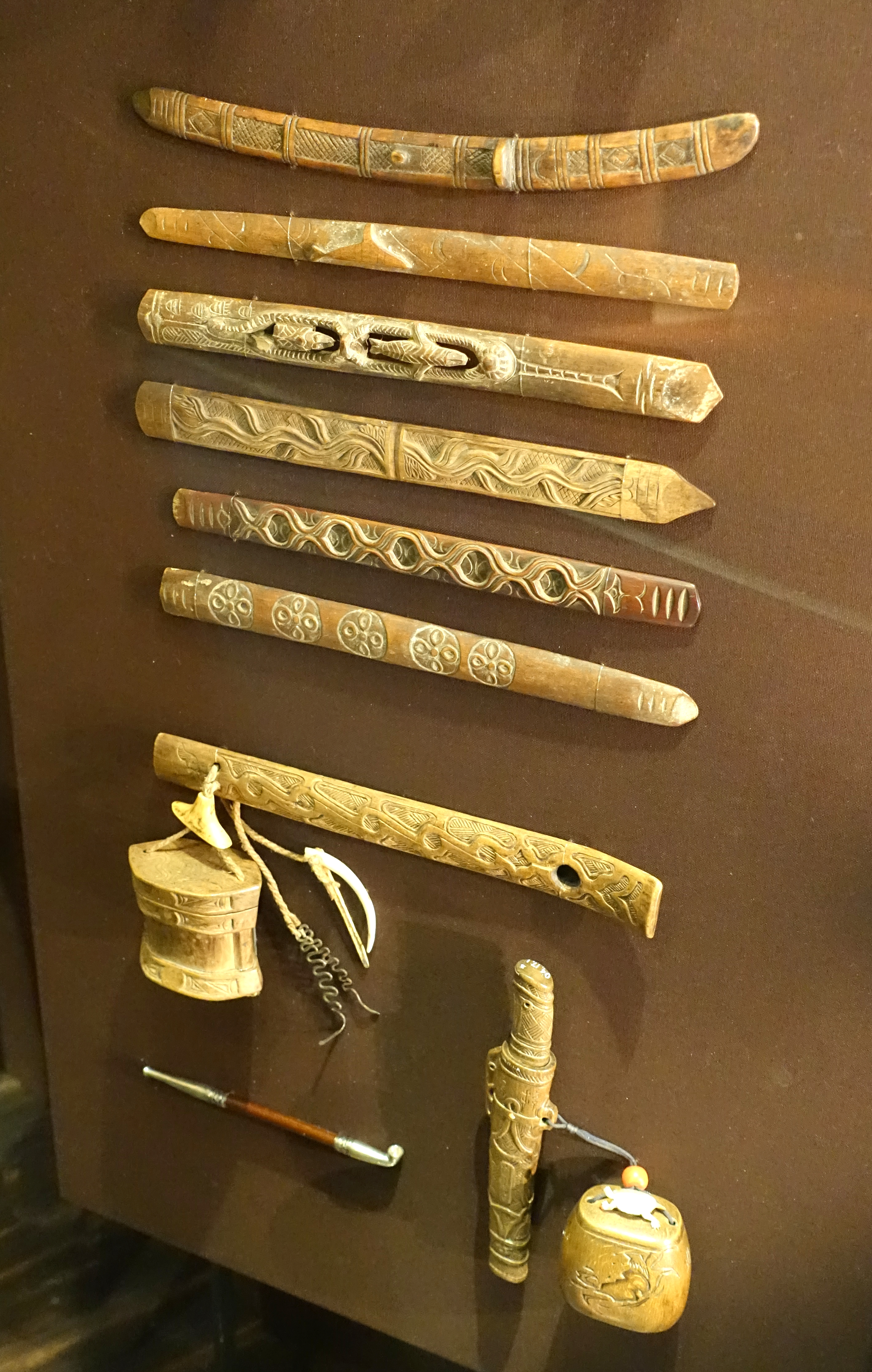
A collection of ikupasuy held at the Museum of Ethnography, Sweden

The Ainu religion consists of a pantheistic animist structure in which the world is founded on interactions between humans and kamuy. Within all living beings, natural forces, and objects, there is a ramat (sacred life force) that is an extension of a greater kamuy. Kamuy are gods or spirits that choose to visit the human world in temporary physical forms, both animate and inanimate, within the human world. Once the physical vessel dies or breaks, the ramat returns to the kamuy and leaves its physical form behind as a gift to humans. If the humans treated the vessel and kamuy with respect and gratitude, then the kamuy would return out of delight for the human world. Due to this interaction, the Ainu lived with deep reverence for nature and all objects and phenomena in the hopes that the kamuy would return. The Ainu believed that the kamuy granted humans objects, skills, and knowledge to use tools, and thus deserve respect and worship.

Daily practices included the moderation of hunting, gathering, and harvesting to not disturb the kamuy. Often, the Ainu would make offerings of an inau (sacred shaved stick), which usually consisted of whittled willow tree wood with decorative shavings still attached, alongside alcoholic drinks to the kamuy. They also built sacred altars called nusa (a fence-like row of taller Inau decorated with bear skulls), separated from the main house and raised storehouses and often observed outdoor rituals.

Other rituals were performed for things such as food and illness. The Ainu had a ritual to welcome the salmon and their seasonal harvest (asir-cep-nomi), praying for a big catch, and another to thank the salmon at the end of the season. There was also a ritual for warding off kamuy that would bring epidemics, using strong-smelling herbs placed in doorways, windows, and gardens to turn away epidemic kamuy. Similarly to many religions, the Ainu also gave prayers and offerings to their ancestors in the spirit world or afterlife. They would also pray to the fire kamuy to deliver their offerings of broken snacks and fruit, as well as tobacco.

=== Libation rituals ===
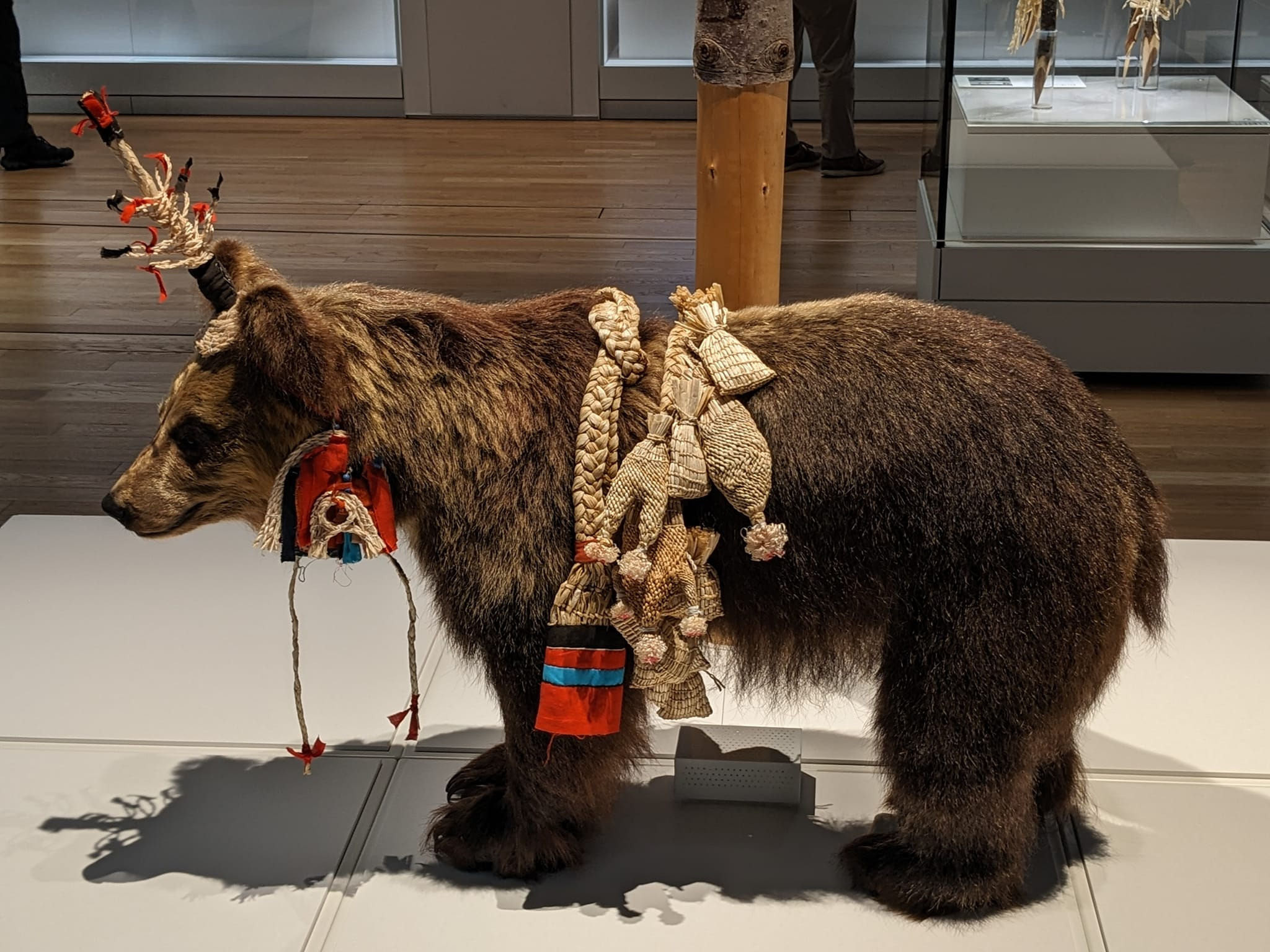
Reconstruction of the iomante of the Sakhalin Ainu (exhibit at Upopoy, the National Ainu Museum

The use of wine in rituals increased over time with the increase in trade between Ainu and Japanese, especially the import of sake. In offerings involving libations, the Ainu would make the offerings using a ikupasuy, special ceremonial sticks featuring intricately carved patterns and symbols. These were one of the few instances where the Ainu believed it to be alright to include representations of animals. The tip of the ikupasuy would be dipped in the beer or wine, and then the libation would be dropped from the ikupasuy onto venerated objects.

=== Iyomante ===
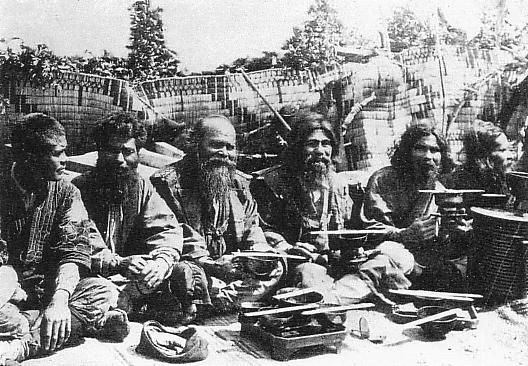
Ainu men presenting offerings during an iyomante, c. 1930

The Ainu observed a ritual that would return kamuy, a divine or spiritual being in Ainu mythology, to the spiritual realm through the ritual killing of animals, such as owls, foxes, and bears. This kamuy sending ritual was called Iyomante.

The most famous Iyomante are those for sending back bears which dates back to 11 CE. This ritual took place over several years, beginning with the capture of a bear cub during hibernation, it was then raised in the village as a child. Women would care for the cubs as if they were their children, sometimes even nursing them if needed. Once the bears reached maturity, they would be ritually killed. People from neighbouring villages were invited to help celebrate this ritual, in which men in the village then take shots at the cub with blunted ceremonial arrows, until the time came for it to be slaughtered. However, the "bear kamuy" is merely considered to have returned to its god-world (kamuy mosir), Afterwards, they would eat the meat. Since they treated the bear well in life, the Ainu believed that in death, the spirit of the bear would ensure the well-being of its adoptive community.

In 1955, this ritual was outlawed as animal cruelty. In 2007, it became exempt due to its cultural significance to the Ainu. The ritual has since been modified; it is now an annual festival. The festival begins at sundown with a torch parade. A play is then performed, and this is followed by music and dancing.

=== Dancing in rituals ===
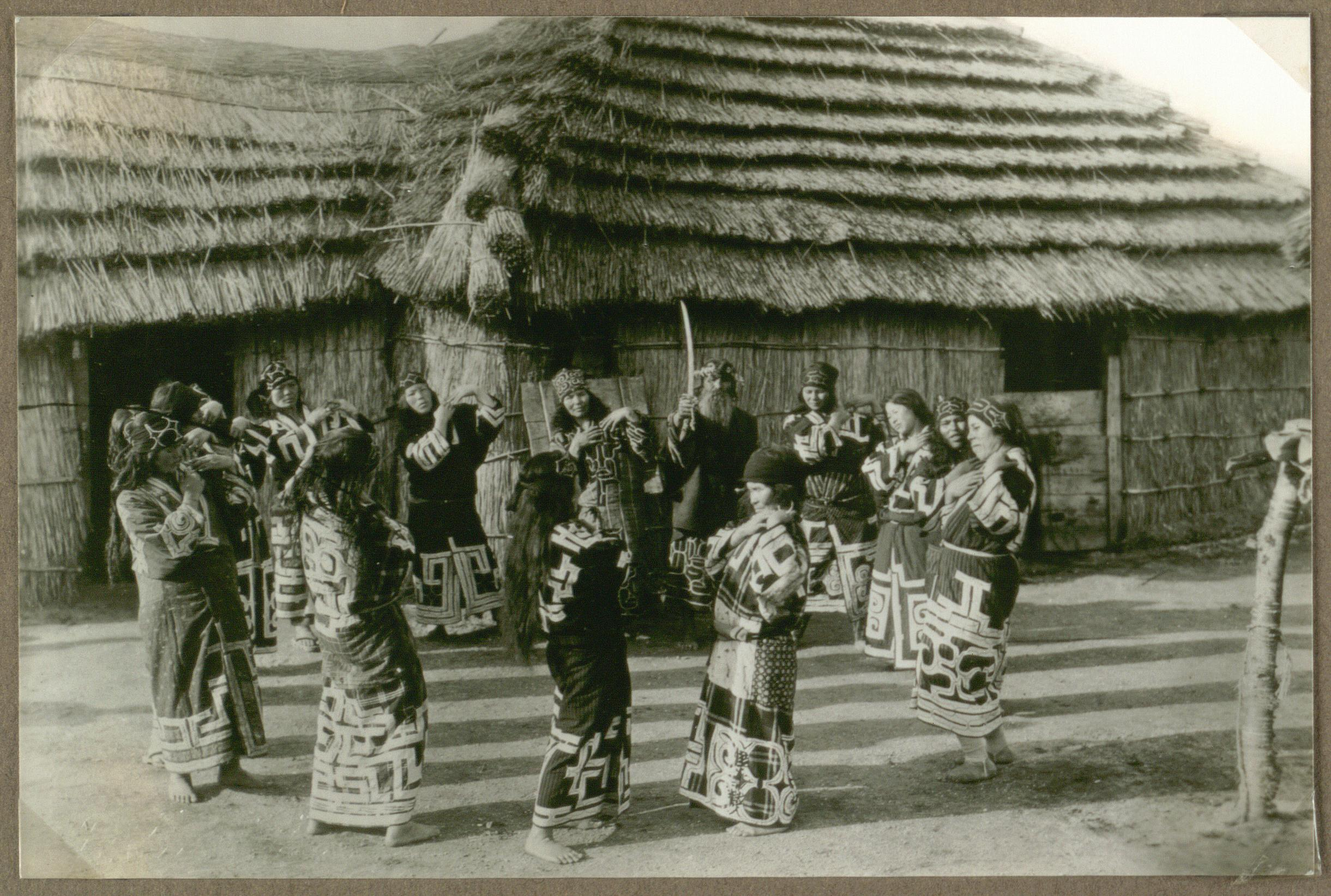
Ainu performing a dance in commemoration of deceased individuals

Traditional dances are performed at ceremonies and banquets. Dancing is a part of the newly organised cultural festivals, and it is even done privately in daily life. Ainu traditional dances often involve large circles of dancers, and sometimes there are onlookers that sing without musical instruments. In rituals, these dances are intimate; they involve the calls and movements of animals and/or insects. Some, like the sword and bow dances, are rituals that were used to worship and give thanks for nature. This was to thank deities that they believed were in their surroundings. There was also a dance in Iomante that mimicked the movements of a living bear. However, some dances are improvised and meant just for entertainment. Overall, Ainu traditional dancing reinforced their connection to nature and the religious world and provided a link to other Arctic cultures.

== Funerary practices ==
When a person dies, their soul is thought to travel through the hearth of Kamuy-huci, the goddess of fire, to the afterlife. Burial customs included dressing the deceased in ceremonial clothing and surrounding them with their treasured possessions, which were intentionally broken to release their spirits. Funerals also included prayers and offerings to the fire kamuy, as well as verse laments expressing wishes for a smooth journey to the next world. Sometimes a burial would be followed by burning the residence of the dead. In the event of an unnatural death, there would be a speech raging against the gods. The graves were often isolated and were marked by carved poles called "kuwa." These practices reflect the Ainu's deep spiritual beliefs and their connection to nature and the divine.

In the afterlife, recognised ancestral spirits moved through and influenced the world, though neglected spirits would return to the living world and cause misfortune. Prosperity of family in the afterlife would depend on prayers and offerings left by living descendants; this often led to Ainu parents teaching their children to look after them in the afterlife.

The "okuriba" or sacred site is a sacred ritual platform used in Ainu funerary customs. It was typically a raised platform where offerings were placed. The Ainu people believed that these offerings helped the deceased transition to the Spirit World.

=== Graves ===
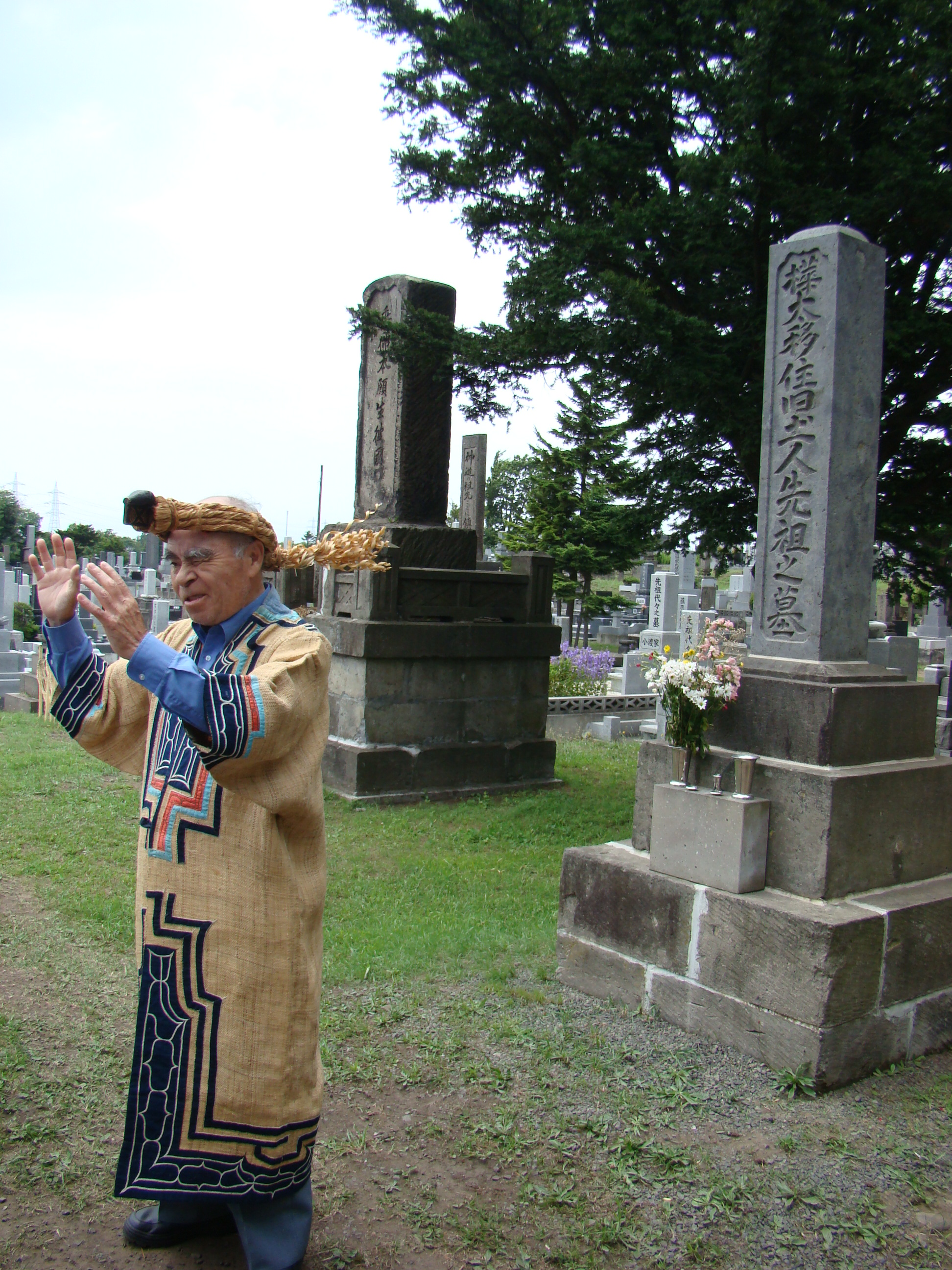
Takayoshi Ogawa, an Ainu rights activist giving a talk in front of a memorial to Ainu killed in Sakhalin

Archaeological excavations have revealed that Ainu graves are typically oval or rectangular, with the deceased primarily buried in an extended dorsal position, though some were interred in a crouched posture. Offerings placed around the head provide insight into its orientation, based on the distribution of burial accessories, even when skeletal remains are absent. Over 1,000 burials from the Pre-Ainu Period have been uncovered and catalogued by Utagawa, with about 400 featuring precisely documented orientations. Earlier excavation reports predominantly referenced magnetic north, according to current Hokkaido data. At the Tohohata Burial site in Shin-Hidaka Town, 75 burials have been excavated, and with only one exception, all exhibited a southeast orientation near the Winter Solstice sunrise point. In contrast, at the Motomonbetsu site in Monbetsu Town, northeastern Hokkaido, burial orientations are more varied, with east, southeast, north, and northwest alignments being present. This variation suggests regional differences in burial orientation mirroring patterns seen in house alignments.

== Oral traditions ==
The Ainu have a variety of oral traditions that play a part in their religious traditions. One tradition is that of the yukar, mythical sagas that are performed and sung detailing histories of kamuy and Ainu heroes. Yukar were used and invoked in ceremonies to communicate with kamuy.

== Contemporary religious identity ==
As part of the colonisation of Hokkaido many Ainu religious practices were banned as part of forced assimilation. Ainu assimilated into mainstream Japanese society have adopted Buddhism and Shintō; some northern Ainu were converted as members of the Russian Orthodox Church. Regarding Ainu communities in Shikotan and other areas that fall within the Russian sphere of cultural influence, there have been a few churches constructed, and some Ainu are reported to have adopted the Christian faith. There have also been reports that the Russian Orthodox Church has performed some missionary projects in the Sakhalin Ainu community. However, there are only reports of a few conversions to Christianity. Converts have been scorned as "Nutsa Ainu" (Russian Ainu) by other members of the Ainu community. Reports indicate that many Ainu have kept their faith in their traditional deities.

According to the 2008 Hokkaido Ainu People's Lives Survey Report, among the Hokkaido Ainu, 46.2% reported their religion as Buddhism, 2.9% as traditional Ainu beliefs, 2.4% as Shinto, and 34.5% as no religion.

According to a 2012 survey conducted by Hokkaido University, a high percentage of Ainu are members of their household family religion, which is Buddhism (especially Nichiren Shōshū Buddhism). However, it is noted that, similar to the Japanese religious consciousness, there is not a strong feeling of identification with a particular religion, with Buddhist and traditional beliefs both being part of their daily lives.
