= Nusa-kor-kamuy =

Ainu god

- Community kamuy, associated with ancestor worship
- Other names: Kotan-koresu
- Associated deities: Kina-sut-kamuy

Genealogy
- Siblings: Hash-Inau-uk Kamuy; Kamuy-huci; Kina-sut-kamuy

Nusa-kor-kamuy (ヌサ・コﾙ・カムイ) is an Ainu kamuy (god). Called the community-founding kamuy, he represents the dead and serves as a messenger to the other kamuy. He is referred to as Kotan-koresu in prayers.

== Mythology and worship ==
Nusa-kor-kamuy is the originator of nusa or inau, sacred carved wands that represent the kamuy in Ainu ritual. He is responsible for maintaining the row of inau arranged outside of a traditional Ainu dwelling, and he carries the inau and other offerings to the gods, along with humans' messages of reverence. He is called upon to assist in rituals, ensuring that the respect behind them is properly conveyed to the kamuy. He is assisted in his tasks by Yushkep Kamuy, the spider goddess.

Nusa-kor-kamuy is closely associated with the snake god, Kina-sut-kamuy. Some consider the two to be brothers, while others consider them to be the same entity. Nusa-kor-kamuy is also sometimes presented as a female deity. He is sometimes considered to be the sibling of Kamuy-huci and Hash-Inau-uk Kamuy.

Elders are buried near his nusa (offering collections) with the place for offerings to the dead being located nearby. Offerings to Nusa-kor-kamuy are carried out through the west door, the same door offerings to the dead are carried through. Other kamuy's offerings are carried through the east door.

== See also ==
- Ainu religion

== Bibliography ==
- Munro, Neil Gordon. Ainu Creed and Cult. New York: Columbia University Press, 1962.
