= Kamuy =

Spiritual or divine beings in Ainu mythology

A kamuy (Ainu: カムィ; Japanese: カムイ, romanized: kamui) is a spiritual or divine being in Ainu mythology, a term denoting a supernatural entity composed of or possessing spiritual energy.

The Ainu people have many myths about the kamuy, passed down through oral traditions and rituals. The stories of the kamuy were portrayed in chants and performances, which were often performed during sacred rituals.

== Concept ==
In concept, kamuy are similar to the Japanese kami but this translation misses some of the nuances of the term (the missionary John Batchelor assumed that the Japanese term was of Ainu origin).

The usage of the term is very extensive and contextual among the Ainu, and can refer to something regarded as especially positive as well as something regarded as especially strong. Kamuy can refer to spiritual beings, including animals, plants, the weather, and even human tools. Guardian angels are called Ituren-Kamui.

Kamuy are numerous; some are delineated and named, such as Kamuy-huci, the hearth goddess, while others are not. Kamuy often have very specific associations, for instance, there is a kamuy of the undertow. Batchelor compares the word with the Greek term daimon.

Personified deities of Ainu mythology often have the term kamuy applied as part of their names.

== Folklore ==
=== Creation myth ===
The Ainu legend goes that at the beginning of the world, there was only water and earth mixed together in a sludge. Nothing existed except for the thunder demons in the clouds and the first self created kamuy. The first kamuy then sent down a bird spirit, moshiri-kor-kamuy, to make the world habitable. The water wagtail bird saw the swampy state of the earth and flew over the waters, and pounded down the earth with its feet and tail. After much work, areas of dry land appeared, seeming to float above the waters that surrounded them. Thus, the Ainu refer to the world as moshiri, meaning "floating earth". The wagtail is also a revered bird due to this legend.

=== Ape-Kamuy ===
Once the earth was formed, the first kamuy, otherwise known as kanto-kor-kamuy, the heavenly spirit, sent other kamuy to the earth. Of these kamuy was ape-kamuy (see also kamuy huchi, ape huchi), the fire spirit. Ape-kamuy was the most important spirit, ruling over nusa-kor-kamuy (ceremonial altar spirit), ram-nusa-kor-kamuy (low ceremonial altar spirit), hasinaw-kor-kamuy (hunting spirit), and wakka-us-kamuy (water spirit). As the most important kamuy, ape-kamuy's permission/assistance is needed for prayers and ceremonies. She is the connection between humans and the other spirits and deities, and gives the prayers of the people to the proper spirits.

== Oral history ==
The Ainu had no writing system of their own, and much of Ainu mythology was passed down as oral history in the form of kamuy yukar (deity epics), long verses traditionally recounted by singers at a gathering. The kamuy yukar was seen as a significant form of communication between the kamuy and the humans, along with prayers and rituals. Each kamuy yukar recounts a deity's or hero's adventures, usually in the first person, and some of them are of great length, containing as many as 7,000 verses. In general, however, they are considered to be shorter in length in comparison to other types of oral genres in the Ainu culture. Some yukar contradict each other, assigning the same events to different deities or heroes; this is primarily a result of the Ainu culture's organization into small, relatively isolated groups. Records of these poems began to be kept only in the late 19th century, by Western missionaries and Japanese ethnographers; however, the Ainu tradition of memorizing the yukar preserved many.

Though kamuy yukar is considered to be one of the oldest genres of Ainu oral performance, anthropologist Emiko Ohnuki-Tierney supposed that there are more than 20 types of genres. Originally, it seems kamuy yukar was performed solely for religious purposes by the women who took on the role of shamans. The shamans became possessed and recanted the chants, possibly explaining why kamuy yukar is performed with a first-person narrative. As time passed, kamuy yukar became less of a sacred ritual, serving as entertainment and as a way to pass down traditions and cultural stories. Today, the kamuy yukar is no longer performed in the Horobetsu tradition. The only hints of the traditional chants are in written records, including those of Yukie Chiri (1903-1922), a Horobetsu Ainu woman who wrote fragments of traditional chants that her grandmother performed. She compiled the historical chants from her aunt Imekanu in a book titled Ainu shin'yoshu.

== "Sending-back" rituals ==
The Ainu have rituals in which they "send back" the kamuy to the heavens with gifts. There are various rituals of this type, including the iomante, the bear ceremony. The rituals center around the idea of releasing the kamuy from their disguises, their hayopke, that they have put on to visit the human world in order to receive gifts from the humans. The kamuy in their hayopke choose the hunter that will hunt them, giving them the flesh of the animal in turn. Once the hayopke is broken, the kamuy are free to return to their world with the gifts from the humans.

=== Iomante ===
The iomante (also spelled iyomante) is a ritual in which the people "send-off" the guest, the bear spirit, back to its home in the heavens. A bear is raised by the ritual master's wife from a cub. When it is time for the ritual, the men create prayer sticks (inau) for the altar (nusa-san), ceremonial arrows, liquor, and gifts for the spirit in order to prepare for the ritual. Prayers are then offered to ape-kamuy, and dances, songs, and yukar are performed.

The main part of the ritual is performed the next day, taking place at a ritual space by the altar outside. Prayers are offered to various kamuy, and then the bear is taken out of its cage with a rope around its neck. There is dancing and singing around the bear, and the bear is given food and a prayer. The men shoot the ceremonial decorated arrows at the bear, and the ritual master shoots the fatal arrow as the women cry for the bear. The bear is strangled with sticks and then taken to the altar where the people give gifts to the dead bear and pray to the kamuy again. The bear is dismembered, and the head brought inside. There is a feast with the bear's boiled flesh, with performances of yukar, dances, and songs.

On the third and final day of the ritual, the bear's head is skinned and decorated with inau and gifts. It is then put on a y-shaped stick and turned to face the mountains in the east. This part of the ritual is to send the bear off to the mountains. After another feast, the skull is turned back towards the village to symbolize the kamuy's return to its world.

In Ainu mythology, the kamuy are believed to return home after the ritual and find their houses filled with gifts from the humans. More gifts mean more prestige and wealth in the kamuy's society, and the kamuy will gather his friends and tell them of the generosity of the humans, making the other kamuy wish to go to the human world themselves. In this way, the humans express their gratitude for the kamuy, and the kamuy will continue to bring them prosperity.

== Some notable kamuy ==
- Ae-oina Kamuy, a culture hero who taught humans the domesticated and sacred arts
- Apasam Kamuy, kamuy of the threshold
- Cikap-kamuy/Kotan-kor-kamuy, the god of owls and the land
- Cironnup Kamuy, god of foxes
- Hasinaw-uk-kamuy, goddess of the hunt
- Hoyau kamui, dragon god
- Kamuy-huci, goddess of the hearth
- Kandakoro Kamuy, the prime originator, the god of the sky
- Kanna Kamuy, kamuy of thunder and lightning
- Kenas-unarpe, a blood-drinking monster who preys upon hunters
- Kim-un-kamuy, the god of mountains and bears
- Kina-sut-kamuy, the god of snakes
- Kotan-kar-kamuy, god of creation
- Kunnecup-kamuy, the god of the moon
- Mosirkara Kamuy, creator of the earth
- Nusa-kor-kamuy, messenger to the gods and representative of the dead
- Pauchi Kamuy, an evil spirit responsible for insanity
- Repun Kamuy, the killer whale, the god of the sea
- Shiramba Kamuy, the god of wood, grains, and vegetation
- Tokapcup-kamuy, goddess of the sun
- Waka-ush Kamuy, goddess of fresh water
- Yushkep Kamuy, the spider goddess
- Sarorun Kamuy, the god of the marshes. The personification of the red-crowned crane (Grus japonensis), which lives in the wetland habitats of east Hokkaido and southern Sakhalin. Other species of resident and migratory birds are also given the name Kamuy.

== In names ==
Kamuy can be found in proper names, especially place names in Hokkaido, such as Kamuikotan (神居古潭; literally "Village of Kamuy") or Cape Kamui (神威岬, Kamui-misaki). Kamui (神威) is also a male proper name, and the spelling is the same as the word shin'i that means "divine power".

== Star naming ==
A star located in the northern constellation of Corona Borealis (The Northern Crown) is named after it. See HD 145457.

== See also ==
- Kami
- Koshintō
- Shinto
