= Wakka-us-kamuy =

Ainu kamuy (goddess) of fresh water

Wakka-us Kamuy (Ainu ワッカウシカムイ) is the Ainu kamuy (goddess) of fresh water. She is also known as Petorush Mat (Watering-place Woman).

== Depiction ==
Wakka-us Kamuy is portrayed as a long-haired woman who is a skilled dancer and singer.

== Mythology ==
In Ainu mythology, Wakka-us Kamuy is a benevolent goddess who oversees the river valleys around which Ainu communities centered and is responsible for all fresh water. She is sympathetic to humanity, and is sometimes petitioned to intercede with other kamuy on their behalf.

One such myth tells how Wakka-us Kamuy ended a famine that had broken out. Petitioned by Okikurmi, the culture hero and sorcerer, she invites the kamuy of the rapids, the kamuy of fish, the kamuy of game, the goddess of the hunt Hasinaw-uk Kamuy, and the overseer of the land Kotan-kor Kamuy to a feast. She dances and sings, entertaining them, and in the course of the evening brings up the humans' plight. The fish kamuy informs her that the humans were not killing fish in the proper ritual manner, so he has locked the salmon in his storehouse; the game kamuy says the same of the deer. Kotan-kor Kamuy is angry as well, because the humans have not made offerings to him. Wakka-us Kamuy and the sympathetic Hasinaw-uk Kamuy, while continuing to dance, send their souls to the storehouses and let the deer and salmon loose; in order to avoid making a scene, the other kamuy had no choice but to continue the feast. Afterward, Wakka-us Kamuy sends a dream to Okikurmi, telling him what had happened and why, and warning him to see that the rituals were carried out in proper fashion.

== See also ==
- Ainu religion
