= Shiramba Kamuy =

Ainu god

Shiramba Kamuy is the Ainu kamuy (god) of wood, grains, and other forms of vegetation. He is therefore also the kamuy of many household tools, which contain wood. Shiramba Kamuy's ramat (soul) is thought to be particularly strong in oak trees. As he provides timber, he is considered to be the protector and owner of all houses. He is referred to as "The Upholder of the World". He also shares the title of "Owner of the World" with Kamuy-huci.

He is sometimes portrayed as the brother of Hash-inau-uk Kamuy, the goddess of the hunt.

== See also ==
- Ainu religion

== Bibliography ==
- Munro, Neil Gordon. Ainu Creed and Cult. New York: Columbia University Press, 1962.
