= Tokapcup-kamuy =

Ainu people's solar goddess

Tokapcup-kamuy (Ainu: トカㇷ゚チュㇷ゚カムイ, day-illuminating god) is the solar goddess of the Ainu people. Her husband is the moon god Kunnecup-kamuy. Kotan-kar-kamuy was given the task of illuminating the human world, as well raising the culture hero Aynurakkur.

== See also ==
- Ainu religion
- Amaterasu, her Japanese counterpart
- List of solar deities
