= Kotan-kar-kamuy =

Deity of the Ainu people

Kotan-kar-kamuy (コタンカㇻカムイ, lit. 'village-making-deity') is the creator deity of the Ainu people. He should not be confused with god of the land Kotan-kor-kamuy, or the god of the sky Kandakoro Kamuy.

According to missionary John Batchelor, all kamuy are intermediaries responsible to Kotan-kar-kamuy in the Ainu religion, who is regarded as the almighty and eternal ruler of the universe. This led to assumptions that the Ainu faith had originally been monotheistic. Although he stands on top of the hierarchy of gods in Ainu mythology he is only rarely worshipped. Therefore, Norbert Richard Adami criticises the monotheism theory, and holds that Batchelor's views leading into this direction resulted from a straitened and sometimes misinterpreted mode of perception based on his faith, through which they would lose in value.

One etiological myth explains the spawning of two bad deities and two good, when Kotan-kar-kamuy tried to invent fire making to make a gift of it to mankind. When he first tried using a poplar (Populus suaveolens, Ainu: yai-ni) (Note: The Ainu name means "just ordinary tree"; the Japanese name doro no ki means "mud tree".) the attempt failed and the poplar "pestle" (fire drill) became kenas-unarpe (the evil "marsh aunt") while the "mortar" base became mosir-sinnaysam ("monster of the land"). Then he switched to using an elm (Ulmus davidiana var. japonica, Ainu: cikisani) (Note: Japanese name of this elm tree is harunire.), and was successful. From the white shavings appeared the huntress goddess Hasinaw-uk-kamuy, and from the black shavings appeared the Mountain God (the bear, or kimun).

== See also ==
- Ainu religion
