= Iyomante =

iyomante
- Origin: Japan
- Genres: Japanese pop, alternative rock, folk rock
- Years active: 2023–present
- Members: Kazunori Kawamura; Gakuya Takahashi
- Website: https://iyomante.myshopify.com/

iyomante (Japanese: イヨマンテ) is a Japanese musical duo formed in 2023, consisting of Kazunori Kawamura and Gakuya Takahashi. The duo produces music rooted in Japanese pop and rock. Their 2026 single "Limbo", which incorporated influences from the traditional music of Brittany, France, was featured in the French regional newspaper Le Télégramme.

== History ==
=== Formation and early releases (2023–2024) ===
iyomante was formed in December 2023 by Kazunori Kawamura and Gakuya Takahashi. The two musicians had known each other since high school, where they were in different year groups. After graduating, they reunited while independently looking for musicians with whom to form a band.

On 31 December 2023, the duo released "What Tomorrow Holds" (あしたのハナシ). This was followed by "Alaska" (アラスカ), released on 31 October 2024.

=== Debut album (2025) ===
On 31 July 2025, iyomante released their debut studio album, What Tomorrow Holds. The album includes tracks such as "What Tomorrow Holds", "Alaska", "Enora", "Home, After All" and "Que Sera Sera".

On 29 December 2025, the duo released Komorebi / Nostalgia, a two-track release containing the songs "Komorebi" and "Nostalgia".

=== Breton musical influences and "Limbo" (2026) ===
On 30 April 2026, iyomante released the single "Limbo" (リンボ).

The development of the song was influenced by Kawamura's travels in Brittany, a region in northwestern France. During his visit, he encountered local musical traditions, including the sounds of the bagpipes and the bombard, a traditional Breton double-reed instrument.

According to an interview published in Le Télégramme, "Limbo" was originally written by Takahashi as a composition with a darker atmosphere. Kawamura subsequently reworked its arrangement after his experience in Brittany, incorporating elements inspired by Celtic music. The resulting version adopted a brighter musical character.

On 21 October 2026, Le Télégramme published an article about the duo and the influence of Breton musical traditions on their work. Written by journalist Julien Joly, the article discussed Kawamura's experiences in Brittany and the development of "Limbo".

== Musical style and influences ==
iyomante's music draws primarily from Japanese pop, rock and alternative rock.

According to the duo's official Spotify biography, their influences include Japanese musicians Tamio Okuda and the pillows, as well as British rock bands Oasis and Blur. Their musical influences also include rock music from the 1990s.

The duo's official biography describes an interest in nostalgic themes and musical atmospheres that evoke memories of experiences not necessarily lived by the listener.

The incorporation of elements from Celtic music became part of their musical experimentation during the development of "Limbo".

In an interview with Le Télégramme, Kawamura explained that some of the traditional sounds he encountered in Brittany reminded him of music familiar to him since childhood. He also discussed his interest in bringing together musical traditions from different cultural backgrounds.

== Name ==
The name "iyomante" is derived from iomante, a traditional bear ceremony associated with the culture of the Ainu people, an Indigenous people primarily associated with northern Japan.

In his interview with Le Télégramme, Kawamura discussed his interest in Ainu culture and Japanese traditional cultural practices.

== Members ==
The duo consists of two members:

- Kazunori Kawamura (川村一仁) – vocals, guitar, songwriting, arrangements, recording and mixing. Originally from Urawa, Saitama Prefecture, Japan.
- Gakuya Takahashi (髙橋岳也) – songwriting, composition and bass guitar. Originally from Hamura, Tokyo, Japan.

Both members are involved in songwriting and composition, while Kawamura also handles much of the group's recording and production work.

== Discography ==
=== Studio albums ===
Release date	Title
31 July 2025	What Tomorrow Holds

=== Singles and other releases ===
Release date	Title
31 December 2023	"What Tomorrow Holds" (あしたのハナシ)
31 October 2024	"Alaska" (アラスカ)
29 December 2025	Komorebi / Nostalgia
30 April 2026	"Limbo" (リンボ)
