= Shinda =

Ainu god of fertility

Shinda is the fertility god of the Ainu people. Traditional Ainu recite prayers of thanksgiving to Shinda before every meal.

== See also ==
- Ainu religion
