= Prayer stick =

Stick-shaped object used for prayer

A prayer stick is a stick-shaped object used for prayer.

== Background ==
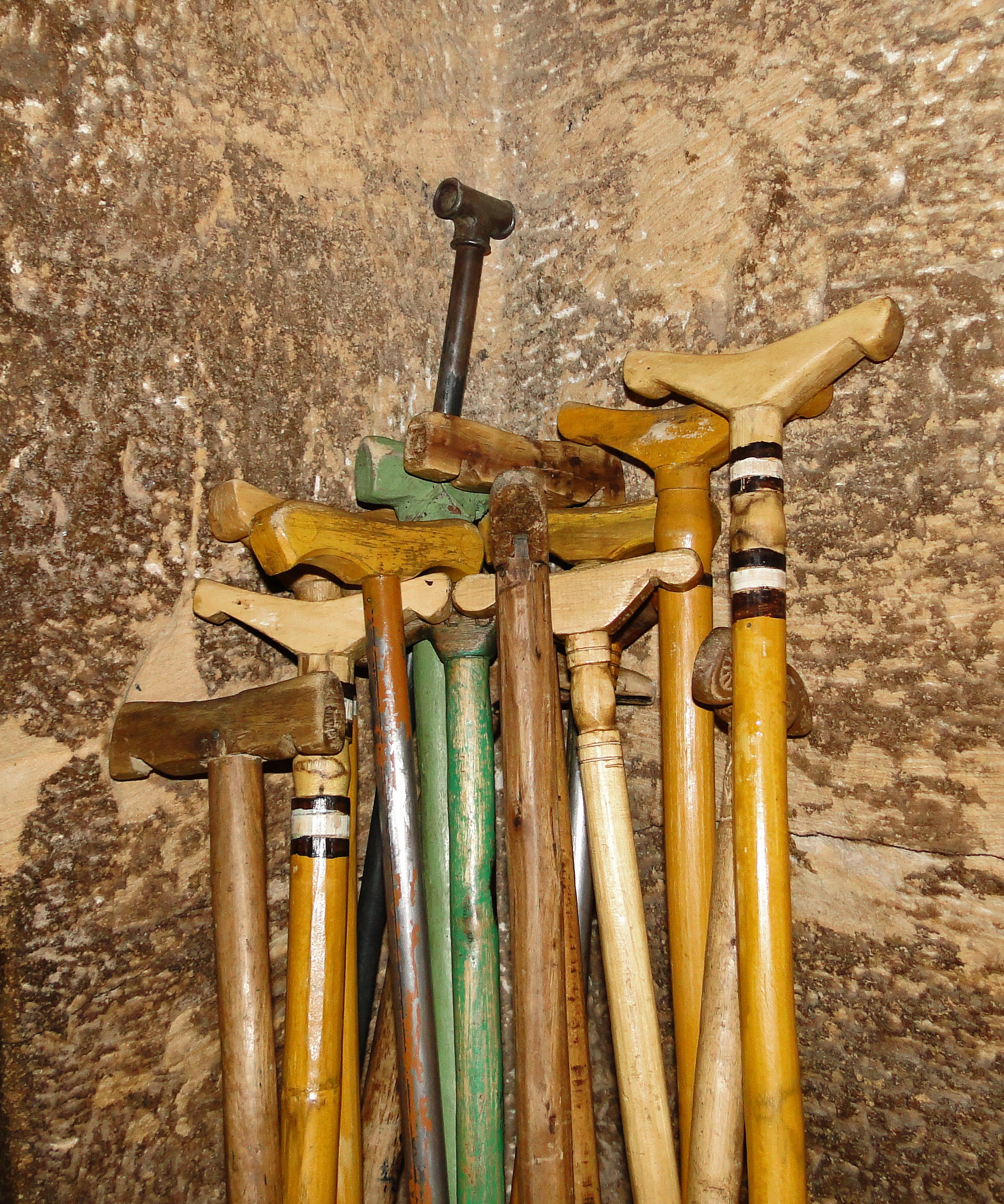
Ethiopian mequamia

In the rituals of the Puebloan people of the American Southwest contain many prayers; thus the Zuñi have prayers for food, health, and rain. Prayer-sticks, that is sticks with feathers attached as supplicatory offerings to the "spirits," were largely used by the Pueblo. These sticks are usually made of cottonwood about seven inches long, and vary in shape, color, and the feather attached, according to the nature of the petitions, and the person praying. The stick is intended to represent the "god" to whom the feathers convey the prayers that are breathed into the "spirit" of the plumes.

The Hopi Indians had a special prayer-stick to which a small bag of sacred meal was attached. Green and blue prayer-sticks are often found in the Pueblo graves and especially in the ceremonial graves of Arizona.

== Other cultures ==
In Ethiopian culture, the handle of a mequamia, a prayer stick, is shaped like a tau cross. The mequamia are used to create rhythm during processions, and to rest on during long services where the priests and worshippers must remain standing.

== See also ==
- Ikupasuy
- Walking stick
