= Kina-sut-kamuy =

Ainu kamuy of snakes

Kina-sut-kamuy (キナスッカムイ) is the Ainu kamuy (god) of snakes in the Japanese mythology. He is a benevolent figure who is called upon for protection against various calamities.

== Mythology ==
Kina-sut-kamuy is depicted as generally benevolent and helpful to humans. He controls the behavior of snakes, protecting those who venerate him from their bites. In Ainu mythology, snake spirits are believed to possess people and cause a variety of ailments such as eye disease and paralysis, and Kina-sut-kamuy is appealed to in order to exorcise these spirits from a victim. He also offers communities protection against other diseases, particularly typhoid.

He is generally said to be the brother of Nusa-kor-kamuy, but the two are sometimes regarded as a single entity.

== See also ==
- Ainu religion
