= Mosir-kara-kamuy =

Ainu god

Mosir-kara-kamuy (Ainu: モシㇼカラカムィ) or Moshirkara Kamuy is an Ainu kamuy (deity). At the command of Kandakoro Kamuy, he is said to have created the earth, shaping it and preparing it for humans to inhabit. Like Kandakoro Kamuy, he plays little part in Ainu mythology after the creation of the world is complete.

== See also ==
- Ainu religion
