= Pawci-kamuy =

Ainu god of insanity

Pauchi Kamuy is the Ainu kamuy (god) of insanity.

== Mythology ==
In Ainu mythology, Pauchi Kamuy is an evil spirit born from the Willow-Soul River in Pikun Kando (High Heaven). It descended to earth to plague humanity with insanity, stomach ailments, food poisoning, seizures, and frenzied dancing. Epidemics of the latter were said to have wiped out several villages in the late 19th century.

== See also ==
- Ainu religion
