= Apasam Kamuy =

Ainu god of the threshold

Apasam Kamuy is the Ainu kamuy (god) of the threshold. Apasam Kamuy is called upon for protection during changes of state.

== Depiction ==
Apasam Kamuy is conceived as either a male and female couple or a dual entity, similar to the Roman Janus. The kamuy oversees transitions, and this dual nature allows Apasam Kamuy to perceive both sides of a transition in order to better guard the supplicant.

== Mythology ==
Apasam Kamuy is called upon whenever a change of state is occurring. This kamuy is called upon to protect women during difficult labor, to protect people against angry kamuy such as the plague god Pakoro Kamuy, to protect travelers on journeys through foreign lands, and, conversely, to protect the Ainu in their dealings with other cultures.

== See also ==
- Ainu religion
