= Yushkep Kamuy =

Goddess of the spiders in Ainu mythology

Yushkep Kamuy is the kamuy (goddess) of the spiders in Ainu mythology. She is also known as Ashketanne Mat (Long-fingered Woman). She is the familiar of female shamans and is called upon to aid in childbirth.

== Mythology ==
Yushkep Kamuy is a benevolent and wise figure in Ainu mythology. Although Ainu women were, traditionally, generally subordinate to men, they held power in some domains, most notably in marriage, where they controlled the choice of partners. One of Yushkep Kamuy's most prominent myths reinforces this autonomy.

According to the legend, Yushkep Kamuy was pursued by Poronitne Kamuy, a demonic being who lived beyond the horizon. A friendly deity warned Yushkep Kamuy of her unwelcome suitor, and she prepared a trap for him, setting her servants to ambush him. She then transformed herself into a reed. When Poronitne Kamuy appeared, he found her home apparently empty and began to search for her. While he searched among the coals of the hearth, her servant Chestnut Boy, who had hidden there, jumped up and struck his eye. When he fell backwards in surprise, he was jabbed by another servant, Needle Boy. Subsequently, his other eye was stung by Hornet Boy, his hand bitten by Viper Boy, and, as he was trying to escape, Mortar Boy and Pestle Boy fell onto his head. The badly injured demon fled, never to be heard from again.

Yushkep Kamuy is said to assist Nusakoro Kamuy in his duties. She is also called upon by women during childbirth, because her long fingers allow her to safely extract the baby.

== See also ==
- Ainu religion
