= Iomante =

Ainu bear sacrifice ceremony

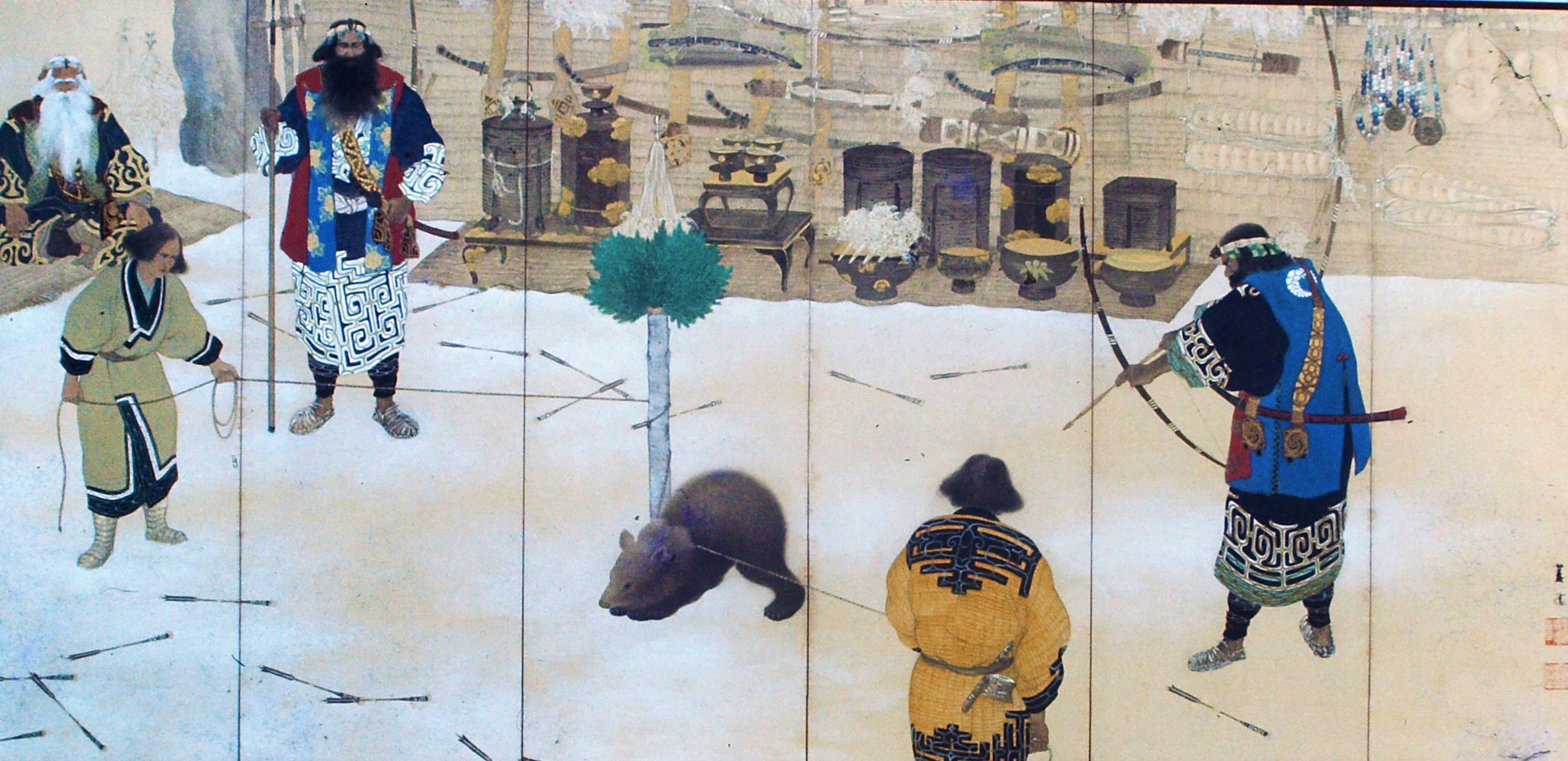
Scene of toying with cub. Ainu kumamatsuri byōbu (アイヌ熊祭屏風) by Yoshinori Murase (Taisho era)

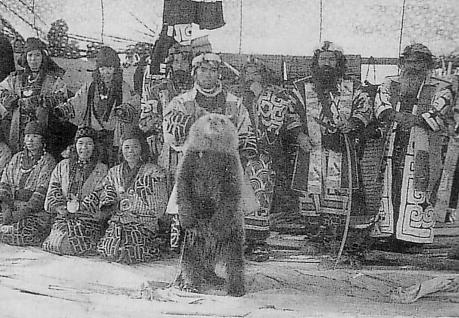
Iomante cub (1930 photo)

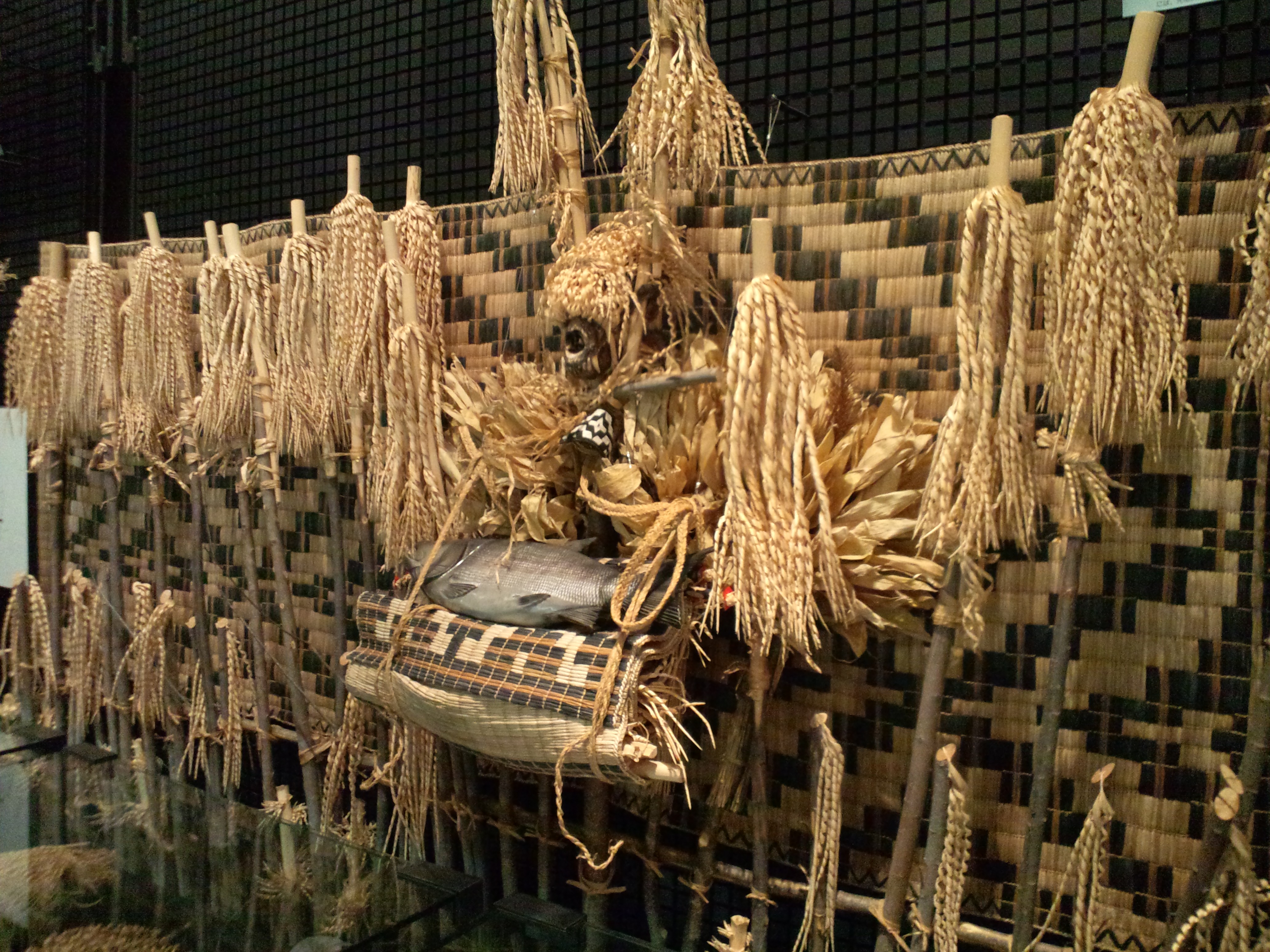
The nusasan (offering altar) with wood-shaving sticks erected. The skull will be placed here, and offerings such as dried salmon are arranged here. (Exhibit at the National Museum of Ethnology in Suita, Osaka)

Iomante (Japanese: イオマンテ), sometimes written as Iyomante (Japanese: イヨマンテ) is an Ainu ceremony of Hokkaido and Sakhalin in which a hand-raised brown bear cub is ceremonially killed, under the belief that the soul merely returns to its god-world (kamuy mosir). The physical body of the bear god is considered merely to be his "disguise" (hopunire), and the pelt and meat harvested are accepted as gifts that the god has left in gratitude for the ceremonious hospitality it received.

The term in some circles is used in the narrow sense of this elaborate ceremony of "sending" fostered animals (hand-raised bear cubs), as opposed to more general "bear sendings" (熊送り, kumaokuri), and the simpler rite performed for the bear or other game animals taken in the wild may be referred to as opunire or hopunire.

The iomante can technically apply to other animals such as owls (e.g. Blakiston's fish owl or shima fukurō), foxes, and raccoon dogs for special rites, and the Ainu home (chise) does accommodate for setting up the nurusan (god-food or offering area) for these animals. (Note: Cf. Udagawa (1992), Fig. 2 "Layout of a typical Ainu dwelling" where the "spirit window" faces northeast and Goto Fig. 7.3 "Ainu house (chise)" where the "window of the gods" faces east.)

== Nomenclature ==
The term iomante (also styled iyomante) derives from i ( 'that') + oman ('go, send to mountain') + te ('make do something', a causative suffix), thus meaning "to make that go", hence "to send it".

Technically, the term can generally apply to any game or prey, such as foxes, raccoon dogs, or owls (cf. § Non-bear sending). (Note: Goto (2000) citing Udagawa (2004a).)

While John Batchelor (1901) glossed "iyomande" as "sacrifice", he takes pains to explain this translation superficially transmits less than the meaning the Ainu has given it, noting that it is not "sacrifice to [other] gods, but an offering to the victim [the bear] himself". The meaning of the sending (that the corporeal body is an outer "disguise" that the bear-god can shed, and the disguise which consists of meat and hide is accepted by the people as a reward from the bear god in return for the hospitality given it) is better explained below.

Often, or at least in certain areas, (Note: Eastern Hokkaido settlements.) the term iomante is reserved strictly to the "sending" that is performed during the special ritual that involves the bear raised in captivity, while the term opunire or hopunire is used for the more informal sending ritual performed on the bear (or other animals such as owls) killed at the hunting ground. The term hopunire breaks down into hop 'buttocks' + puni 'to lift something' + re (causative suffix); hence it means "to cause it to be lifted, or cause it to start off and leave".

In the modern era, iomante generally refers to the sending performed on the brown bear, the only bear native to Hokkaido where the Ainu people were all eventually driven. (Note: Blakiston's Line marks the division where in Hokkaido only the brown bears live, and black bears are not found.)

Also, when sending rather trivial small creatures, the term iwakte might be use. Although iwakte normally refers to the rite of sending off the soul of broken tools or vessels, the sending of a squirrel or hare may be called an iwakte.

== Practice ==
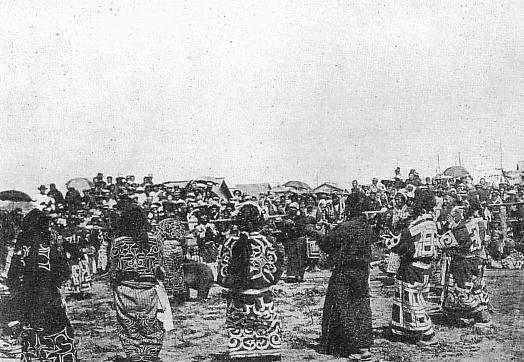
circa 1930

A bear cub is captured and raised in its pen or cage, until the ceremony of iomante, in which it is ritually killed. However, the "bear god" (his soul, cf. below) is merely considered to have returned to his god-world (kamuy mosir), and his carnal body being merely his outer shell (or "disguise", called hayokpe in Ainu) the pelt and meat for food that is harvested is interpreted to be a gift from the bear god in exchange for the ceremonious hospitality it receives at home or in the iomante ceremony.

The creature is brought to the center of the village, tied to a post with the rope. The men in the village then take shots at the cub with blunted ceremonial arrows, until the time comes for it to be slaughtered. The bear is skinned, and the meat is distributed amongst the villagers. Its bare skull is dressed in flowery wood-shavings (inau-kike), placed on a pole, which is then dressed up (or sometimes wrapped in the bear's own fur). This "doll" is an object of worship for the villagers. The bear has now been "sent off".

=== Capture, caging, raising ===
As winter ends around February, a bear cub is captured from the open field, or having been born during its mother's hibernation. The mother bear is killed, and the cub is brought back to the village to be raised in captivity. In the beginning, it is raised like a human child indoors, and even breast-fed until it teethed. After it is weaned and grows larger, it is moved to a cage barred with logs (also called a "pen") known as heper-set (where heper meaning "very young" refers to the cub being raised). It is treated with high-quality food as behooves a guest, (Note: Fish and meat, insects, fruit, tubers, maize. Even honey and sugar.) practically meals fit for humans. The fostering lasts usually until it reaches 1, 2, or up to 3 years of age. (Note: Due to feeding cost, it is usually delivered to the sending ceremony the following spring, where "spring" is the lunar calendar New Year, or about February. Research on the Kamikawa region also received testimony that "1 year was about the limit". Udagawa states: "raised like one's own child until age 2) (Note: Mitsuoka (1931) [1924] states that it is killed after 1 whole year, i.e., in the February of the year after capture.)

When the bear-sending festival season arrives, it is taken out of its cage (sometimes poured sake (grain alcohol) as symbolic of farewell). Thus a specialized cord called the heper-tush (Note: According to a source this cord is woven from nettle (Ainu: mose)) is dangled from between the log bars, and when the loop (or three ropes) snags around the neck, and the bear is bound in tasuki fashion, (Note: This analogy is somewhat ambiguous here it means tasuki of candidates for office, etc., worn baldric-like diagonally across shoulder, as is clear from Batchelor's explanation.) then the lower logs are dislodged, so that the cub can be led out.

=== Festival grounds ===
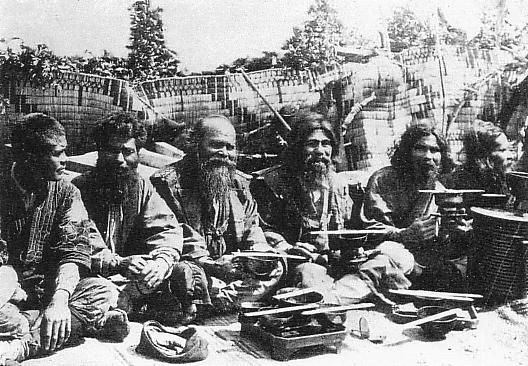
Men engaged in iomante, making offerings (1930 photo)

The festival grounds are typically set up right outside a home. The coaxing of the bear cub out its cage may be conducted before the audience at the festival ground. The woman clap to rhythm raucously but melancholically, singing the 'upopo (festival song) and dancing the rimse to entertain the bear. After the bear is bound, it is made to wear a ponpake (literally "apron", and described as straw cape-like, but actually woven together into a sort of netting from wood-shavings, with decorated cloth called saranpe sewn on it) (Note: One source describes it in short hand as being like a straw cape (mino), but explains that in Ainu the term means apron, and details the material used, etc. The sending an owl, also involves making the bird wear a ponpake, which is similarly described (as woven from wood shavings, with beautifully patterned cloth sewn onto it). Another earlier source states the bear is given a sleeveless pretty garment to wear.)

The bear cub is brought to the open square, and tethered to a stake driven into the ground. (Note: As for illustrations of the stake, cf.) The stake is referred to as a shutu-ni a "club-tree" (Note: Japanese: ッシュットニ, where older transliterations eschew "ッ".) (Note: The stake is supposed to be made of Amur corktree wood (or shuro palm Trachycarpus) depending on localities, The tree is called s[h]ikerepe-ni in Ainu, perhaps related to the variant Japanese name shikoro.) The tip of the stake is decorated with inau wood-shavings. (Note: Many villages also adorn the stake with sasa bamboo leaves. Cf. commentary on the c. 1882 painting by Nishikawa Hokyō, Meiji shoki ainu fūzoku emaki (西川北洋『明治初期アイヌ風俗絵巻』).)

=== Ceremonial arrow-shooting and slaying ===
Then comes the phase in the ceremony where blunted ceremonial arrows referred to as hana ya (花矢; "flower arrows") in Japanese and heper-ay are shot at the bear. These arrows have wooden hooks attached to the tip so that they may penetrate skin but only lightly. The arrowhead is dyed black and carved with intaglio patterns. Also silk-cloth (saranpe) might be tied to it. If the ceremony arrows happen to stick, it is swept off using a bamboo grass switch or broom (takusa). This portion lasts till sunset, and since both people and animal are exhausted, the bear is led back to the stake to rest. Slaughter involves crushing it to death by clasping its neck between two or more logs. (Note: Possibly 5, 6 logs.) This killing contraption is called rek-nunpa-ni ("manytimes-choking-tree"). (Note: Styled Ok numba ni or "poles for strangling" by Batchelor.) If the cub's size has become too unwieldy, an adept elder is chosen to shoot it through the heart with a real arrow. Batchelor (1901) witnessed some of the hardiest men engage in drinking the warm blood, apparently to have courage imparted on them. When the slaughter is over, someone shoots an arrow in the sky signaling the end. The girl who had been assigned to raise the bear is known to cry out in grief.

The brown bear is then butchered so the meat can eventually be served, (though the actual feasting on the meat takes place the next day, on the Poro-Ome-Kabu ("great feast").

=== Offering-place ===
On the festival grounds, the nusasan ("god-food place", "god's altar") is set up where special inau wood-shaving sticks are propped up, and laid out with nikap-umbe (ornamental mat). (Note: Batchelor calls it inao-so.) Various offerings from Ainu sword (emus), quiver (ikayop), sitoki (breast-ornament or necklace), armor, and sintoko (vessels, lacquerware). Also food items such as sito (dumplings made from millet (Note: Cf. Batchelor (1901), p. 485 and dictionary entry.) or nowadays rice flour), (Note: A disc-shaped dango traditionally made from the starches of the Cardiocrinum cordatum (sort of a lily bulb), but later rice became the substitute ingredient so the product was essentially a round mochi in shape (but technically dango if made from rice flour rather than pounding steamed glutinous rice).) dried fish, together with ceremonial arrows are bound together inside a rolled-up ornamental mat, (Note: Batchelor describes the bundle of dried fish (sat-chep shike) and a moustache lifter (ikupasuy) is made into a parcel.) so that the god can shoulder it as a take-home gift (heper-sike). Batchelor learned the name of the take-home gifts to be imoka-sike ("remembrance from the feast") and describes it as strung-up millet cakes.

The bear is laid flat, and arrows or quivers filled with dried salmon (sat-cep) is hung around the neck, and the ponpake apron is laid atop it. Alcoholic drink (traditionally millet brew) is offered in a kip (tall goblet). (Note: Japanese: ッキ, 高杯.) (Note: In later times, clear sake became readily available from the Japanese mainland, but in the past, villagers would craft their own cloudy nigorizake (tonoto) which had to be made in large batches ahead of time, and this as was the case with the dumplings (sito), was assigned to women-folk.) (Note: In the olden days, brewing the tonoto was also done using hie or awa (foxtail millet) instead of rice for the gruel mash base. The tonoto might use rice gruel mash and millet or barley kōji.)

=== Walnut-tossing ===
In the modern-day iomante, after the bear has been slaughtered, there occurs the event of so-called "walnut-tossing", which is plainly similar to the Japanese custom of mochi-maki ("mochi tossing") conducted as shrines, and this aspect has been regarded as a likely borrowed piece of culture due to contact between the Ainu and Japanese.

In the bear-sending performed at Fushiko, Tokachi Subprefecture, after the bear is slaughtered some men climb atop the cage and throw walnuts and chestnuts to the crowd. And during the ceremony in Suwankotan formerly of Nishibetsu, Nemuro-shichō (now part of Shibecha, Kushiro Subprefecture), after the bear is butchered, the elders throw walnuts and thick cuts of dried salmon, which the people vie with each other to collect. A 1920s book also records the distributing of walnuts and mikan oranges.

A much older record survives in Murakami Shimanojō (村上島之允) (aka Hata Awakimaro (秦檍麿))'s painting Ezo-shima kikan (蝦夷島奇観; 1799/1800, "Curious views of Ezo Island") that chestnuts and kibi (millet or perhaps rice cake) were distributed. (Note: Japanese: "栗の実や粢（キビないし米の餅のこと）" (Cf. § Progress of the rite).)

=== Overall flow after slaughter ===
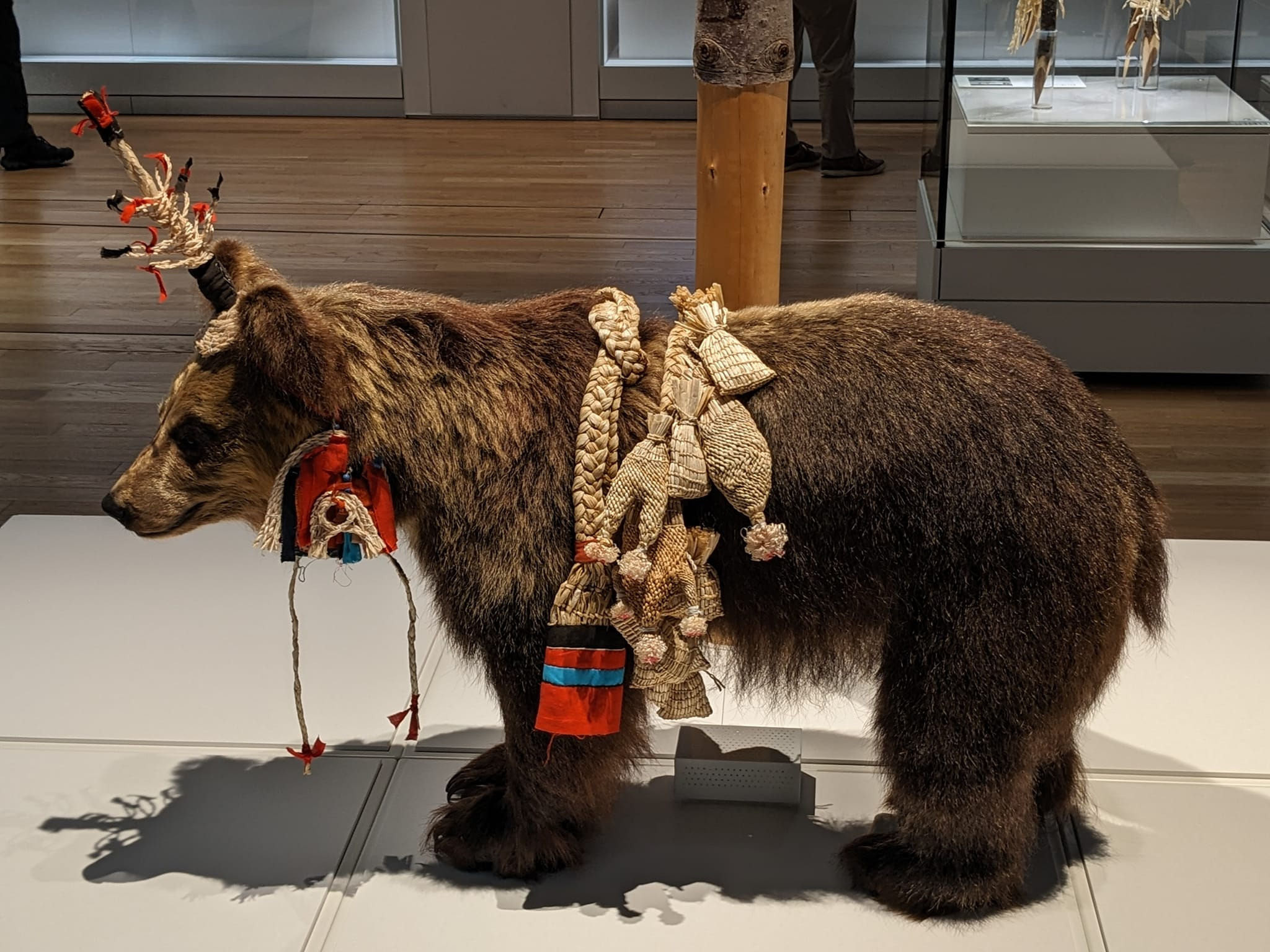
Reconstruction of the iomante of the Sakhalin Ainu (exhibit at Upopoy, the National Ainu Museum)

There follows the process of trying to remove the fleshed head from the entire fur-pelt with the head part still attached. That head is then "cleaned". (Note: By cleaning, this means carving off the head flesh, removing the eyeballs and tongue, and scraping out the brain, leaving the skull.) The skull (marat) is then taken indoors to have un-memke (Note: Japanese: ウンメンケ/ウンメムケ.) (decorating the skull, explained further under § Un-memke), after which the skull is moved out through the "window of gods" and affixed to a pole, which propped up in the decorated nusasan (god-offering) area. Now the hopunire (sending) of the head (marat) is considered complete, and the ceremonial part of the iomante is virtually done as well, (Note: Sato (2005) citing Ifukube (1965) and Inukai & Natori (1940)) with the carousels to follow until the third night.

=== Un-memke ===
The skull decorating or un-memke is typically performed indoors in front of the altar, but may be performed outdoors at the kamuy-nusa (the bear's nusasan) adorned with wood-shavings called inau-kike, inaw-kike in Ainu or kezuri-bana (削り花; lit. "shaving flower") in Japanese. Cavities like the eye-sockets are filled with these shavings, and other decor is made, differing depending on the region. (Note: For example, a kike-ush pashui (sake chopsticks adorned with shavings) or ipe-pashui (eating chopsticks) may be attached.)

It is noted that some pieces of skin or flesh may remain on the skull which will eventually decay away after it is propped up on display (cf. below), but as illustrations show, the bear's ears remain attached, and this is deliberately done so in some regions. Thus in the aforementioned Suwankotan hamlet, it had been customary to leave the snout portion beyond the eyes intact on the skull, until this was discontinued due to mercantile reasons of preserving the hide's fetch price. But the custom of keeping the ears intact has remained. Furthermore, a film of subcutaneous connective tissue is crafted into a torii-shaped (Π-shaped) ribbon, and is then wound in shavings, to form a sike-tar ("gift rope") for carrying his takehome gifts back.

The skull is placed in front of the hearth, and here too offerings are made: necklace, shito dumplings, bows (ku), decorated sword (emus), etc. The sapanpe (Note: Source gives sapa-un-pe サパウンペ.) or ritual crown used by the elder may also be offered, and the final farewell prayer kamui-nomi is pronounced. A portion of the foodstuff such as the shito dumplings, the clouded sake (tonoto), and meshi (roughly speaking, "rice") (Note: "At a bear-sending or wedding, meshi made of hie (Japanese barnyard millet) [rather than rice] heaped in a high mound on a bowl is the proper official" etiquette for making the offering.) has been set aside specifically for offerings, and separated from what people are allowed to consume.

When the decorating is done, the skull is moved out through "window of gods" or "spirit window" (kamuy puyar), and affixed securely to the yuk-sapa-o-ni (lit. "bear head mounting tree".), or keoman[t]e-ni ("pole for sending away"). (Note: In some places, the sequence differs so that the decorated head already attached to the pole passes through the "window of the gods" to the nusasan altar.)

The skull and pole might then get "dressed up" by having the ponpake cape/apron suspended from the head, or be made to wear a kapar-amip (embroidered dress). (Note: Kubodera states: "I have heard that in some of the eastern Hokkaido villages, it is made to wear the bear-cub hide, but this is yet unheard of in my own field studies".)

=== Interpretations ===
The bear god when freshly slaughtered still has his soul (ramat) abiding (usually "between the ears"), and this must be separated and released for its passage back home to the gods dominion (kamuy mosir), and this is the purpose of the festival. The religious interpretation is that the god assumes the guise of a brown bear to visit the human world, and after receiving hospitality for a time from the humans, the humans conduct a parting farewell carousel, to send him back to the god world. The flesh and hide gained from the slaughter is considered the god's parting gift, and reward for the iomante which was the act of humans entertaining the god. As for the take-home gift for the bear god (heper-shike), this was already discussed above. The ceremonial "flower-arrows" are also part of the gift, and according to Ainu belief, when these arrows are swatted down with the takusa broom and broken into shaft and point, the soul of the arrow is separated, and becomes able to be taken to the kamui world.

There is also the interpretation that when the bear god is entertained in this way, he is encouraged to return once again (or otherwise come under its auspices ), and the Ainu people are blessed with plentiful hunting harvest. (Note: However, since the bear is considered " king of the mountains" (山の王者) or "king of the forest", it has power over all sorts of blessings of nature, and the hunt of all kinds of animals.)

So the gift to the bear-god is in part a bribe to induce its return (or blessing). In fact, during the iomante, the reciting of the yukar is deliberately interrupted at climactic spot, so that the frustrated god will return to hear the rest of it.

Similar bear-sending rites are known among the hunter people of the taiga terrain of the Eurasian polar regions, such as the Nivkh people around Sakhalin.

The prefectural government of Hokkaido issued a notification signed by the governor in 1955 that declared iomante a "savage rite", that de facto banned the practice. The notification was revoked in April 2007.

=== Progress of the rite ===
The shogunate official Murakami Shimanojō (村上島之允) pen named Hata Awakimaro (秦檍麿) painted Ezo-shima kikan (蝦夷島奇観; 1799, "Curious views of Ezo Island") annotated with inscriptions. This is perhaps the oldest documentary attestation to "iomante".

The painting has been recopied many times over by a number of artists (including the 1807 held by the Tokyo National Museum).

It contains 5 scenes relating to the bear-sending ceremony:

- Inau-making and people surrounding the caged cub (cf. Fig (1) below, Brooklyn Museum copy)
- Cub being shot with flower-arrows
- Cub being choked by logs (cf. Fig. (4) below, Hakodate Library copy of 1847)

The inscription states that chestnuts and millets (or rice cakes) were cast at the gathered Ainu crowd. (Note: This is legible from the image of Matsuura's copy, which seems to read "粟" (millet), but transcriptions all emend this to the similar "栗" (chestnut). Tanimoto (2000) reads this painting (Kikan) the same way but also cites a different source that states millet (粟) and rice were thrown.) and also that the bear's caretaker-woman tumbles to ground in tears. (Note: Japanese: 熊の世話係だった女性が転び泣き伏す、とある".)

- Arranging the bear on the altar and offering prayer (Fig. (5) British Museum copy of 1850–80). (Note: The Tokyo National Museum now houses Hata's (Murakami's) own holograph copy dated 1800. The inscriptions differ in that the originals combine kanji characgters. For Matsuura Takeshirō's copied painting held by the Hakodate Library, the inscription has been redacted thus: "On the nusia-san kata (nusa-san-kata, wood-shaving decorated shelf for offerings) swords, daggers, jade vessels, and other various items adorned with gold and silver were on display, and [the god] venerated by bringing out all sorts of treasure-vessels. The killed bear was placed on the center seat, made to wear Ainu clothing and earrings, as well as sword.. (造飾したるヌシヤサンカタ（幣を勝たる棚）に太刀、短刀、玉器、其外金銀を鏤たる器種々かざりありとあらゆる宝器を出してあがなへり。扨（さて）殺したる熊を席の中央に置、夷服を着さしめ耳鐶又太刀を帯さしめ、..)")
- Banquet inviting Japanese officials (Note: In Fig (5) below, the inscription for the following scene (in katakana) can be read (or with kanji representation in the holograph), where it says "On this occasion, the shihainin manager [of the basho] and the bannin guards were [invited] as guests". Everyone including children are offered sake to drink 3–5 days, and the next day, the pelt is worn and the bear eaten as atsumono soup dish.)
Scenes from the Ceremony

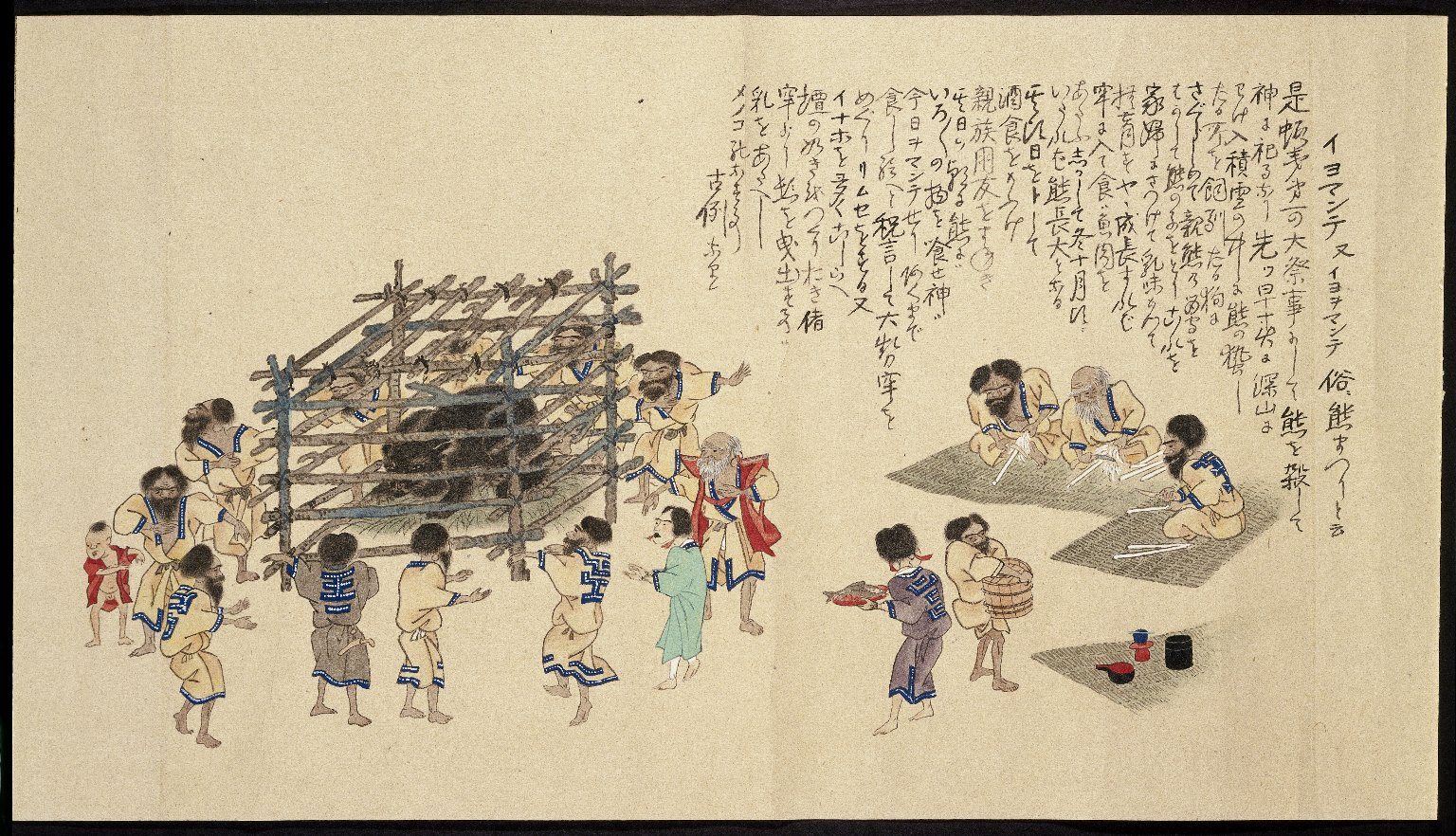
(1) Preparations. An elder shaving the inu, the women preparing sake. On the left villagers surround the caged bear and lamenting their parting.

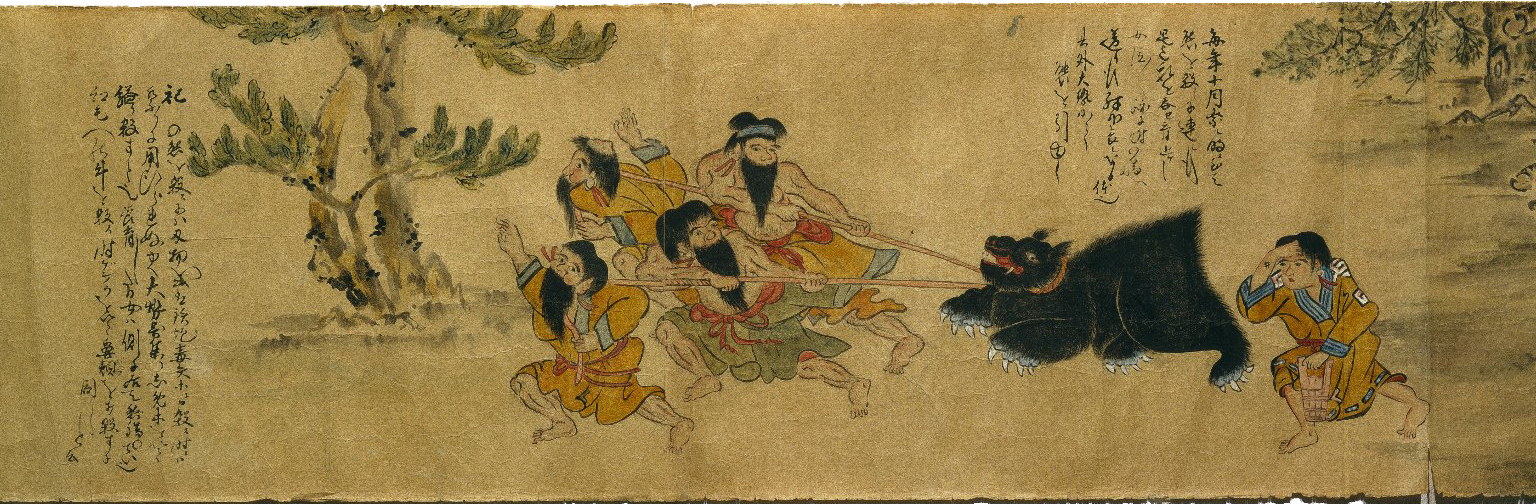
(2) Coaxing the caged bear out by a leash, to the ceremony grounds. The bear's keeper woman follows.

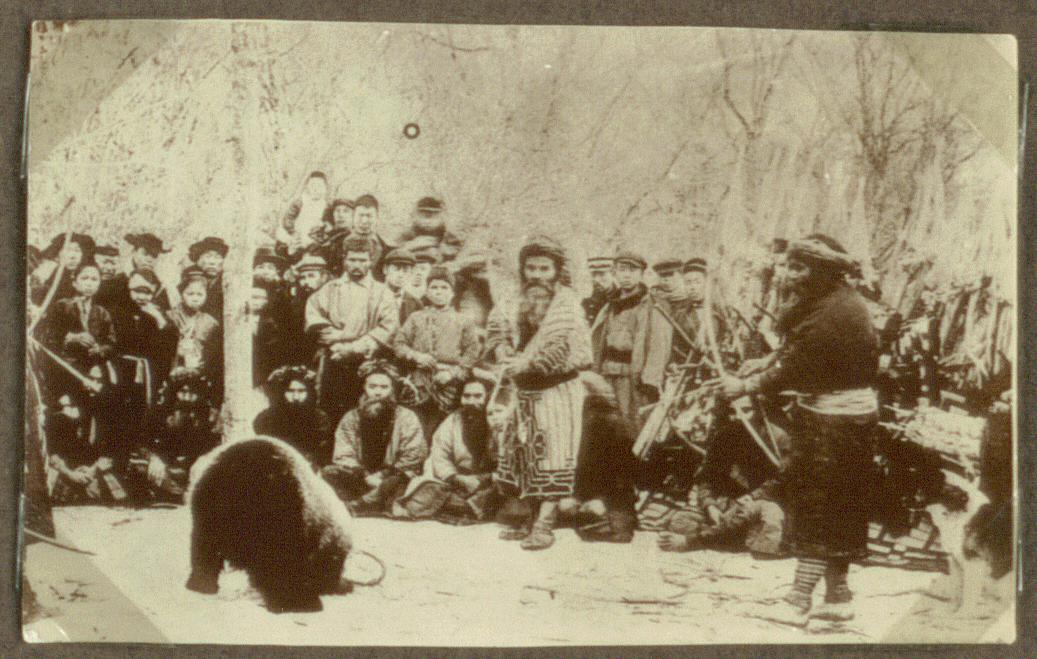
(3) Bear tied to stake, and shot with the heper-ai (the blunted "cub-arrows"). A 1914 photo.

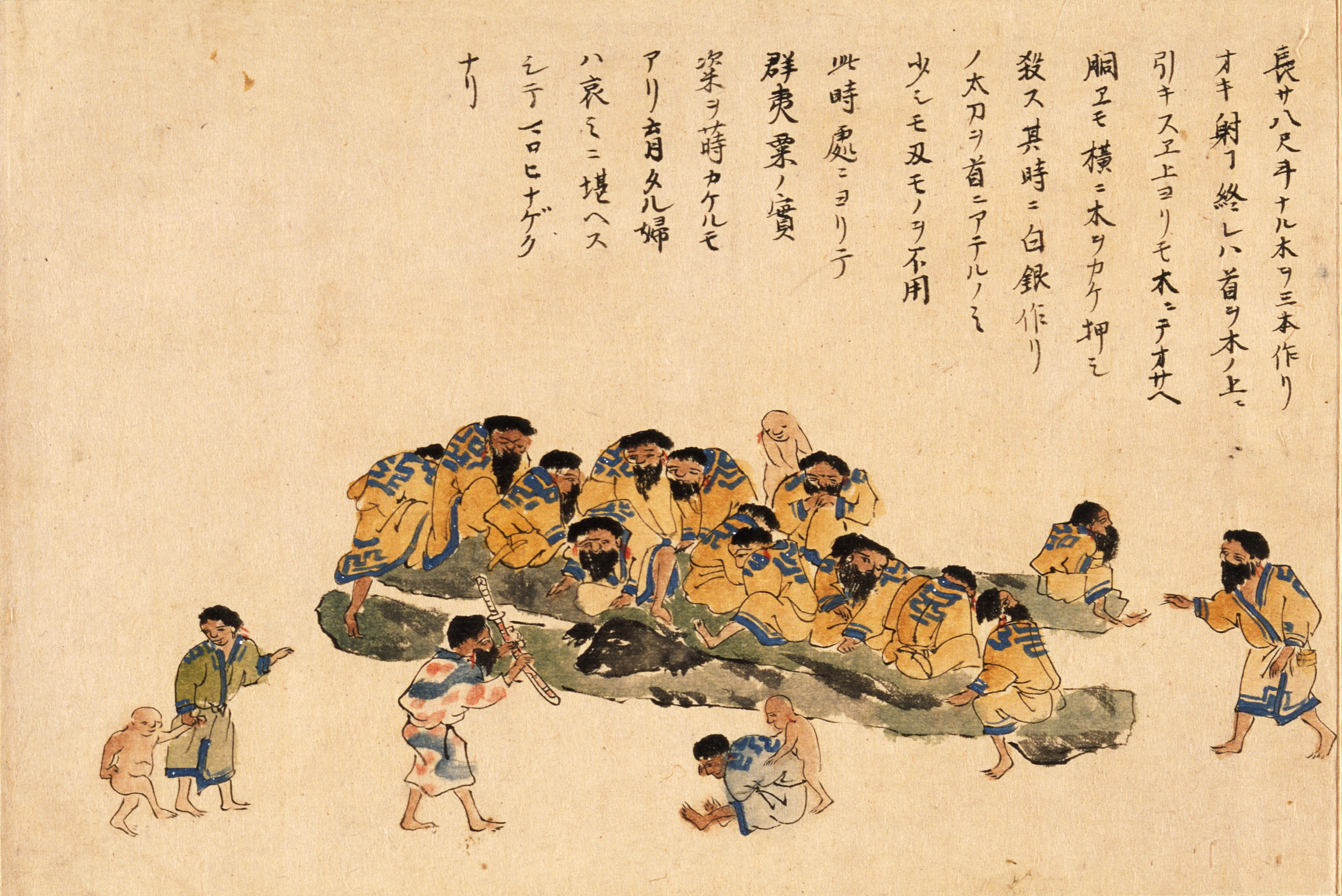
(4) Bear choked between logs to release its soul from its body.

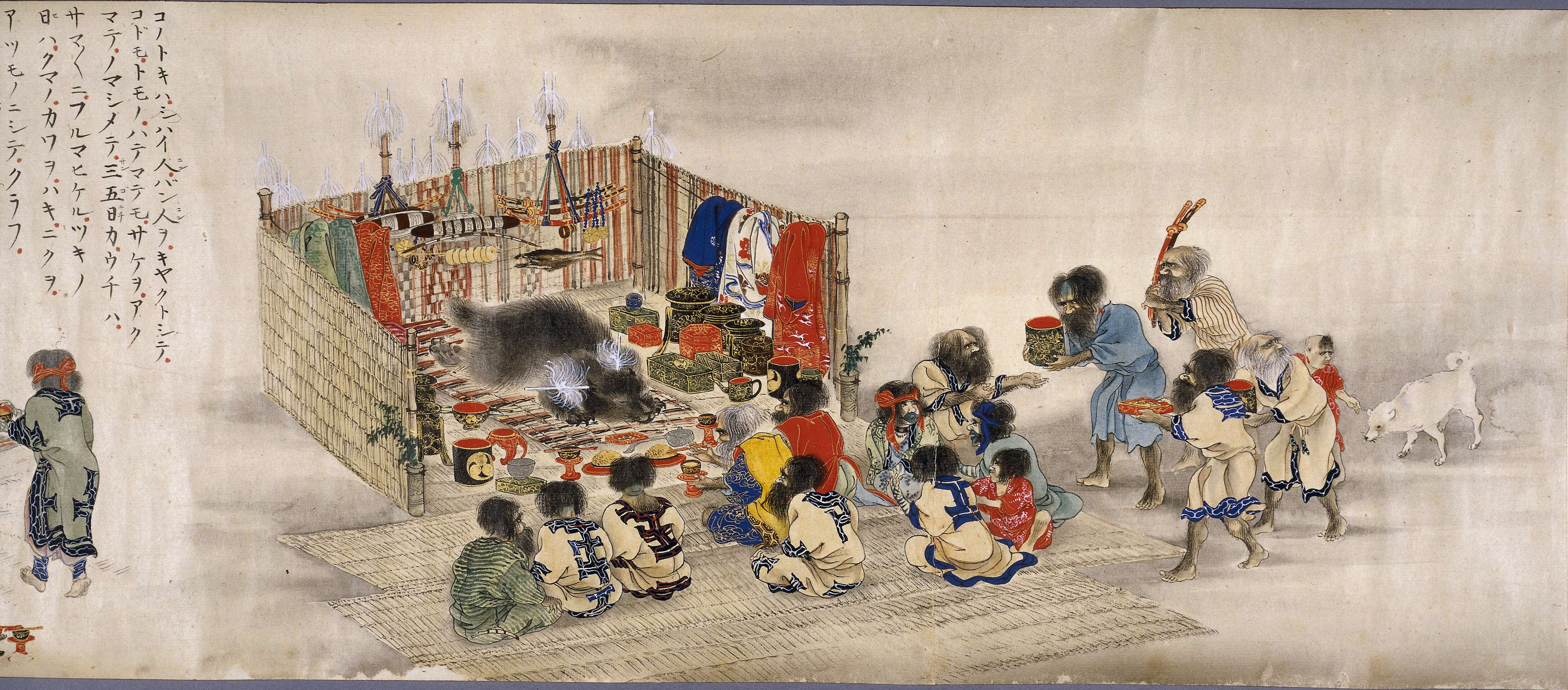
(5) The bear's pelt and flesh already separated from its soul is laid out on the shrine altar, with offerings of sake, inau, prayer, etc. After this, the skull will be propped up in the nusasan area (Note: A place for "nusa" which is the Japanese word for inau.) and magnificently decorated with inau. (Note: In this copy, the inscription is blanked and wanting, and a portion of the inscription for the next scene can be read, as explained in a forgoing note.)

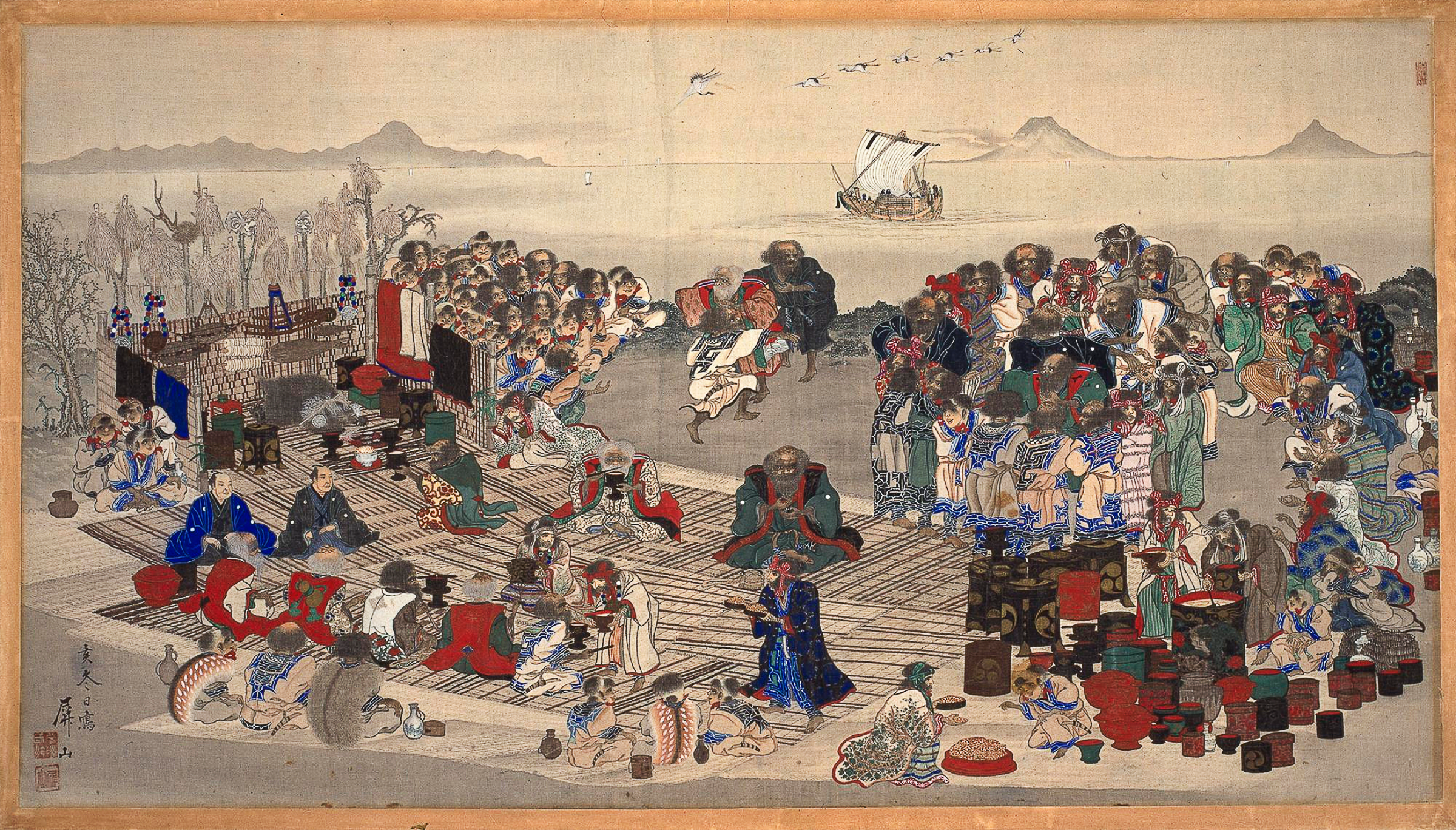
(6) The festivities after the iomante. The villagers regale themselves in carousal and dance. At the head seat (kamiza) nearest the altar sits the shihainin (manager) of the basho commerce center. An Ainu-e by Hirasawa Byōzan (1875).

=== Non-bear sending ===
As for iomante conducted on animals other than the bear, sending of the kotan-kamuy (Blakiston's fish owl, 'guardian of the community') is held to be of importance in certain areas.

Owl-sending is also known as kamuy-hopunire. and the sending of Blakiston's fish owl (shima fukurō) in particular has been designated mosir-kor-kamuy-hopunire.

Also there is iomante conducted for the orca (Rep-un-kamuy 'god of far sea'). The brown bear, the kotan-guarding owl, and the orca which are honored with the iomante ceremony are considered to be kamuy of higher order.

== Early history and origins ==
On the origins of iomante, scholar Takao Ikeda (2000) recently wrote a survey on the various theories by scholars.

Hitoshi Watanabe (1974) proposed the theory that iomante was introduced from the medieval Okhotsk culture (until 13th cent.). (Cf. § Okhotsk derivation theory)

Whereas Hiroshi Udagawa (1989) delivered the opinion that while the simpler forms of bear-sending is archaeologically evidenced in skulls found at 15th (or 14th) century sending sites, the "iomante in the stricter sense" (cub-fostering type) probably didn't develop until the latter half of the 18th century, so the older culture cannot be directly linked.

Ainu history professor Kazuyuki Nakamura assessed that the iomante ceremony was already established in the time before Shakushain's revolt, (1669), (Note: Nakamura (1999) apud Udagawa (2002), after Ikeda (2000).) since an altercation developed between Shakushain and another chief Onibishi over whether the former was willing to part with one of the two bear cubs he obtained.

Early recorded instances where the Ezo people conducted an iomante type bear-sending occurred is documented in Matsumiya Kanzan's Ezo-dan hikki (蝦夷談筆記, Hōei7/1710) and Sakakura Genjirō (Note: 坂倉源次郎)'s Hokkai zuihitsui (北海随筆, Genbun 4/1739), stating the Ainu fostered the bear by having a woman suckle the cub, slaughtering it within the year, and holding a banquet. However, these Edo Period Japanese writers regarded the conduct as strictly a venal enterprise to fatten the cub and harvest its meat and gall bladder, so the sending aspect is not clearly elaborated. Perhaps the earliest explicit mention of iomante (Note: womante (ヲマンテ) in text.) occurs in the in Hata Awakimaro's Ezo kenbunki (蝦夷見聞記; "Record of things seen and heard in Ezo", Kansei 10/1798) followed by Ezo-shima kikan (1799) already detailed above.

A heretofore overlooked piece of evidence according to Hiroto Hirayama is the mention of iomante being conducted by the Ainu in Kitashiretoko Peninsula, Karafuto (present day Cape Patience, Sakhalin) in the 1643 voyage logs of Maarten Gerritszoon Vries.。

=== Okhotsk derivation theory ===
Due to the lack of archaeological evidence in Satsumon culture strata (until 1200 CE) for any sending rite ceremonies among the Ainu in Japan, there has developed the view that the simpler sending (hopunire) and iomante was probably transmitted from the Okhotsk culture (of the period to 13th century), which is associated with the Nivkh people, indirectly via the Tobinitai culture. There certainly was a cultural transmission of some sort, and the change from earthenware to metalware usage marked the advent of the so-called "Ainu Culture", dated to approximately the 1450–1667 period, and while it may be possible that a field-type sending rite had been transmitted in that time frame, iomante in the narrower sense of "cub-fostering type sending" is not evident until the so-called "New Ainu Culture" age (from later half of 18th century), Udagawa has argued one cannot establish a direct connection, with some other explanation needed to bridge the gap.

=== Jōmon culture derivation theory ===
Another hypothesis is that the wild boar rites conducted during the Jōmon period eventually evolved into a sending rite for bears (archaeologist Takurō Segawa, 2016).

Another archaeologist, Hideji Harunari (1995) had already floated the idea that pork-farming was transmitted from the Mohe people (Katsumatu) on the Asian continent, and this eventually developed in to bear-raising and bear ceremony. (Note: Harunari (1995) apud Udagawa (2002), via Ikeda (2000).)

=== Reconstruction of the past ===
It is believed that in the past, iomante could be performed to send back the kamui of any game animal hunted and killed. In particular, even though the iomante has generally become associated with sending brown bears (which dwell in Hokkaido), when the Ainu still lived in parts of the Honshu mainland they could have only hunted the Asian black bear (tsukinowa guma), and that bear species must have been used .

== Legality ==
Hokkaido encouraged local governments to abolish the Iomante in 1955, but the prefecture-issued notice was revoked in April 2007, because the Ministry of the Environment of Japan announced that animal ceremonies were generally regarded as an exception of the animal rights law of Japan in October 2006.

== Museum displays ==
Iomante videos and artifacts are on display at the Nibutani Ainu Culture Museum in Nibutani, Hokkaidō, as well as the Ainu Museum in Shiraoi-cho, Hokkaidō.

== Audiovisual resources ==
- Hokkaido University Botanical Gardens has in its archives on the northern people a footage of bear-sending made by Hokkaido University during the pre-war period when it was called an Imperial University.
- A 1977 bear-sending in Nibutani conducted under the supervision of Kayano Shigeru was filmed by folklorist Tadayoshi Himeno under the title Iyomante kuma okuri (イヨマンテ 熊おくり).
- In January 1985, Kawakami District revived the iomante after a 29-year hiatus, whose footage was published in laser disc format unde the title Sekai minzoku ongaku taikei1: KIta/Higashi Ajia hen (世界民族音楽大系1 北・東アジア篇) (Victor Company of Japan).

== See also ==
- Ainu religion
- Peijaiset, a bear sacrifice ritual of Finland
- Bear-sending, a looser terminology of the sacrificial/dedicatory rite
- Iyomante no yoru, a 1950 popular song composed by Yūji Koseki
- The Clan of the Cave Bear, a novel about a prehistoric society centred on a similar sacrifice
- Bear worship
