= Ikupasuy =

Ceremonial sticks in Ainu culture

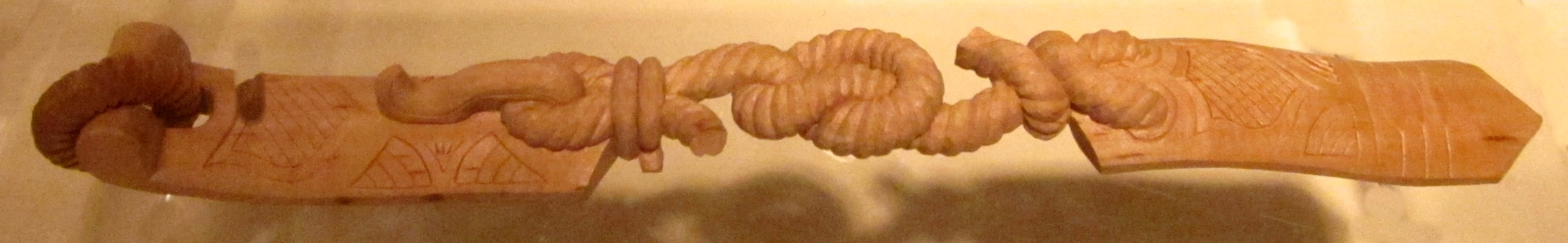
A katsura tree ikupasuy

Ikupasuy (Ainu: イクパスイ, ikupasuy; Sakhalin Ainu: イクニㇱ, ikunis) are wooden, carved ceremonial sticks used by Ainu men when making offerings to spirits.

== Background ==
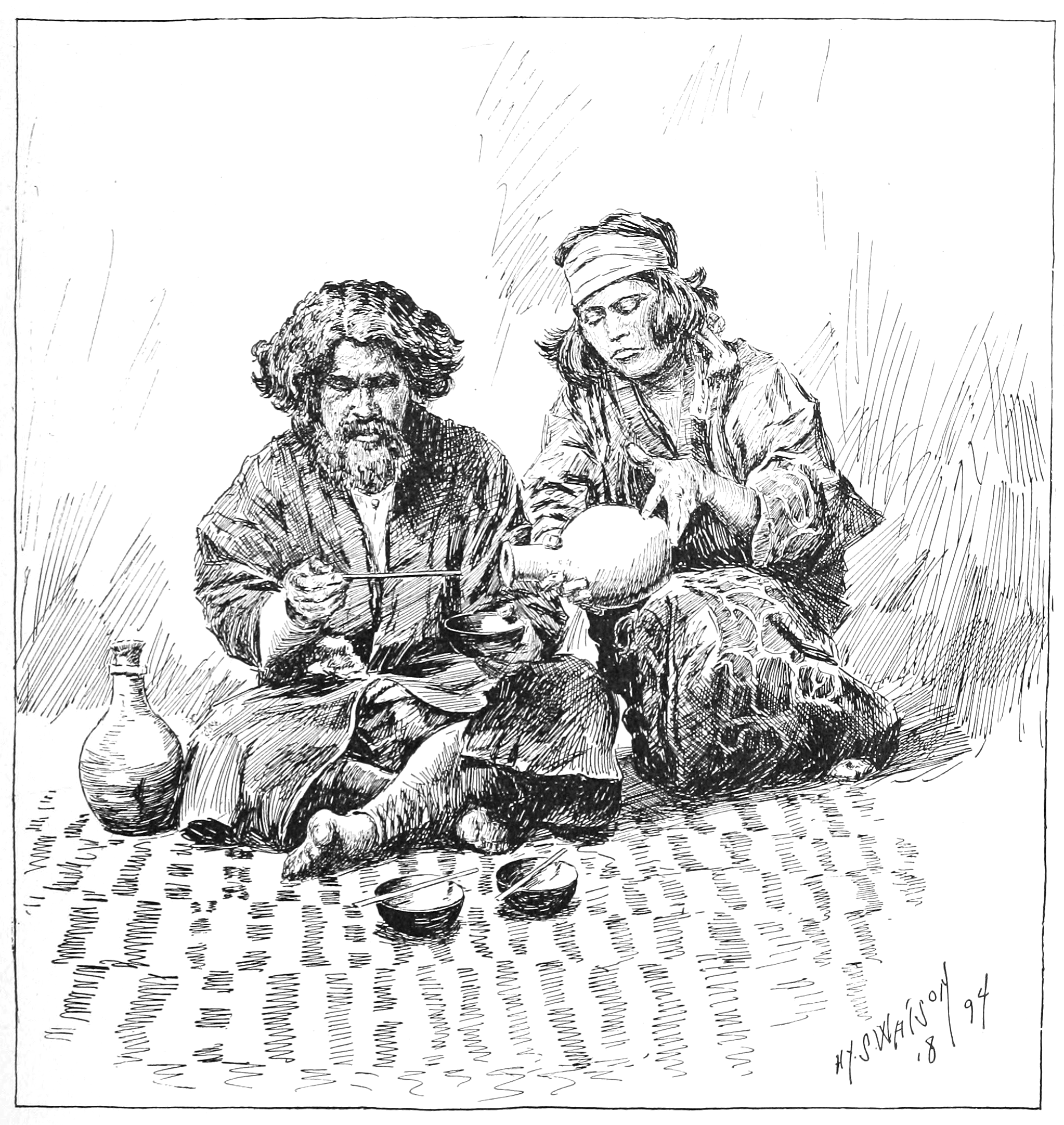
An illustration of ikupasuy usage by Henry Sumner Watson (1897)

The central section of an ikupasuy is decorated, featuring animals, floral motifs as well as abstract designs. The ends of an ikupasuy bear designs that represent the patriarchal lineage of the owner. The Ainu believe that the designs on the ends of the ikupasuy help the spirits in identifying the person who made the offering. The underside of the ikupasuy may on some occasions be carved with various symbols called shiroshi. A common shiroshi is symbol representing the killer whale. The pointed end of the ikupasuy is known as the "tongue". The libation process is performed when the ikupasuy's "tongue" placed into a lacquerware cup or saucer, containing millet beer or sake. Drops of the liquid then fall upon the venerated object. The Ainu limited their representation of animals to the ikupasuy. Ainu men occasionally used the ikupasuy as a mean to lift their moustaches, leading non-Ainu observers of this habit to call them moustache lifters. Another name is "libation sticks".

== See also ==
- Ainu religion
- Inau
- Prayer stick
- Sacrifice
