= Kanda-koro-kamuy =

Ainu god of the sky

Kanda-koro-kamuy is the Ainu kamuy (god) of the sky. He is the prime originator of Ainu mythology, responsible either directly or indirectly for the creation of all things.

== Mythology ==
While Kanda-koro-kamuy is believed to be a powerful kamuy, he is not presented as a supreme being. He is also in many ways a background figure: while his presence was necessary for the creation of the world, he plays only a small part in subsequent events, often as a mediator. He is considered the overseer and master of the sky, much as Cikap-kamuy is the overseer of the land.

He appointed Mosir-kara-kamuy to shape the earth, preparing it for inhabitation by humankind.

== See also ==
- Ainu religion
