= Cikap-kamuy =

Ainu god of owls and land

Cikap-kamuy (also called Kotan-kor-kamuy, which should not be confused with Kotan-kar-kamuy) is the Ainu kamuy (god) of owls and the land. He is responsible for overseeing the behavior of humans and kamuy. He is considered a deity of material success.

== Depiction ==
Cikap-Kamuy is depicted as a great owl, as opposed to smaller owls (such as little horned owl) that represent demons and other malicious spirits. The Ainu believed that the owl watched over the mosir (country) and local kotan (villages), so Cikap-Kamuy came to be represented as the master of the domain. In some areas, his tears were said to be gold and silver.

== Mythology ==
Cikap-Kamuy's most important myth establishes him as a god of plenty who ensures that rituals are being enacted properly. As the story goes, famine had struck the land, and humankind was starving. Cikap-Kamuy wished to send a message to heaven inquiring about the cause of the famine, and he asked Crow to be his messenger. His message and instructions were very lengthy, however, and it took him days to recite them. On the third day, Crow fell asleep, and Cikap-Kamuy grew angry and killed him. Cikap-Kamuy next asked Mountain Jay to be his messenger, but on the fourth day, Mountain Jay fell asleep and was killed in turn. The third messenger was the Dipper Bird, who listened respectfully for six full days until Cikap-Kamuy finally completed the recitation of the message. Dipper Bird then flew to the heavens, and returned with news that the kamuy of fish and game were angry because humans had stopped showing proper respect for the gifts they gave. Accordingly, Cikap-Kamuy went to the humans and taught them the proper rituals to be enacted after killing a fish or a deer. Once the humans began performing these rituals, the kamuy were appeased, and the famine ceased.

The Ainu considered the hondo crow and the mountain jay birds of ill omen as a result of this myth. The dipper, in contrast, was a sign of good fortune.

In another myth Cikap-Kamuy has a sister, forced to marry Okikurmi, after he defeats the owl god in a fight.

== In art and popular culture ==
- In Doodle Champion Island Games, Cikap-Kamuy is known as Fukuro, and is described as a large owl sitting on top of a perch on the Champion Island Mountain, overseeing the Climbing Sport.
- Hisuian Decidueye is possibly inspired by Cikap-kamuy.
- The First Symphony of Japanese composer Takashi Yoshimatsu bears the title Kamui-Chikap Symphony.

== See also ==
- Ainu religion

== Bibliography ==
- Ashkenazy, Michael. Handbook of Japanese Mythology. Santa Barbara, California: ABC-Clio, 2003.
- Etter, Carl. Ainu Folklore: Traditions and Culture of the Vanishing Aborigines of Japan. Chicago: Wilcox and Follett, 1949.
- Munro, Neil Gordon. Ainu Creed and Cult. New York: Columbia University Press, 1995.
