= Kamuy-huci =

Goddess in Ainu mythology

Kamuy-huci (カムィフチ) is the Ainu kamuy (goddess) of the hearth. Her full name is Apemerukoyan-mat Unamerukoyan-mat (Rising Fire Sparks Woman/Rising Cinder Sparks Woman), and she is also known as Iresu Kamuy (People Teacher). She is among the most important kamuy of Ainu mythology, serving as keeper of the gateway between the world of humans and the world of kamuy.

== Depiction ==
Kamuy-huci is a woman who lives in the hearth. Her position is so important that she never leaves her home. Accordingly, the hearth fire must never be extinguished completely.

She wears six layers of kimono tied with a sash, and another six layers of kimono on top that are left to flutter freely.

== Mythology ==
There are a few myths of Kamuy-huci's origins. In the most common, she descends from the heavens, accompanied by Kanna Kamuy, the kamuy of thunder and lightning. In another version, she was born from the fire-producing drill and is the sister of Hasinaw-uk-kamuy, the goddess of the hunt. A third holds that she is the daughter of an elm tree by the prime originator Kanda-koro-kamuy.

After Kotan-kar-kamuy created the world, Kamuy-huci descended to the world to provide humans with fire, as the world was devoid of vegetation. Kamuy-huci also instructed Ainu women in the making of kut (sacred girdles). For this gift, she earned the name Iresu Kamuy (People's Teacher).

She is one of the most powerful kamuy in Ainu mythology. In one myth, her husband is seduced by Wakka-us-kamuy, the deity of fresh water. Kamuy-huci, insulted, challenges her rival to a duel of sorcery, from which she emerges victorious with relative ease. Her chastened husband returns home.

Kamuy-huci is a guardian of the home, and also the judge of domestic affairs. Those who pollute a hearth or fail to maintain proper domestic relationships are said to incur her punishment. To aid her in these duties, since she does not leave the hearth, she employs a number of other kamuy, including Mintakoro-kamuy, the guardian of a home's premises, and Rukoro-kamuy, the kamuy of the privy.

In addition to being the center of the Ainu household, the hearth was considered a gateway by means of which humans and kamuy could communicate. It is also the abode of the dead; the Ainu word for ancestor translates as those who dwell in the hearth. Transmigration is a tenet of Ainu mythology, so it was doubly important for the hearth to be kept pure, because the souls of the departed who lived there would be assigned to new bodies in time.

== In popular culture ==
- Typhlosion's Hisuian Form is possibly based on a psychopomp. Due to the setting of Pokémon Legends: Arceus, the game it first appeared in, in an Ainumosir-inspired region, it may be specifically inspired by Kamuy-huci.

== See also ==
- Ainu religion
- Kitchen god
- Zàojūn, Chinese kitchen god
- Kōjin, Japanese kitchen god
- Hestia, Greek goddess of the hearth
- Vesta (mythology), Roman goddess of the hearth
