= Rep-un-kamuy =

Ainu kamuy (god) of the sea

Rep-un-Kamuy is the Ainu kamuy (god) of the sea.

== Depiction ==
Rep-un-Kamuy is sometimes depicted as an orca. In other instances, he is a carefree, somewhat mischievous young man armed with a harpoon.

== Mythology ==
Rep-un-Kamuy is an important figure in Ainu mythology because the sea represents opportunities for harvests that could not be found on land: fishing, the hunting of whales, and maritime trading expeditions. One of his myths displays his carefree nature and his generosity.

In the story, he harpoons a whale and her young, and throws them ashore near a human village. When he arrives at home, he is visited by a sea wren, who tells him that the humans are cutting up the whales using sickles and axes — that is, not showing proper respect to the animal or to Rep-un-Kamuy as the gift-giver. Rather than growing angry, he laughs, saying that the meat belongs to the humans and they can do with it as they like. A short time later, he sets out again, and he happens to pass the same village, where he finds that the sea wren has lied: the humans are dressed in ritual robes and cutting the flesh from the whales with sacred swords, in the proper manner. Moved by this display of piety, Rep-un-Kamuy assures the humans that the bounty of the sea will keep them from famine.

Rep-un-Kamuy is also credited with saving a village on Hokkaido from a giant spider, Yaushikep, by pulling it into the sea from Uchiura Bay and transforming it into the octopus-like creature Akkorokamui.

== Other ==
Respecting orcas as deities, Ainu tribes held traditional funerals for stranded or deceased orcas (such as on Rebun Island) akin to funerals for other animals such as brown bears.

== See also ==
- Animal worship
- List of water deities
