= Ae-oyna-kamuy =

God and culture hero in Ainu mythology

Ae-oyna-kamuy (アエオイナカムイ) or Oyna-kamuy (オイナカムイ) for short is an Ainu kamuy (god) and culture hero. In Ainu mythology, he is credited with teaching humans domestic skills, and for this reason he is called Ainurakkur (アイヌラックㇽ, father of the Ainu or father of humanity), and otherwise known as Okikurmi.

== Names ==
Oyna (Note: The term oyna also refers to a type of mythological song, like the yukar. Hence the qualifying the appellation as "Oyna-kamuy" or Oyna-deity serves to distinguish.) or Ae-oyna-kamuy/Ayoyna-kamuy, who in Ainu tradition is a culture hero or culture-giving deity (人文神, jinbunshin), is otherwise known by the names Ainurakkur or Okikurmi/Okikirmiy (Note: Okikorumi.) according to some sources.

Aynurakkur and Okikurmi may have originally been distinguished, but seem to have become conflated after a body of similarly plotted narratives became attached to them.

=== Etymology ===
Oyna-kamuy literally signifies "god who is passed on (in lore)" (Kindaichi) or "god of the sacred tradition, oyna" (Donald Philippi). But the name has also construed to mean "god who engages/participates in shamanism " by Chiri.

The Ae- prefix is "we", thus Ae-oyna-kamuy means "god whom we pass on (in our lore)" (Note: Kindaichi also gives renderings that are more long-winded, i.e. wareware no nagaku denshō shite wasururu bekarazu kami (我々諸人の永く伝承して忘るべからざる神, "god whom we should long pass on and never forget"), or wareware no bandai ītsugi kataritsugite wasurerarenai kami (我々の万代言い継ぎ語り継ぎて忘れられない神, "god whom we should pass on by talk and story-telling over a myriad generations and never forget").) or "god concerning whom we sing the oyna". In formal grammatical terms, Ae-oyna-kamuy has also explained as a morphological derivation with the addition of a "pronominal affix" (prefix). (Note: Kindaichi actually called it a katsuyō-kei (活用形; "conjugated form"), but conjugation applies to verbs and not nouns.)

Ainurakkur signifies "he who has a human smell". The name, which contains the element rak meaning "smells of~", is literally "human who smells like human" hence "humanlike person" according to Kindaichi. The implication is that this is a half-god, half-human (Ainu:arke ainu arke kamui) being or divinity, as explained by Kindaichi and his disciple Kubodera. (Note: Kubodera glosses the name as ningen no nioi ga suru kami (人間の匂いがする神=半神半人の神; "god who smells of human=half-god half-human deity").) While the term kur strictly means "person", various glossators take this implicitly to mean a deity, as is the case with Chiri (Note: Chiri phrases as hito kusai kami (人くさい神; lit. "god who reeks of human"), which is to be taken to mean a god who is human-like in behavior, or god upon whom human nature has rubbed off.) and others.

Okikurmi is glossed as "he (who) wears a fur/leather robe with a shiny hem" by Chiri. (Note: Chiri gives suso no kirakira suru koromo wo mi ni tsukeru kami (裾のきらきらする衣を身につける神; "god who wears a glittering-hemmed robe"); or kiki (kirakira suru) -ur (kawa goromo wo) -mi (kite iru) ("kiki (きらきらする) -ur (皮ごろもを) -mi (着ている); "wearing a glittering skin robe").) (Note: Batchelor defines term ur(u) here is defined as "skin", and Philippi gives "leather robe". But ur includes skins and of sea mammals and birds, and even fish-skin. as we as "fur" (Japanese: kegawa) or "fur coat". Also, the Japanese word kawagoromo typically denotes "fur robe".)

== Depiction ==
Ae-oyna-kamuy is described as a large man wreathed in smoke. When the smoke parts, he is seen to be surrounded by flames from his waist to his feet, and wearing a coat of elm bark and a sword. He also wields a magical spear of mugwort. The flames he is wreathed in indicate his virtuous character.

== Mythology ==
There are a number of myths of Ae-oyna-kamuy's origin, arising from different Ainu tribes. He is said to be begotten by Pakor-kamuy (パコロカムイ, the god of the year or the god of smallpox) on an elm tree (Chikisani) on Mount Oputateshike according to a version collected at Shiunkot village, while other traditions name the father as the sun or thunder.

Ae-oyna-kamuy is taught by Kamuy-huci, the hearth deity, and descends from the heavens to impart his knowledge to humanity. He is responsible for teaching weaving to the Ainu women and carving to the men. He is credited with teaching techniques of fishing, hunting, gathering, architecture, medicine, and religious ritual, and is associated with law and singing. He also fights several battles on behalf of humanity; in one instance, he destroys a personification of famine with his spear of mugwort, then creates herds of deer and schools of fish from the snow on his snowshoes.

Eventually, Ae-oyna-kamuy, disappointed at the decline of the Ainu, departs for another country; some myths say he returns to the heavens.

In one myth, when he returns to the heavens, the gods send him back because he reeks of humans. Then he leaves his clothes on earth in order to return. It is said that his old sandals turned into the first squirrels.

In this version, Aynurakkur was born between thunder deity Kannakamuy [カンナカムイ] and Princess Chikisani [チキサニ姫] who is also the spirit of Japanese Elm. In a time when animals nor humans roamed Earth, several Kamuy (Ainu deities) descended from heavens to manage and populate the barren land with life as well as defending them from malevolent entities who sought to destroy their work as they immerged from the ground. Sometimes later, Kannakamuy and the other deities who remained in heaven curiously observed the situation that was unfolding down on Earth. There, the lovely Princess Chikisani caught Kannakamuy's attention and after several courtships later, Chikisani ascended towards Kannakamuy through thunderbolt. This violent ascension proved near fatal for the princess as she then fell from the sky creating multiple explosions while being engulfed in flame. Though it was within this moment when Aynurakkur was born thus making him the very first deity born of Earth. Hearing this event, the other deities previously dispatched on to Earth quickly began the preparation for nursing Aynurakkur and built a fort high above the ground to protect both the newborn deity and Princess Chikisani. Unfortunately, the princess got reduced to charcoals after burning for six days. However, her charred remains kept on burning, forever providing warmth for Aynurakkur as solar deity Tokapchkamuy [トカプチュプカムイ] became his guardian.

As deities provided humans with language and wisdom of Nature, people abandoned their cave dwelling lifestyle and began constructing houses as well as using fire. This was also when Aynurakkur began playing with other human children which led to him creating useful tools such as bow and arrow as well as ropes. Youth On a rainy day just before Aynurakkur was about to turn 16 years old, Tokapchkamuy gave him two important directives. First, he was tasked to become the leader of humankind by vanquishing any aggressors (both human and non-human) who attempts of disrupting the peace. Second, he was destined to be the husband of Swan Princess Retacchir [白鳥姫レタッチリ] after she descended to Earth.

Rumor broke out that a giant deer terrorized the human community. This was when Aynurakkur decided to test his strength as a defender of humankind by defeating this beast. As he departed his fort to confront the beast, he by chance came across his future wife Swan Princess near the river, but Aynurakkur didn't have a moment to spare so he pressed forward. While on the trail, the giant deer presented itself and promptly attacked Aynurakkur. This was a hard battle even for Aynurakkur who was used to wrestle with deer since he was very young which were nothing like the beast he was currently facing whose body was almost twice the size of a normal stag. Nonetheless, Aynurakkur prevailed and defeated the giant deer. Then Aynurakkur sensed that this giant deer was no malevolent entity like the ones which immerged from the ground at the very beginning of time, but a divine beast sent by the deities in heavens to test Aynurakkur's strength. Alas, he venerated the giant deer and crafted an arrow which he shot upwards as the spirit of the deer rode on top; ascending to the heavens.

After defeating the giant deer, Aynurakkur met up with the Swan Princess once again, but their marry making was cut short when the evil sorceress Uesoyoma [ウエソヨマ] who was rumoured to have roamed the Earth at night kidnapped the Swan Princess. Aynurakkur fought hard to retrieve the princess at first, but the sorceress's incantation was far too powerful for him to handle. Subsequently, Aynurakkur faced his first defeat as the Swan Princess got carried down to the Underworld and the sorceress's magic blinding the hero. Upon witnessing this event, Tokapchkamuy quickly took Aynurakkur back to his fort and attended to his wounds. That same night, as Aynurakkur fully recovered with his vision also restored, he armed himself in heavy armor and a heavenly sword blessed with Kannakamuy's power that Tokapchkamuy bestowed to him in order to annihilate the evil sorceress and the rest of the malevolent entities inhabiting the Underworld as well as saving the Swan Princess who is imprisoned there. As Aynurakkur descended to the Underworld, he caught his opponents off guard and began massacring them. After defeating the great king of the Underworld and the rest of his subordinates, Aynurakkur pointed his sword high up to sky and every time he thrashed the sword downward, a massive lightning bolt struck the realm which caused the Underworld to burn for twelve days only to finally cease after everything turned to ashes.

Aynurakkur soon married the Swan Princess after rescuing her from the Underworld. Although Aynurakkur was a mighty hero deity who looked after human by eliminating every threat posed against humanity, he was not immortal and eventually, he grew old and weary. Then one day, Aynurakkur vanished as he left to a land far, far away where he presumably died. The people lamented the loss of Aynurakkur as misery began to plague the land now that he was gone. Some, however, remember what Aynurakkur told them before his departure about how he would occasionally visit the human world as lightning. Therefore, the people are reminded of Aynurakkur's presence and pray to him whenever lightning courses through the sky.
