= Hasinaw-uk-kamuy =

Ainu goddess

Hasinaw-uk-kamuy (ハシナウ・ウㇰ・カムイ; also Hash-Inau-uk Kamuy, Hashinau-uk Kamuy or simply Hash-uk Kamuy) is the Ainu kamuy (goddess) of the hunt. She is sometimes called Isosange Mat (Bringing-down-game Woman) and Kamuy Paseguru (Potent Kamuy).

== Depiction ==
Hasinaw-uk-kamuy is depicted as a woman with long hair who wields a bow and arrows, who often carries a child on her back. She is accompanied by, or sometimes appears in the form of, a small bird, which shows hunters the way to game. She is also represented by the aconite plant, with which Ainu hunters poisoned their arrows.

== Mythology ==
Hasinaw-uk-kamuy is a deity of great importance to the Ainu, who historically subsisted largely on hunting, fishing, and gathering. She was born from the fire-producing drill, and is sometimes said to be the sister of Kamuy-huci, the hearth goddess, or of Shiramba Kamuy, god of vegetation. Hunters worshipped her to assure a successful hunt, and fishermen to ensure a full catch. She is also invoked to aid in childbearing.

== See also ==
- Ainu religion
