= Kawamura Kaneto Ainu Museum =

- 川村カ子トアイヌ記念館
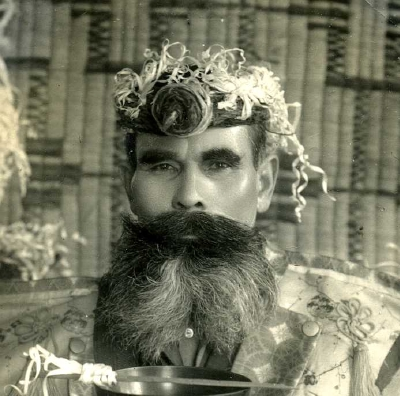
- Kawamura Kaneto
- Interactive map of the Kawamura Kaneto Ainu Museum area

General information
- Location: Asahikawa, Hokkaido, Japan
- Coordinates: 43°47′13″N 142°20′38″E
- Opened: 1916

Website
- Official website (ja)

The Kawamura Kaneto Ainu Museum (川村カ子トアイヌ記念館, Kawamura Kaneto Ainu Kinenkan) is a private museum of materials relating to the Ainu in Asahikawa, Hokkaido, Japan. The museum first opened as the Ainu museum (アイヌ博物館) in 1916. Kawamura Kaneto took over the museum from its founder, his father Kawamura Itakisiroma, and oversaw its development, before his son Kawamura Kenichi (川村兼一) took over in turn.

== See also ==
- Kayano Shigeru Nibutani Ainu Museum
- National Ainu Museum
