= Historical Museum of the Saru River =

- 沙流川歴史館
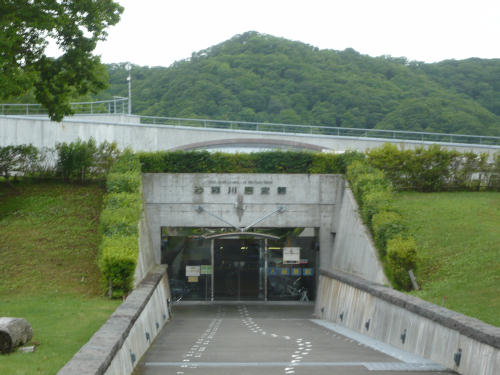
- Interactive map of the Historical Museum of the Saru River area

General information
- Location: 227-2 Nibutani, Biratori, Hokkaidō, Japan
- Coordinates: 42°38′14″N 142°09′21″E
- Opened: 1998

Website
- Official website

The Historical Museum of the Saru River (沙流川歴史館, Saru-gawa Rekishi-kan) opened in the Nibutani area of Biratori, Hokkaidō, Japan in 1998, the year after Nibutani Dam was completed. The Museum documents the natural and cultural history of life along the Saru River and has information on nearby chashi. The collection includes 123 objects dating from the fifteenth to the seventeenth centuries that were excavated from the Nibutani Site (二風谷遺跡) and have been designated a Prefectural Cultural Property. The "Cultural Landscape along the Sarugawa River resulting from Ainu Tradition and Modern Settlement" has been designated an Important Cultural Landscape.

== See also ==
- Nibutani Ainu Culture Museum
- Cultural Landscapes of Japan
- List of Historic Sites of Japan (Hokkaidō)
- Hokkaido Museum
- Ainu culture
