= Ainu Museum =

Former museum in Hokkaido, Japan

- アイヌ民族博物館
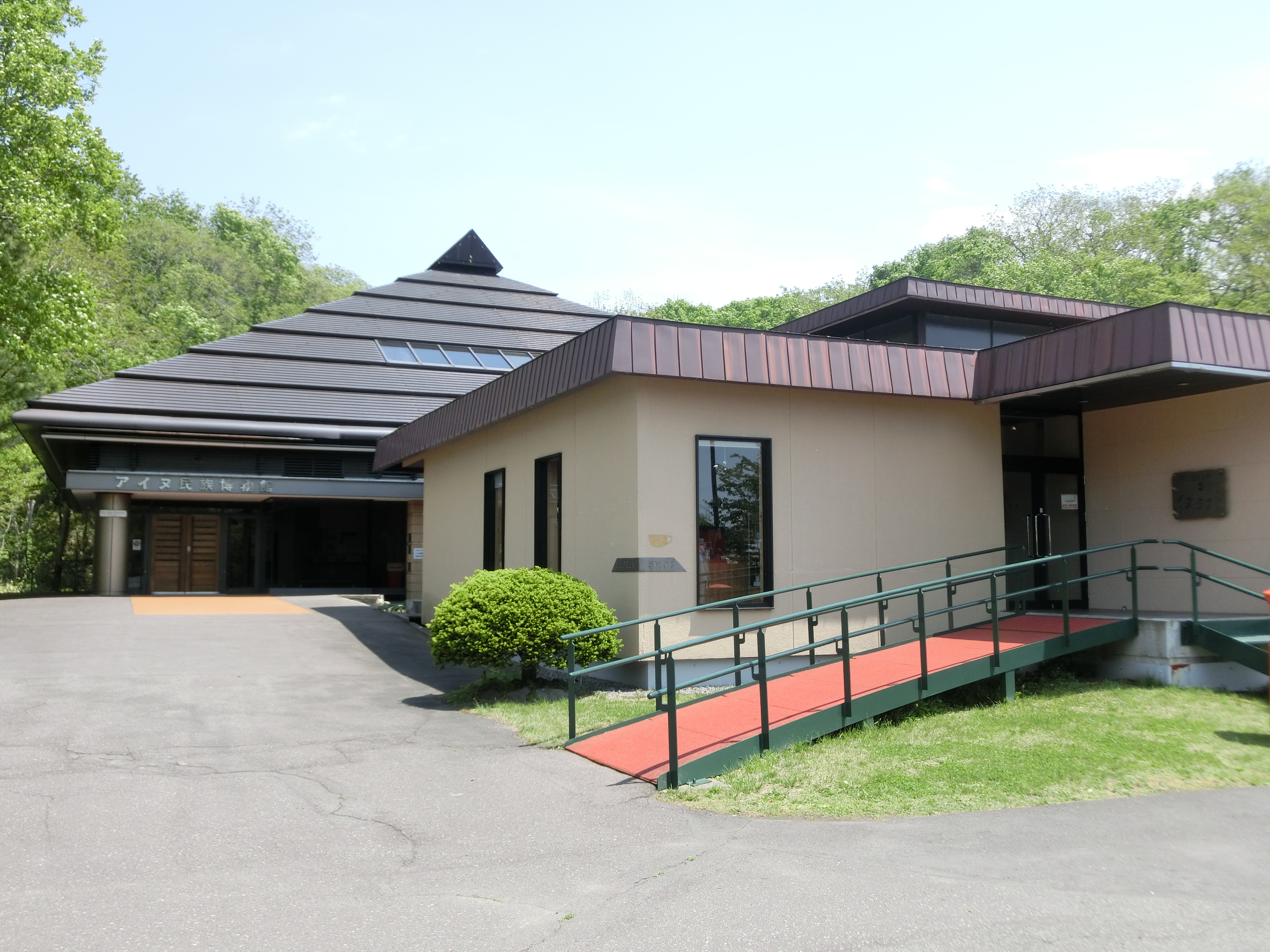
- Interactive map of the Ainu Museum area

General information
- Location: 2-3-4 Wakakusa-chō, Shiraoi, Hokkaidō, Japan
- Coordinates: 42°33′41″N 141°22′00″E
- Opened: 1984
- Closed: March 31, 2018

Website
- Official website

The Ainu Museum (アイヌ民族博物館, Ainu Minzoku Hakubutsukan), also known as Porotokotan, is a former museum in Shiraoi, Hokkaidō, Japan. The facility began its existence in 1976 as the Shiraoi Foundation for the Preservation of Ainu Culture. In 1984 this was extended to include the Ainu Folk Museum. In 1990 it reopened under the auspices of The Ainu Museum Foundation. The collection included some five thousand folk materials relating to the Ainu and a further approximately two hundred objects relating to minority groups of the north, including the Nivkh, Uilta, Sami, and Inuit. The institution was also involved in the recording and transmission of Ainu-related intangible cultural heritage. The museum closed to make way for the new National Ainu Museum on 31 March 2018.

== See also ==
- Nibutani Ainu Culture Museum
- Historical Museum of the Saru River
- Hakodate City Museum of Northern Peoples
