= National Ainu Museum =

Establishment in Shiraoi, Hokkaidō, Japan

- 国立アイヌ民族博物館
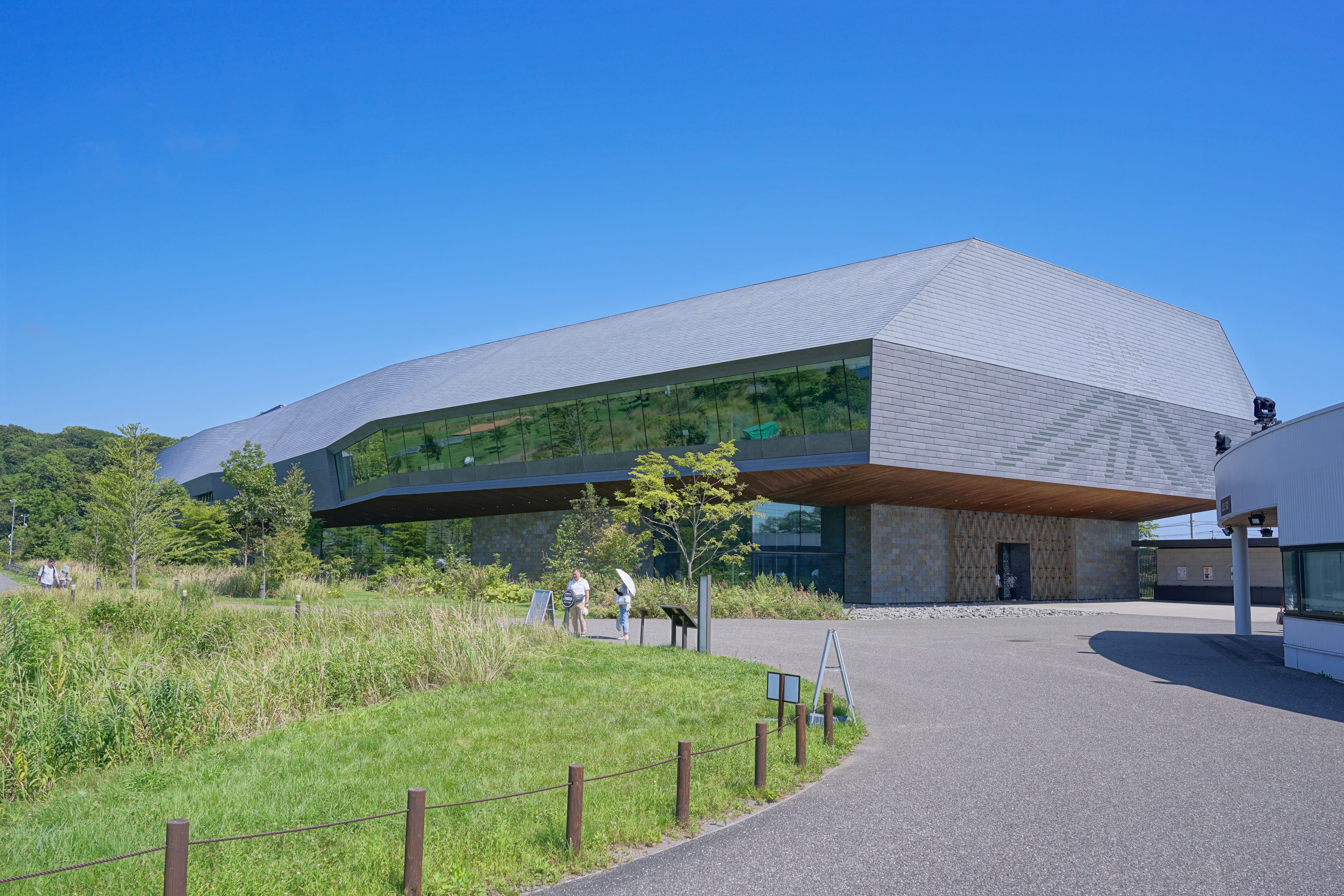
- National Ainu Museum and Park
- Interactive map of the National Ainu Museum area

General information
- Location: 2-3-4 Wakakusa-chō, Shiraoi, Hokkaidō, Japan
- Coordinates: 42°33′41″N 141°22′01″E
- Opened: 12 July 2020

Website
- Official website

The National Ainu Museum (国立アイヌ民族博物館, Kokuritsu Ainu Minzoku Hakubutsukan) is a museum located in Shiraoi, Hokkaidō, Japan. It is situated within the grounds of Upopoy (ウポポイ), a park complex that serves as a "symbolic space for ethnic harmony". The museum's mission is "to promote a proper understanding and awareness of Ainu history and culture in Japan and elsewhere out of respect for the dignity of the indigenous Ainu people, while contributing to the creation and development of new aspects of Ainu culture".

== History ==
The museum was originally scheduled to open on 24 April 2020. However, due to the COVID-19 pandemic, this was rescheduled several times. It officially opened on 12 July 2020. It serves as one of the three main facilities of Upopoy (Ainu: "singing together in a large group"), alongside the National Ainu Park and a memorial site on high ground on the east side of Lake Poroto (ポロト湖), where Ainu services are held.

The national museum supersedes and replaces the former Ainu Museum, which closed on 31 March 2018. The former museum was nestled beside a traditional Ainu village, known as a kotan. This traditional village remains in place on the west side of the grounds, for visitors to experience traditional Ainu life.

=== Timeline ===
- 2007: The United Nations General Assembly adopts the "Declaration on the Rights of Indigenous Peoples".
- 2008: The House of Representatives and House of Councilors unanimously adopt a "resolution calling for the Ainu people to be indigenous peoples".
- 2009: Proposal made for the development of a "space that symbolizes symbiosis with the people" in the report of the Advisory Panel on Ainu Policy.
- 2014: Cabinet decision made on "Basic policy on the development and management of a space that symbolizes symbiosis with the people" in Shiraoi, Hokkaido.
- 2015: The Agency for Cultural Affairs formulates the National Ainu Cultural Museum (tentative name) basic plan.
- 2016: Establishment of a public–private support network to promote exchanges that symbolize ethnic symbiosis.
- 2017: Publication of outline of the basic design of the National Ainu Museum. Designation as the operating entity of the Ainu Culture Promotion and Research Promotion Organization.
- 2018: Ainu Museum (Porotokotan) closed. Ainu Culture Promotion and Research Promotion Organization merged with Ainu Museum, with name being changed to Ainu Culture Foundation. The nickname for the symbolic space for ethnic symbiosis was decided to be "Upopoi".
- 2019 (first year of Reiwa era): Enforcement of the "Act on Promotion of Measures to Realize a Society in which the Pride of the Ainu People is Respected". Completion of memorial facility.
- 2020: Due to the COVID-19 pandemic, the commemorative ceremony was held on 11 July, after two postponements; official opening on 12 July. A TV commercial sung by KOM_I of Wednesday Campanella was aired.
- Shiraoi selected as one of the stops along the 2020 Summer Olympics torch relay route.

== Exhibits ==
Exhibits are displayed according to six principal Ainu themes: language, history, views of the world, livelihoods (hunting, gathering, fishing, farming), lifestyles (food, clothing, shelters, music, dance), and trade and exchange with surrounding peoples, including projected "multicultural coexistence" in the Japan of the future.

== Access and parking ==
The museum is located about one hour by car from Sapporo and about 40 minutes from New Chitose Airport. It has a guest parking lot.

- Get off at the Donan Bus "Upopoy Mae" bus stop
- About ten minutes on foot from the north exit of Shiraoi Station.

== Gallery ==
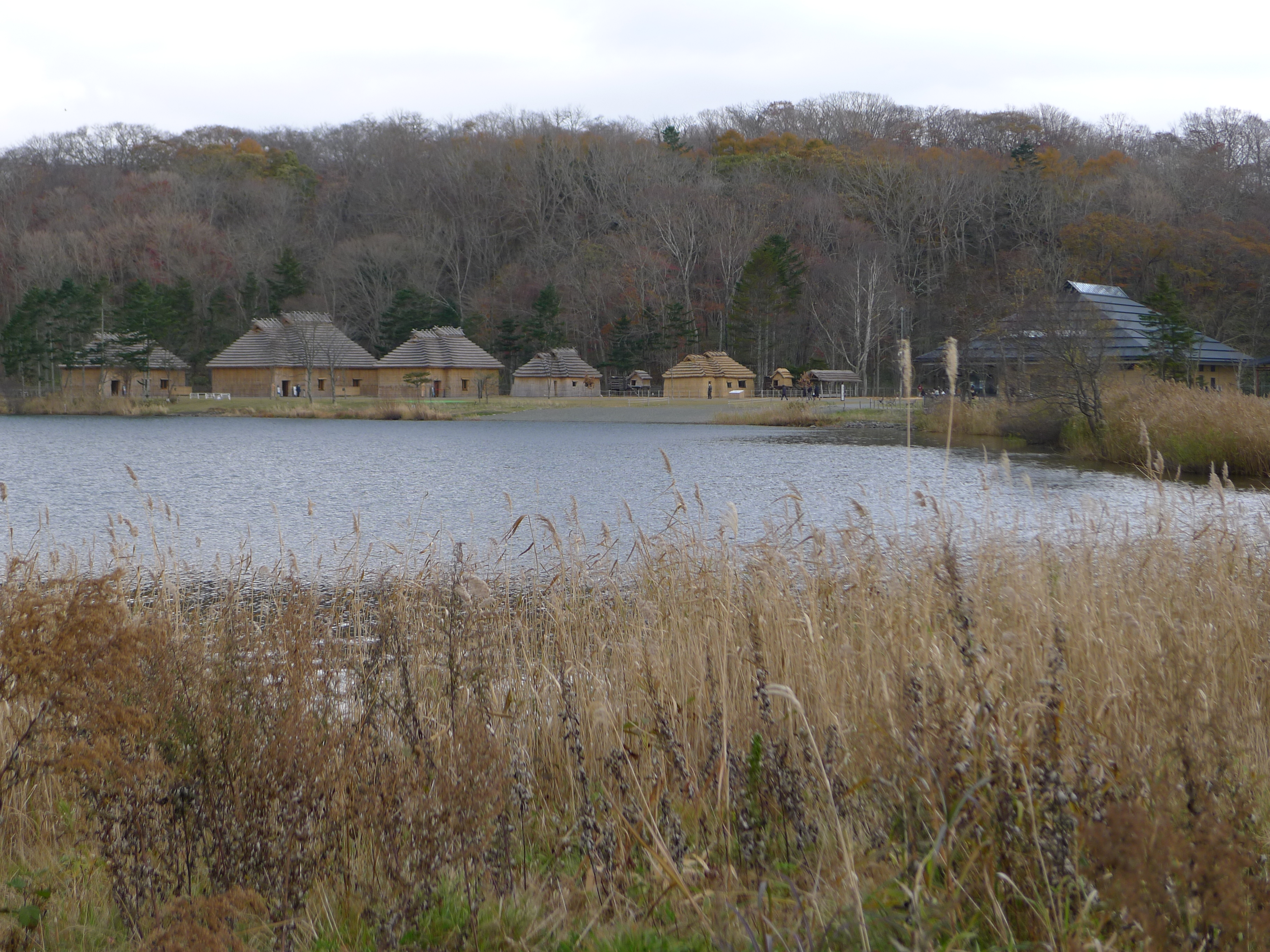
Ainu kotan (village) by Lake Poroto

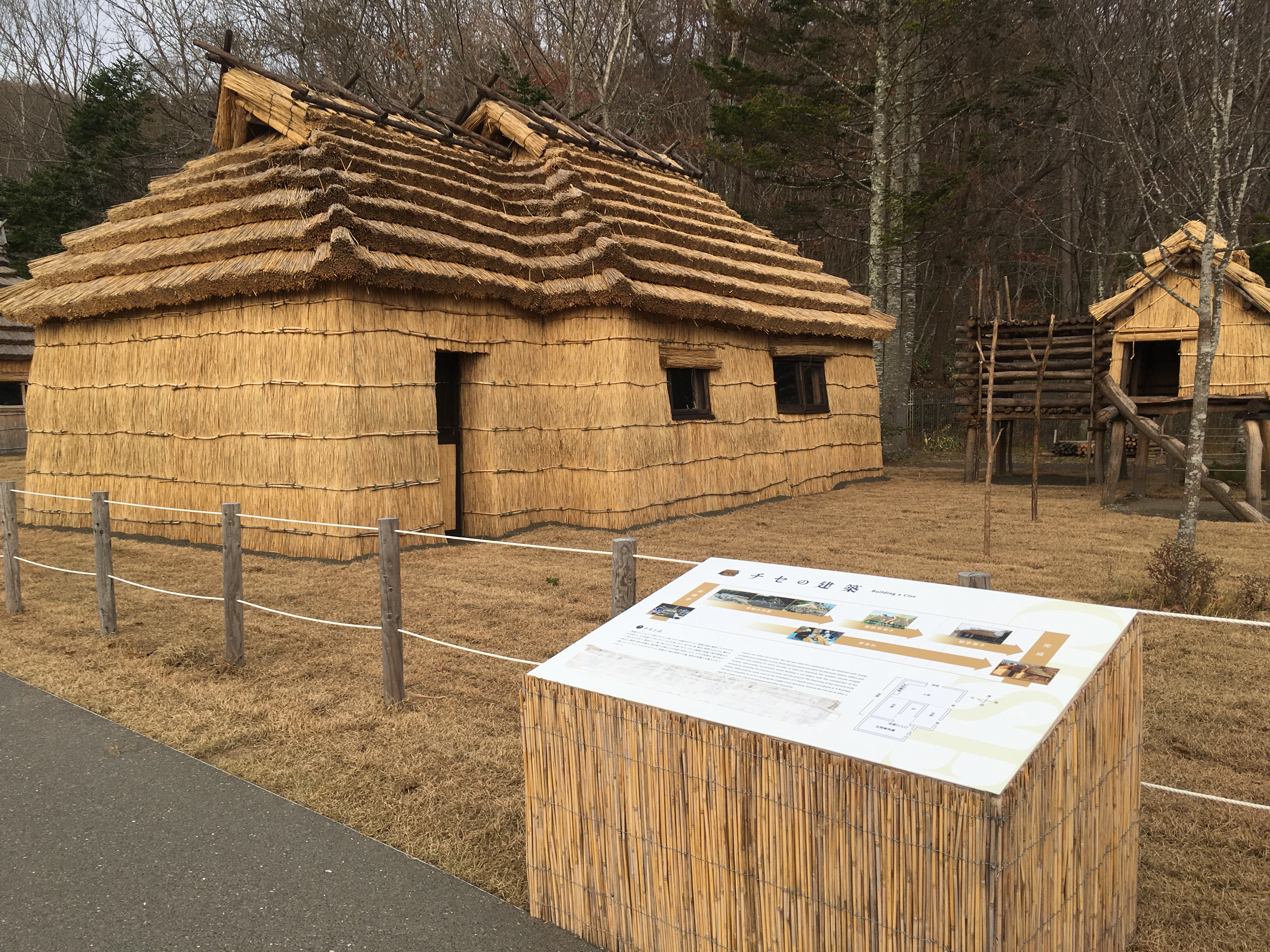
Ainu cise (hut)

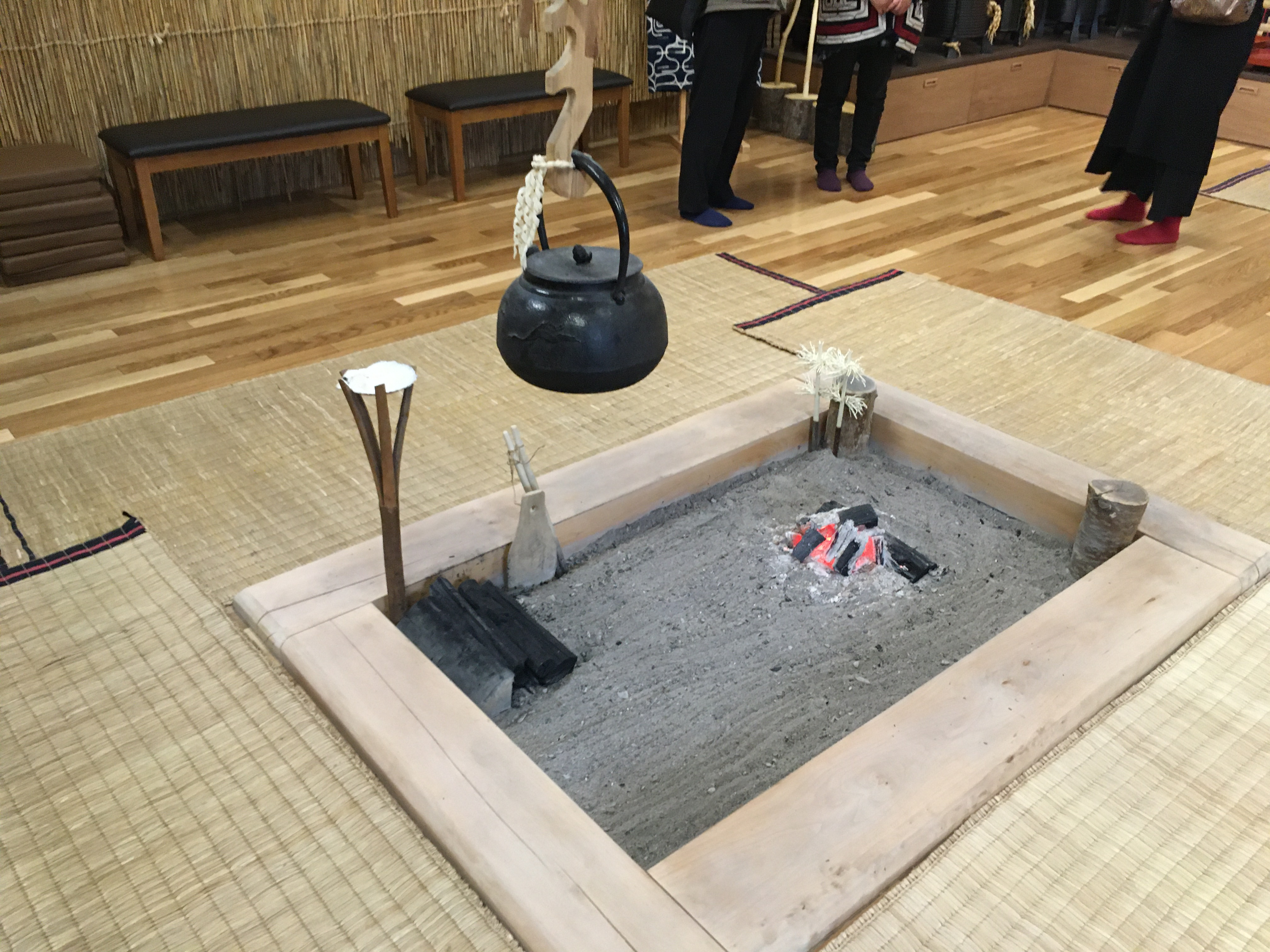
Fireplace within cise

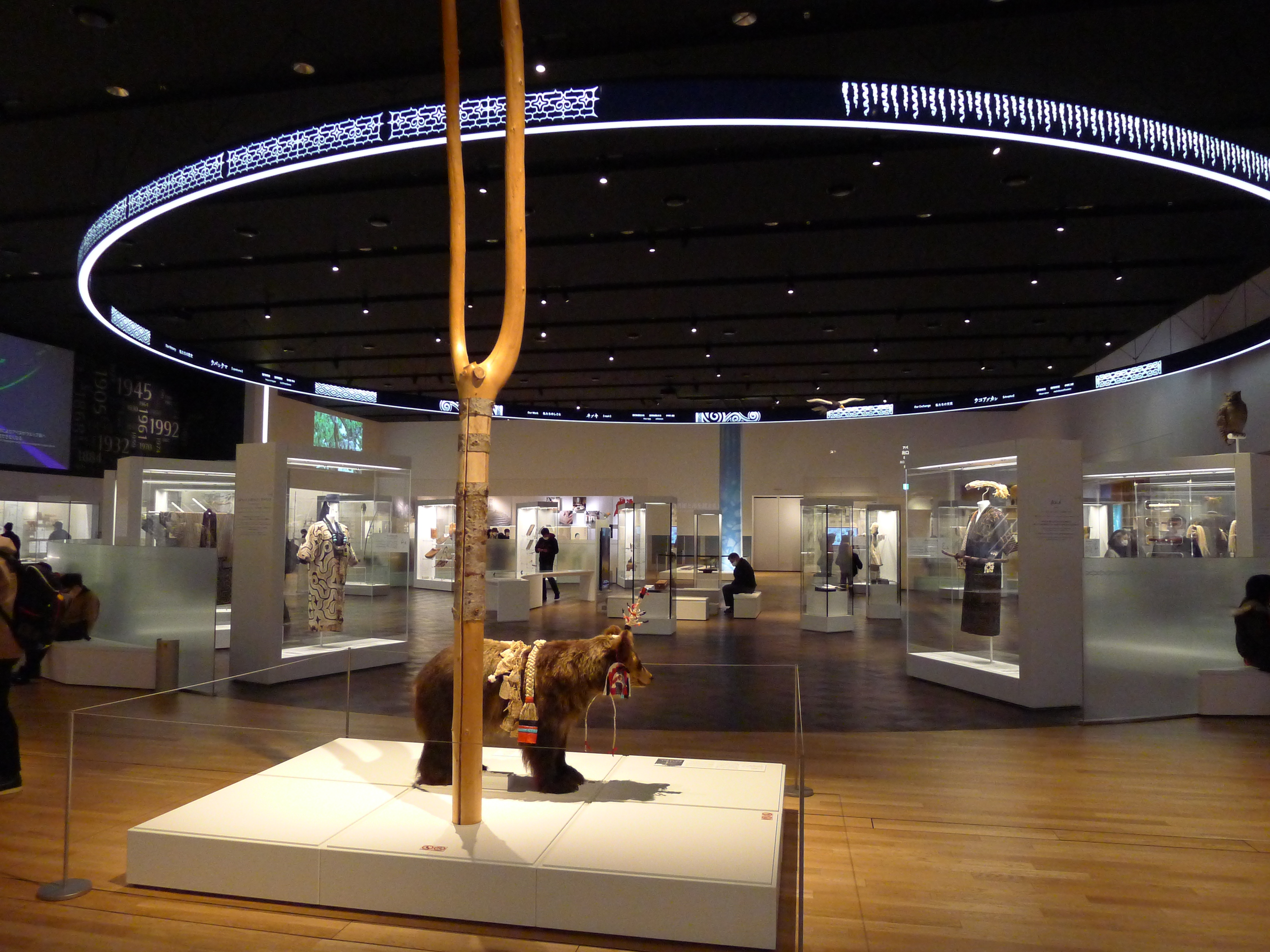
Exhibits within National Ainu Museum

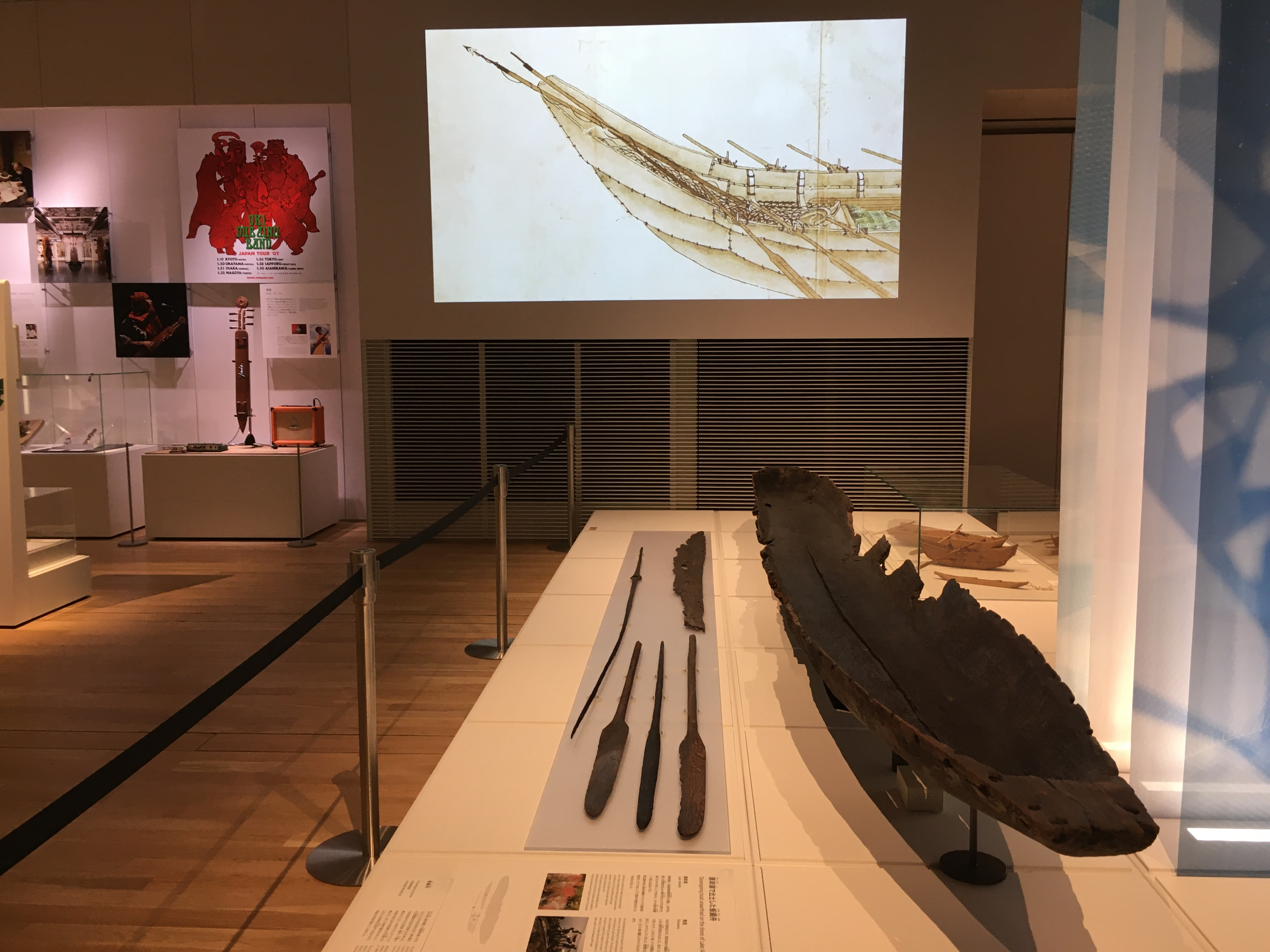

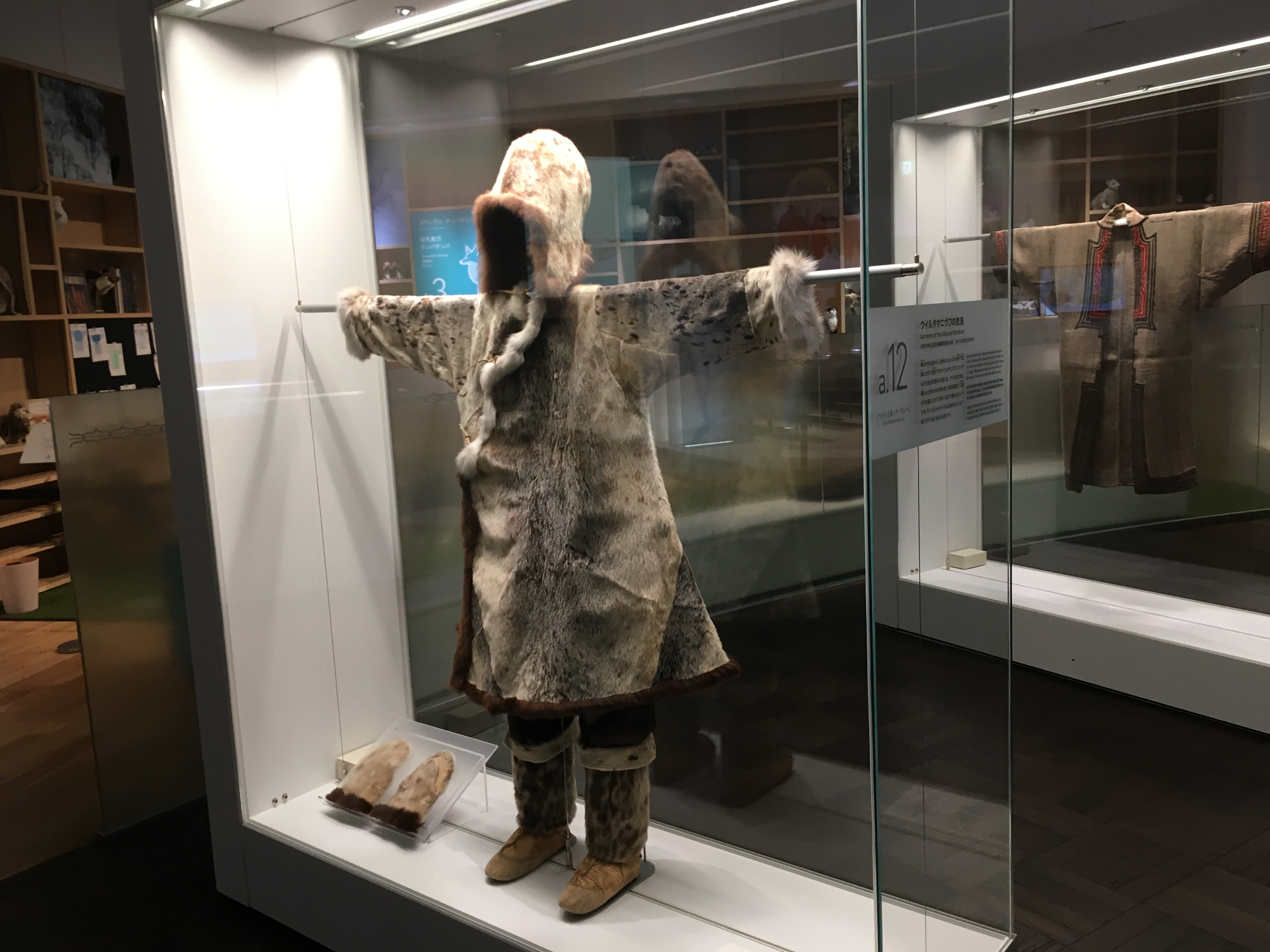

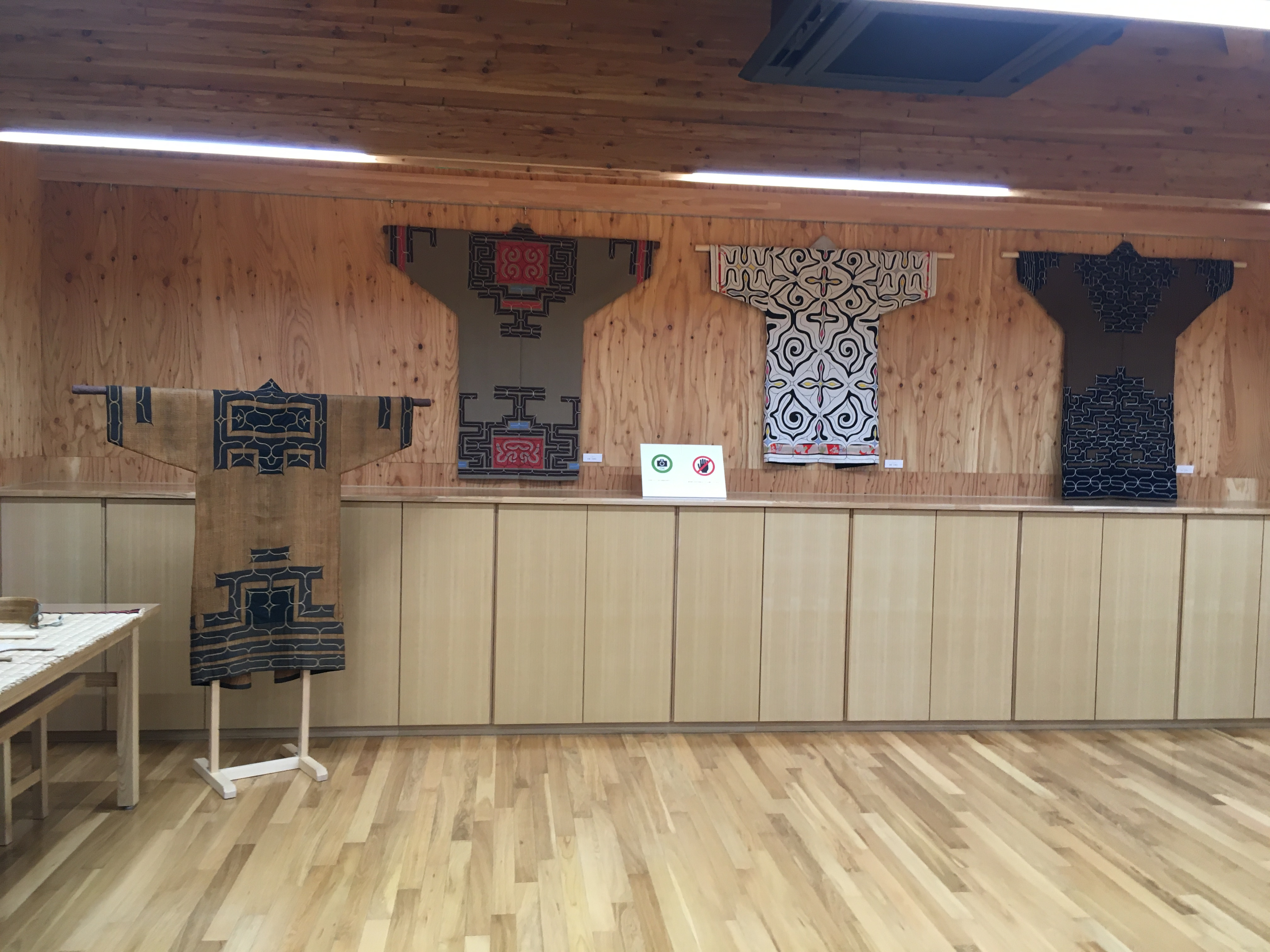

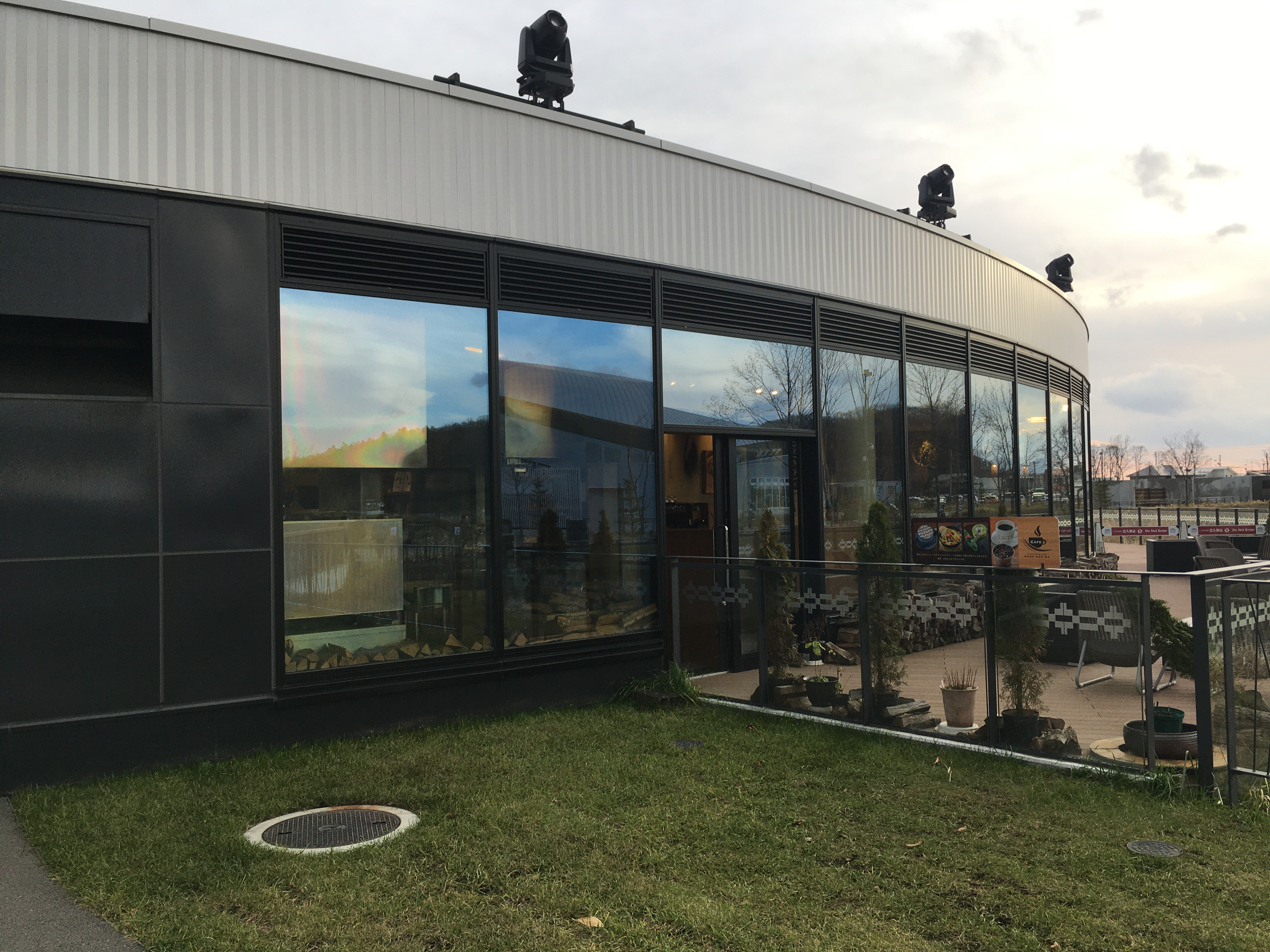

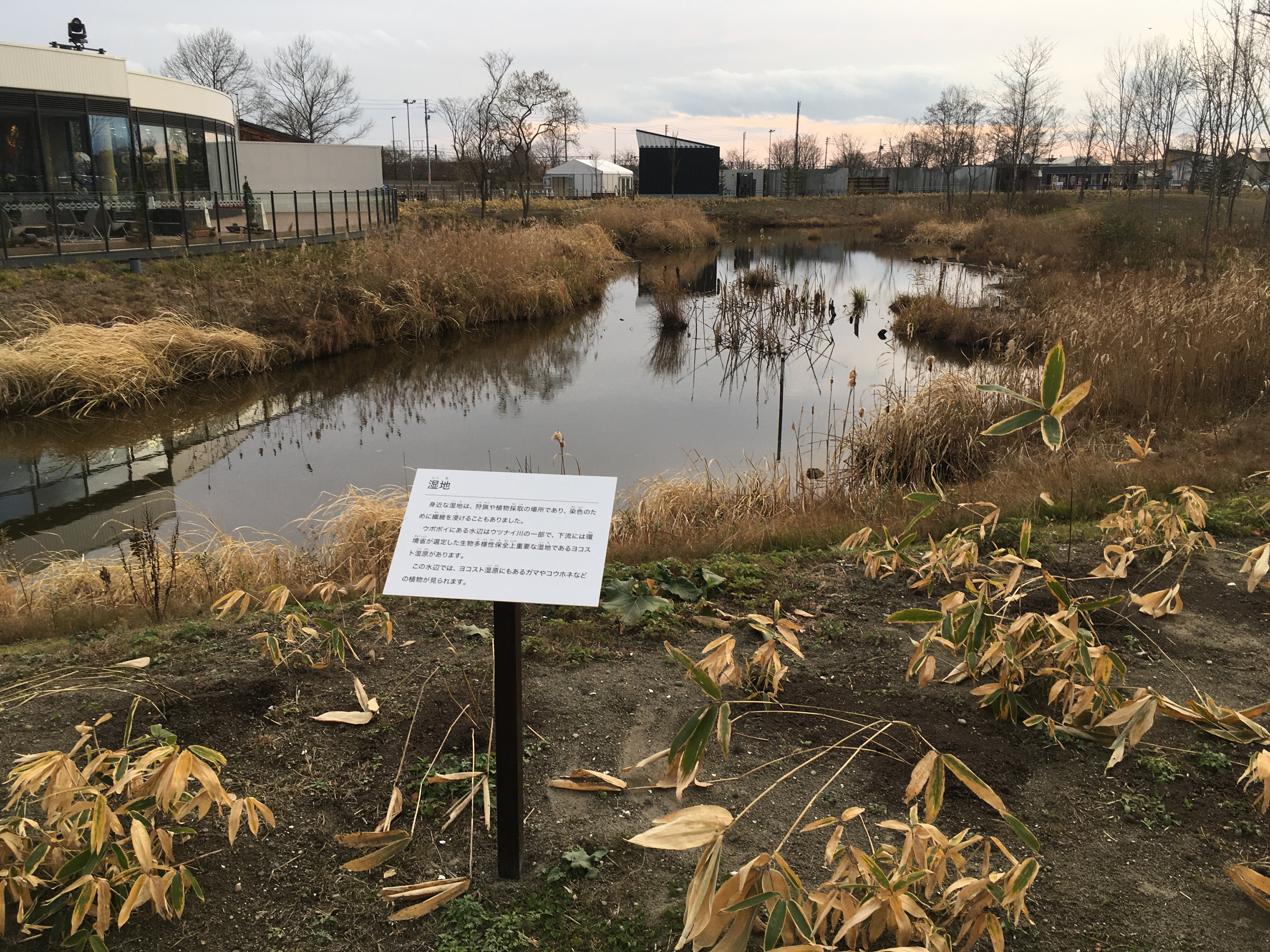

== See also ==
- Nibutani Ainu Culture Museum
- Historical Museum of the Saru River
- Hakodate City Museum of Northern Peoples
