= Seino Araida =

Japanese Ainu activist

- 新井田 セイノ
- Born: 4 April 1917; Shizunai, Hokkaido, Japan
- Died: November 2011 (aged 94)
- Occupations: Indigenous activist; folklorist

Seino Araida (新井田 セイノ, Araida Seino; 4 April 1917 – November 2011) was an Ainu activist who promoted the transmission of the kamuy yukar oral sagas and the Ainu language.

== Biography ==
Seino Araida was born on 4 April 1917 in Shizunai, Hokkaido, and moved to Mukawa, Hokkaido in 1919. Since her mother was visually impaired, she began helping with farmwork as a young child. She endured life difficulties and bullying from others, but she was encouraged by the Ainu poetry she heard from her mother while working in the fields.

In 1974, Araida joined the Hokkaido Utari Association when its Mukawa branch was established. Subsequently, she took advantage of this opportunity to commence full-scale efforts to promote the Ainu language and kamuy yukar, which had been handed down in the Mukawa region. In 1980, she was involved in the establishment of the Mukawa Ainu Cultural Tradition Preservation Association. She was also active as a community leader, and in 1992 she began serving as a lecturer at the Mukawa Ainu Language School.

Araida was especially skilled at the yukar "Ape Fuchi Kamui", which was about the joy of God helping her husband, and had a reputation for the beauty of her pronunciation. In addition, she actively worked on the tradition and preservation of the Ainu language in various places, such as reading kamuy yukar at the "Kamuy Yukar no Yūbe" event sponsored by the Ainu Museum in Shiraoi, Hokkaido. She often participated in traditional Ainu dance performances and cooperated with independent research on Ainu culture, including the Hokkaidō Prefectural Board of Education's 1988 report on the local folklore of the Mukawa and Usu areas. She also worked at the Mukawa Town Living Center teaching an Ainu cooking class.

In 1995, Araida was made a Person of Merit of the Protection of Cultural Properties of Hokkaido, and awarded the Mukawa Cultural Award. In 2001, she was awarded the Ainu Culture Award for her role in promoting Ainu culture and her activities in the Mukawa Ainu Cultural Tradition Preservation Society. Local officials reportedly described her as "Mukawa's treasure". Even at such an advanced age, she was still contributing to the promotion of Ainu culture.

Araida died in November 2011, aged 94. The Ainu Museum described her as a "great contributor to the promotion of Ainu culture". Her younger sister Fuyuko Yoshimura also became an Ainu culture promoter.
