= Kayano Shigeru Nibutani Ainu Museum =

- 萱野茂二風谷アイヌ資料館
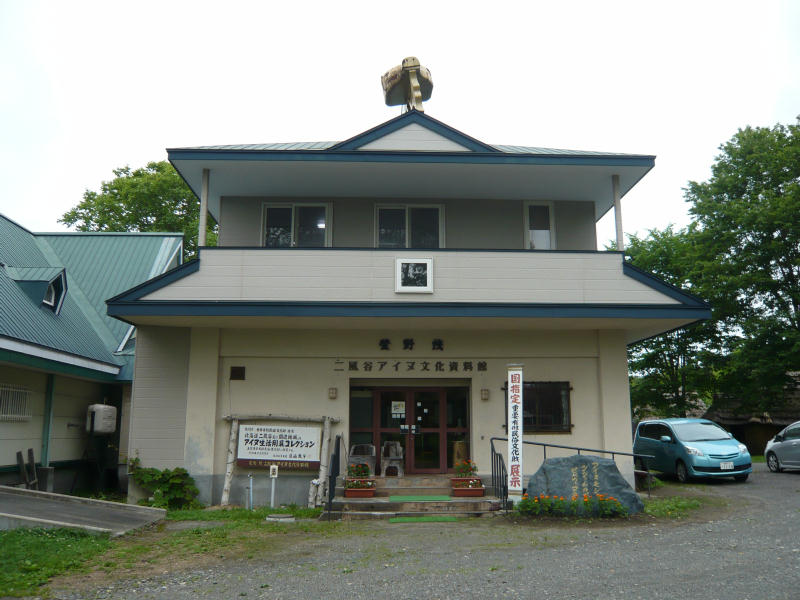

- Location within Hokkaido Location within Japan

General information
- Location: 79 Nibutani, Biratori, Hokkaidō, Japan
- Coordinates: 42°38′07″N 142°09′41″E
- Opened: March 1992

Website
- Official website

The Kayano Shigeru Nibutani Ainu Museum (萱野茂二風谷アイヌ資料館, Kayano Shigeru Nibutani Ainu Shiryōkan) is a private museum of Ainu materials collected by Kayano Shigeru that opened in the Nibutani area of Biratori, Hokkaidō, Japan in 1992.

== History ==
Kayano Shigeru (1926–2006) started collecting tools and other items used in traditional Ainu daily life in 1952. In 1972 the Nibutani Ainu Bunka Shiryōkan (二風谷アイヌ文化資料館) opened in the building that now serves as the Kayano Shigeru Nibutani Ainu Museum, with some two thousand objects he had acquired. When the Nibutani Ainu Culture Museum opened a short distance away in 1992, the collection of the old museum was transferred in its entirety to the new museum, and the old building repurposed as a private museum for his rebuilt personal collection. By March 2003, the museum had some 4,000 objects. 202 of these, along with 919 items from the Nibutani Ainu Culture Museum, all relating to the daily life of the local Ainu, have together been designated an Important Tangible Folk Cultural Property.

== See also ==
- Historical Museum of the Saru River
- List of Important Tangible Folk Cultural Properties
- List of Historic Sites of Japan (Hokkaidō)
- Hokkaido Museum
- Ainu culture
