= Kayano Shigeru =

Ainu politician of Japan (1926–2006)

- 萱野 茂

Member of the House of Councillors
- In office 5 August 1994 – 25 July 1998
- Preceded by: Eiichi Matsumoto
- Succeeded by: Multi-member district
- Constituency: National PR

Member of the Biratori Town Council
- In office 1975–1994

Personal details
- Born: 15 June 1926 Biratori, Hokkaido, Japan
- Died: 6 May 2006 (aged 79) Sapporo, Hokkaido, Japan
- Party: Democratic (1998–2006)
- Other political affiliations: JSP (1992–1996); SDP (1996); DP (1996–1998)
- Awards: Yoshikawa Eiji Cultural Award (1989); Order of the Sacred Treasure third class (2001)

Kayano Shigeru (萱野 茂, Kayano Shigeru; 15 June 1926 – 6 May 2006) was a Japanese politician and a leading figure in the Ainu ethnic movement in Japan. He was one of the last speakers of the Ainu language.

== Early life ==
Kayano was born in Nibutani village in Biratori, Hokkaido, Japan. His family name at birth was Kaizawa, but he was adopted out by name to his aunt's family. He was raised in poverty by his alcoholic father and devout Buddhist mother, and gained his first appreciation of Ainu culture from his grandmother, Tekatte, who would share traditional stories in Ainu with him.

== Cultural leader ==
Though he did not reach a high level of formal education, he undertook an impassioned study of Ainu folklore, art, language and history. He successfully led efforts to record Ainu religious practices. His activism helped bring about the founding of the Nibutani Ainu Culture Museum in 1972. He was an acknowledged living master of the Ainu oral tradition, an expert in its folk arts and language, having collected hundreds of tales and artefacts and publishing multiple books on the topics. He led the effort to found 15 Ainu language schools.

== Political career ==
He served five terms in the Biratori Town Council before winning a seat in the House of Councillors for the Japan Socialist Party. There he served from 1994 to 1998 and he was the first Ainu politician to sit in the Diet of Japan. In the Diet, he often posed questions in the Ainu language.

Kayano Shigeru was also known for leading the protest movement against the Nibutani Dam. The dam over the Saru River, completed in 1997 despite legal attempts to stop it, flooded land sacred to the Ainu. Though unsuccessful, the legal effort did result in a ruling by the Sapporo District Court, acknowledging the Ainu as the indigenous people of Hokkaidō for the first time. He also succeeded in his quest for abolition of Hokkaido Former Aborigines Protection Act (北海道旧土人保護法公布) and enacting the Act for the Promotion of Ainu Culture & Dissemination of Knowledge Regarding Ainu Traditions in 1997. In 2001 he was awarded the Order of the Sacred Treasure third class. He died of pneumonia at a hospital in Sapporo, Hokkaidō on 6 May 2006, just over a month short of his 80th birthday.

== Works ==
Kayano Shigeru has written about 100 books about the Ainu language and culture, including 28 yukar collections. Some of his works were translated into English:

- The Ainu and the Fox – 2006
- The Ainu: A Story of Japan's Original People – 2004
- Our Land was a Forest: an Ainu Memoir – 1994
- Yukar, the Ainu Epic and Folktales – 1988
- The Romance of the Bear God – 1985
