= Kawamura Itakisiroma =

- 川村 イタキシロマ
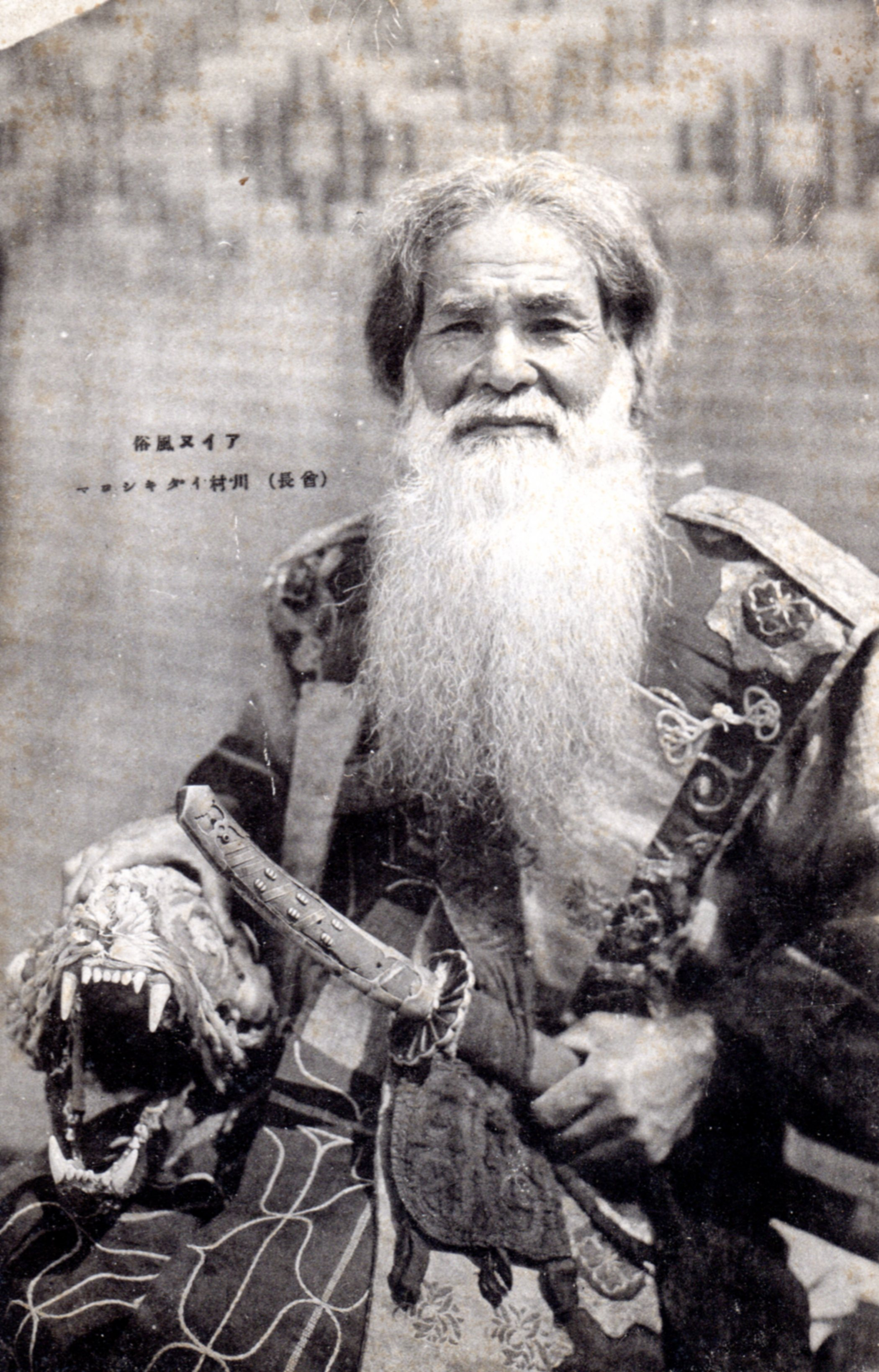
- Kawamura in 1937

Personal details
- Born: Unknown Bihoro, Hokkaidō, Japan
- Died: 1943 Asahikawa, Hokkaidō, Japan

Kawamura Itakisiroma (Japanese: 川村 イタキシロマ; d. 1943) was a Japanese Ainu chief.

== Biography ==
His year of birth is unknown. He was the head of an Ainu family that had migrated from Bihoro to a village (kotan) along the Ishikari River near Asahikawa. He later became chief of the kotan. The Ainu name "Itakisiroma" translates to "[his] words are weighty".

In 1876, he adopted the Japanese surname "Kawamura" (川村; lit. 'river village') because he lived on the banks of the Ishikari River. In 1887, he was ordered to move by the Kaitakushi and relocated to the nearby kotan of Chikabumi (近文).

In 1916, Kawamura constructed a building near his house in Chikabumi to display his collection of Ainu cultural artifacts. This building served as the precursor to the present-day Kawamura Kaneto Ainu Museum. Ownership of the museum was later taken over by his son, Kawamura Kaneto. Around 1931, Kawamura contributed an essay on ikupasuy to the Journal of the Anthropological Society of Japan.

Kawamura died in 1943.

== See also ==
- Hiramura Penriuk
- Benkai Takojirō
