= Monbetsu, Hokkaido (Hidaka) =

Dissolved municipality in Saru district, Hokkaidō, Japan

Monbetsu 門別町 もんべつちょう
- Town
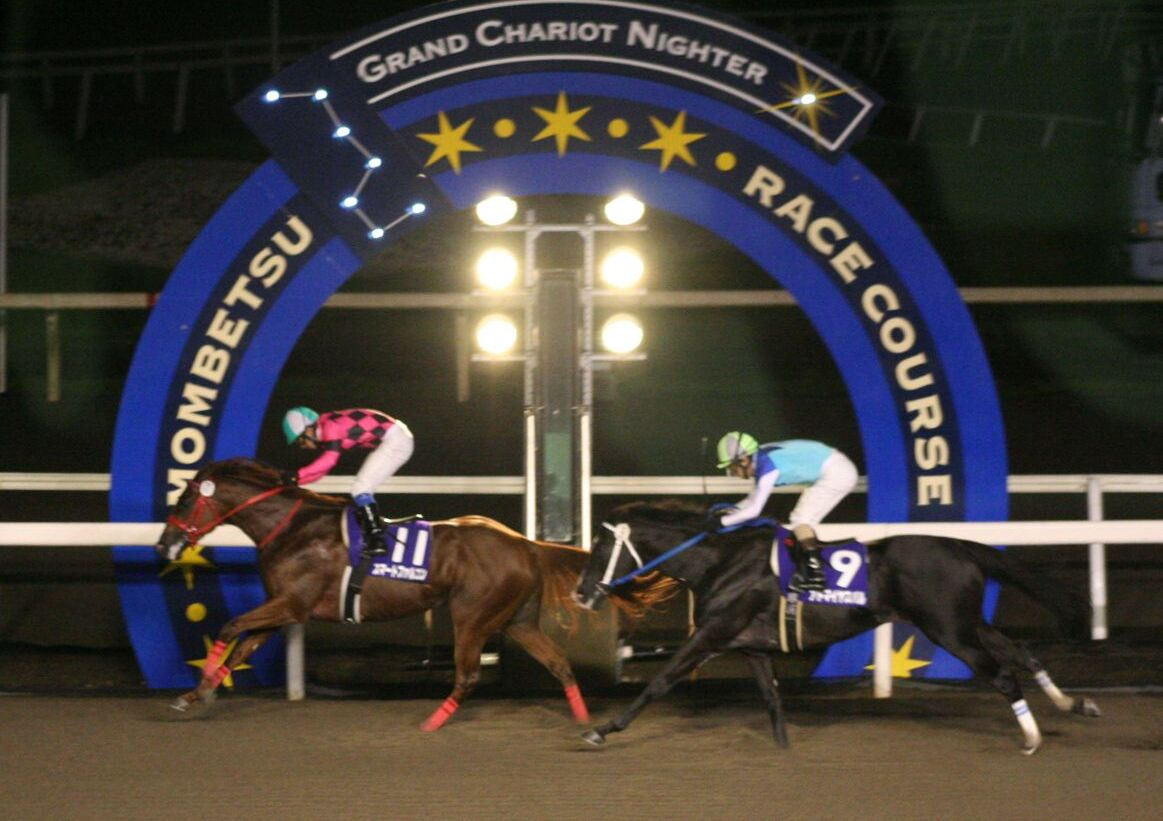
- Breeder's Gold Cup race at Monbetsu

- Flag Seal
- Interactive map of Monbetsu
- Country: Japan
- Region: Hokkaido
- Prefecture: Hokkaido
- Subprefecture: Hidaka
- District: Saur

Area
  - Total: 428.73 km^{2} (165.53 sq mi)

Population (2004)
  - Total: 12,836
  - Density: 29.940/km^{2} (77.543/sq mi)

Monbetsu (門別町, Monbetsu-chō) was a town located in Saru District, Hidaka Subprefecture, Hokkaido, Japan.

On March 1, 2006, Monbetsu was merged into the expanded town of Hidaka.

As of 2004, the town had an estimated population of 12,836 and a density of 29.94 persons per km^{2}. The total area was 428.73 km^{2}.

== Climate ==
Climate data for Monbetsu (1991−2020 normals, extremes 1976−present)
Month	Jan	Feb	Mar	Apr	May	Jun	Jul	Aug	Sep	Oct	Nov	Dec	Year
Record high °C (°F)	9.5 (49.1)	8.7 (47.7)	14.3 (57.7)	20.4 (68.7)	25.7 (78.3)	31.3 (88.3)	32.2 (90.0)	32.1 (89.8)	29.8 (85.6)	23.4 (74.1)	19.1 (66.4)	15.6 (60.1)	32.2 (90.0)
Mean daily maximum °C (°F)	0.0 (32.0)	0.6 (33.1)	4.3 (39.7)	9.9 (49.8)	15.0 (59.0)	18.4 (65.1)	22.1 (71.8)	24.1 (75.4)	21.8 (71.2)	16.0 (60.8)	9.1 (48.4)	2.5 (36.5)	12.0 (53.6)
Daily mean °C (°F)	−4.9 (23.2)	−4.3 (24.3)	0.1 (32.2)	5.3 (41.5)	10.5 (50.9)	14.5 (58.1)	18.6 (65.5)	20.5 (68.9)	17.3 (63.1)	10.9 (51.6)	4.4 (39.9)	−2.1 (28.2)	7.6 (45.6)
Mean daily minimum °C (°F)	−10.3 (13.5)	−10.0 (14.0)	−4.6 (23.7)	0.6 (33.1)	6.1 (43.0)	11.1 (52.0)	15.8 (60.4)	17.4 (63.3)	12.8 (55.0)	5.6 (42.1)	−0.5 (31.1)	−6.9 (19.6)	3.1 (37.6)
Record low °C (°F)	−22.7 (−8.9)	−23.4 (−10.1)	−20.7 (−5.3)	−11.5 (11.3)	−2.6 (27.3)	2.8 (37.0)	6.8 (44.2)	8.7 (47.7)	1.7 (35.1)	−3.9 (25.0)	−11.9 (10.6)	−20.1 (−4.2)	−23.4 (−10.1)
Average precipitation mm (inches)	25.2 (0.99)	24.0 (0.94)	38.3 (1.51)	65.7 (2.59)	97.1 (3.82)	87.0 (3.43)	130.7 (5.15)	178.5 (7.03)	127.3 (5.01)	93.8 (3.69)	73.0 (2.87)	43.3 (1.70)	983.7 (38.73)
Average rainy days	6.5	6.1	7.1	9.4	9.9	8.8	10.2	10.6	10.5	10.2	10.1	8.2	107.6
Mean monthly sunshine hours	142.0	152.0	186.8	179.3	185.4	154.6	122.3	140.3	166.9	164.6	126.5	118.7	1,839.3
Source 1: JMA
Source 2: JMA
