= Biratori =

Town in Japan

Biratori 平取町 Biratori-chō
- Town
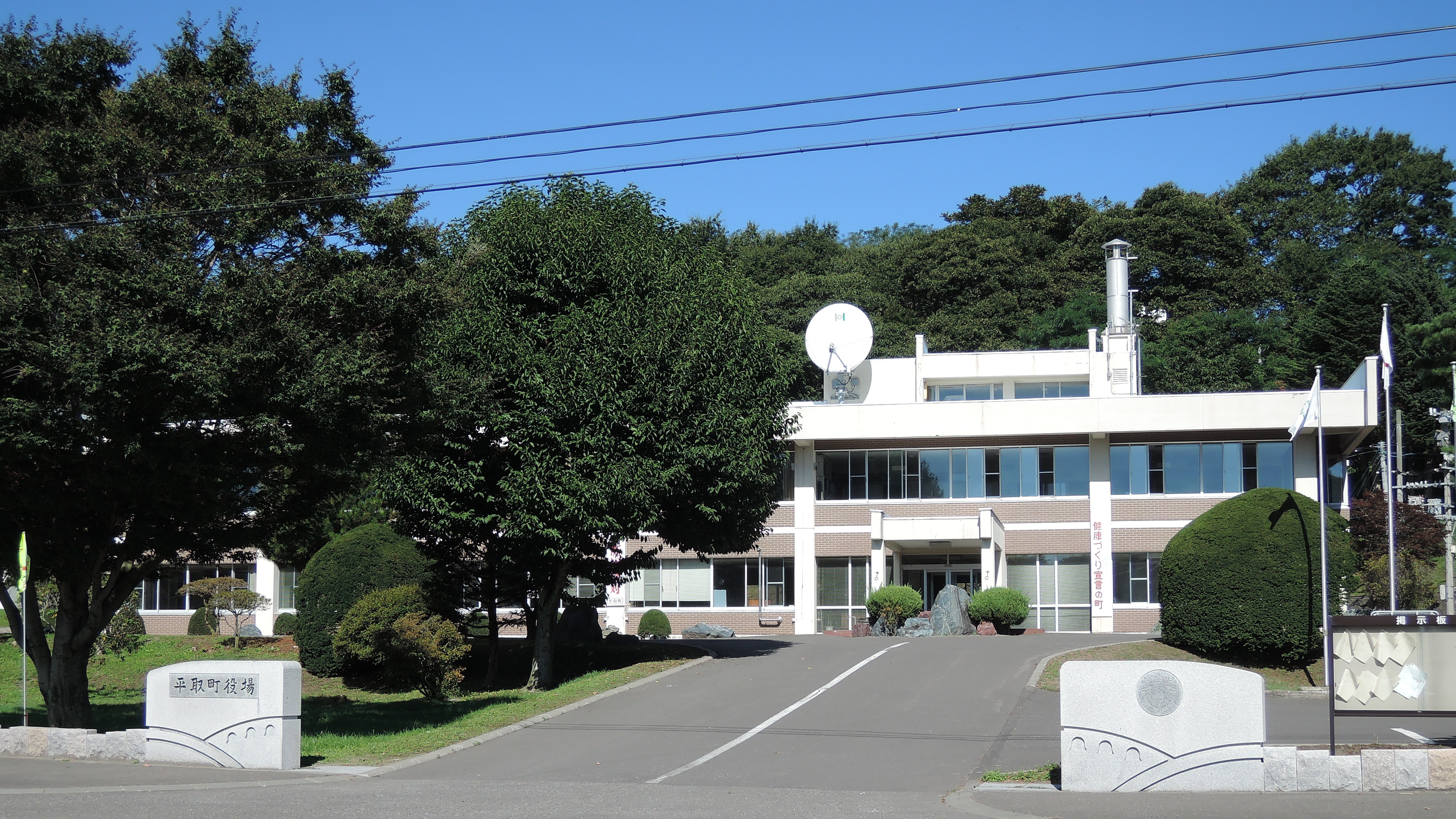
- Biratori Town Hall

- Flag Emblem

- Location of Biratori in Hokkaido (Tokachi Subprefecture)

- Coordinates: 42°35′06″N 142°07′43″E
- Country: Japan
- Region: Hokkaido
- Prefecture: Hokkaido (Hidaka Subprefecture)
- District: Saru

Area
  - Total: 743.09 km^{2} (286.91 sq mi)

Population (December 31, 2025)
  - Total: 4,361
  - Density: 5.869/km^{2} (15.20/sq mi)
- Time zone: UTC+09:00 (JST)
- City hall address: 28, Honchō, Biratori-chō, Saru-gun, Hokkaidō 055-0192
- Climate: Dfb
- Website: www.town.biratori.hokkaido.jp/index.html
- Symbols
- Bird: Great spotted woodpecker
- Flower: Lily of the Valley
- Mascot: Bilicky (ビラッキー)
- Tree: Katsura (Cercidiphyllum japonicum)

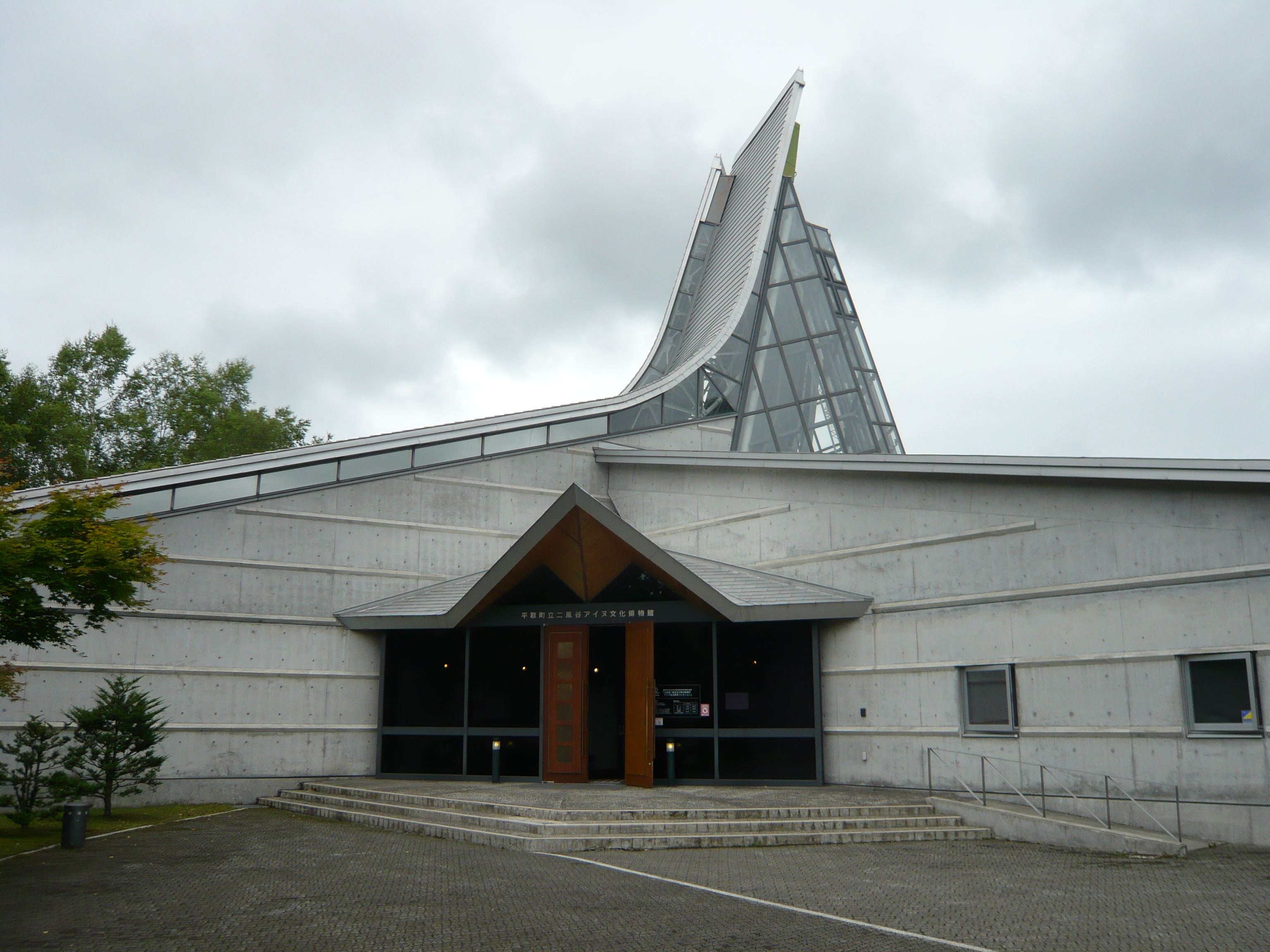
Nibutani Ainu Culture Museum

Biratori (平取町, Biratori-chō) (Ainu: ピラ・ウトゥル, romanized: pira-utur) is a town located in Hidaka Subprefecture, Hokkaidō, Japan. As of 31 December 2025, the town had an estimated population of 4,361 in 2374 households, and a population density of 5 people per km^{2}. The total area of the town is 743.09 km^{2} (286.91 sq mi). The name of the town means 'between the rocky cliffs' in the Ainu language.

== Geography ==
Biratori is located in southern Hokkaido in the mountainous western part of the Hidaka Subprefecture. The mountainous area originating from the Hidaka Mountains in the east and the forested area surrounding Mount Nukibetsu (2053 meters) are part of the Hidakasanmyaku-Erimo-Tokachi National Park .

=== Neighboring municipalities ===
- Hidaka
- Niikappu
- Obihiro
- Mukawa
- Shimukappu

=== Climate ===
According to the Köppen climate classification, Biratori has a humid continental climate. It has large temperature differences, including large annual and daily temperature ranges. It receives a lot of snow, and is designated as a heavy snow area. In winter, temperatures below -20 °C are not uncommon, making it extremely cold.

=== Demographics ===
Per Japanese census data, the population of Biratori has declined in recent decades.

Historical population
Year	Pop.	±%
1970	10,770	—
1980	8,494	−21.1%
1990	7,352	−13.4%
2000	6,503	−11.5%
2010	5,597	−13.9%
2020	4,776	−14.7%

== History ==
The area of Biratori was organized into a village in 1923 under the second-class town and village system, and became a town in 1954. Merger negotiations with other municipalities in the Hidaka Subprefecture collapsed in 2004.

== Ainu culture ==
The Nibutani Dam was constructed in Nibutani (二風谷) district on the Saru River, though there was a strong objection due to a sacred meaning of the place for indigenous Ainu people. Nibutani is the site of the Ainu Cultural center. Nibutani's best known son is perhaps Shigeru Kayano, a 20th-century advocate for the Ainu people and Ainu language and culture. The cultural landscape along the Saru, consisting of Ainu traditions and modern settlement within Biratori, has been designated an Important Cultural Landscape.

== Government ==
Biratori has a mayor-council form of government with a directly elected mayor and a unicameral town council of nine members. Biratori, as part of Hidaka Subprefecture, contributes two members to the Hokkaidō Prefectural Assembly. In terms of national politics, the town is part of the Hokkaidō 9th district of the lower house of the Diet of Japan.

== Economy ==
The local economy is overwhelmingly agricultural. Biratori Wagyu beef and tomato (Nishipa's Lover) are local specialities.

== Education ==
Biratori has five public elementary schools and two public middle school operated by the town. The town one public high school an done special education school operated by the Hokkaido Board of Education.

== Transportation ==
=== Railways ===
Biratori has not had any passenger rail service since the discontinuation of the Japanese National Railways Tomiuchi Line in 1986.

=== Highways ===
- National Route 237

== Local attractions ==
- Nibutani Ainu Culture Museum
- Kayano Shigeru Nibutani Ainu Museum
- Yoshitsune Jinja
- Biratori Onsen
- Suzuran Field in Memu, where Lily of the Valley (also known as Maybells) bloom from May to June. The field covers 15 hectares and is the largest in Japan. It opened to the public in 1963, but had to be closed in 1975 due to damage from overpicking and trampling. It was able to open again ten years later..
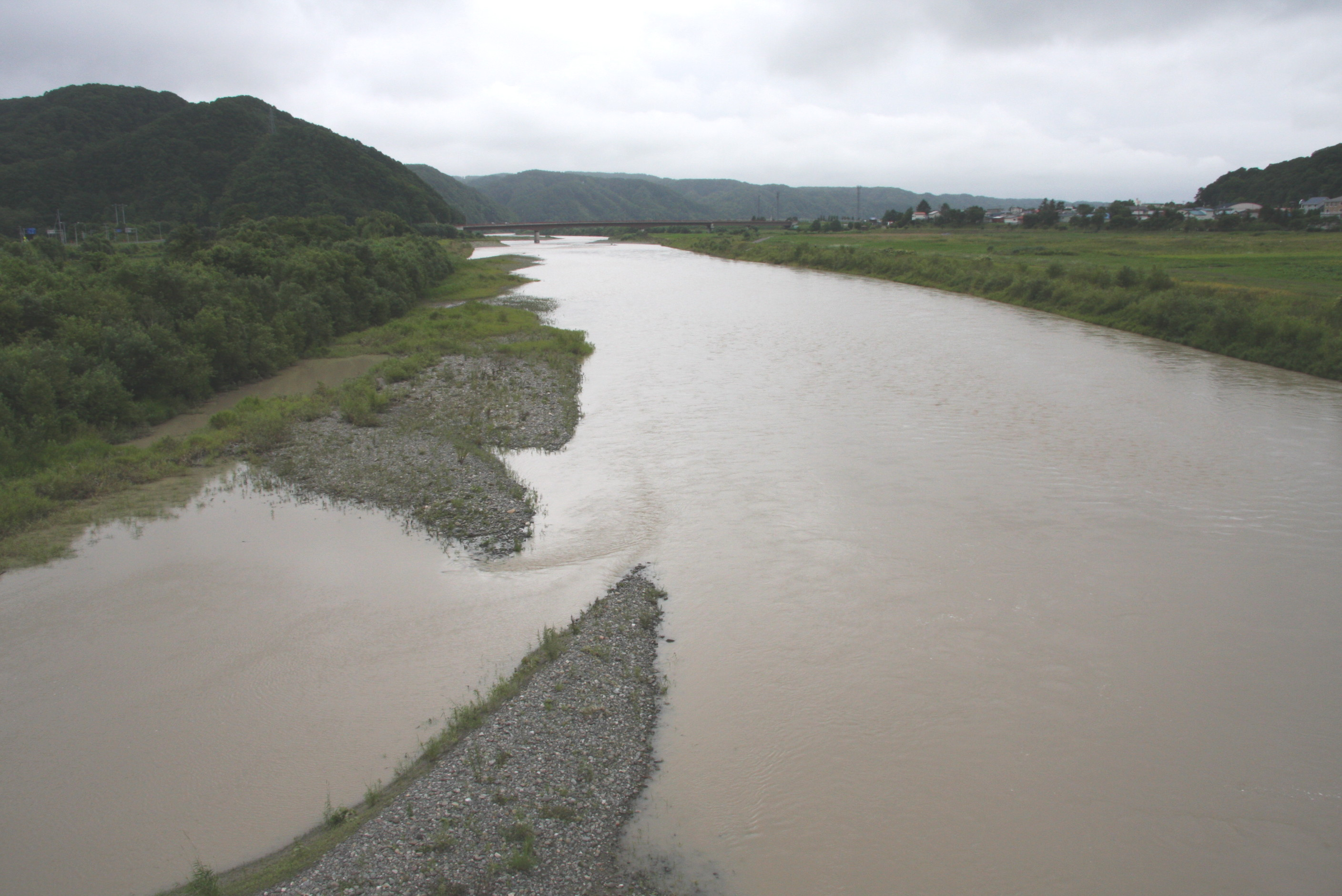
Saru River

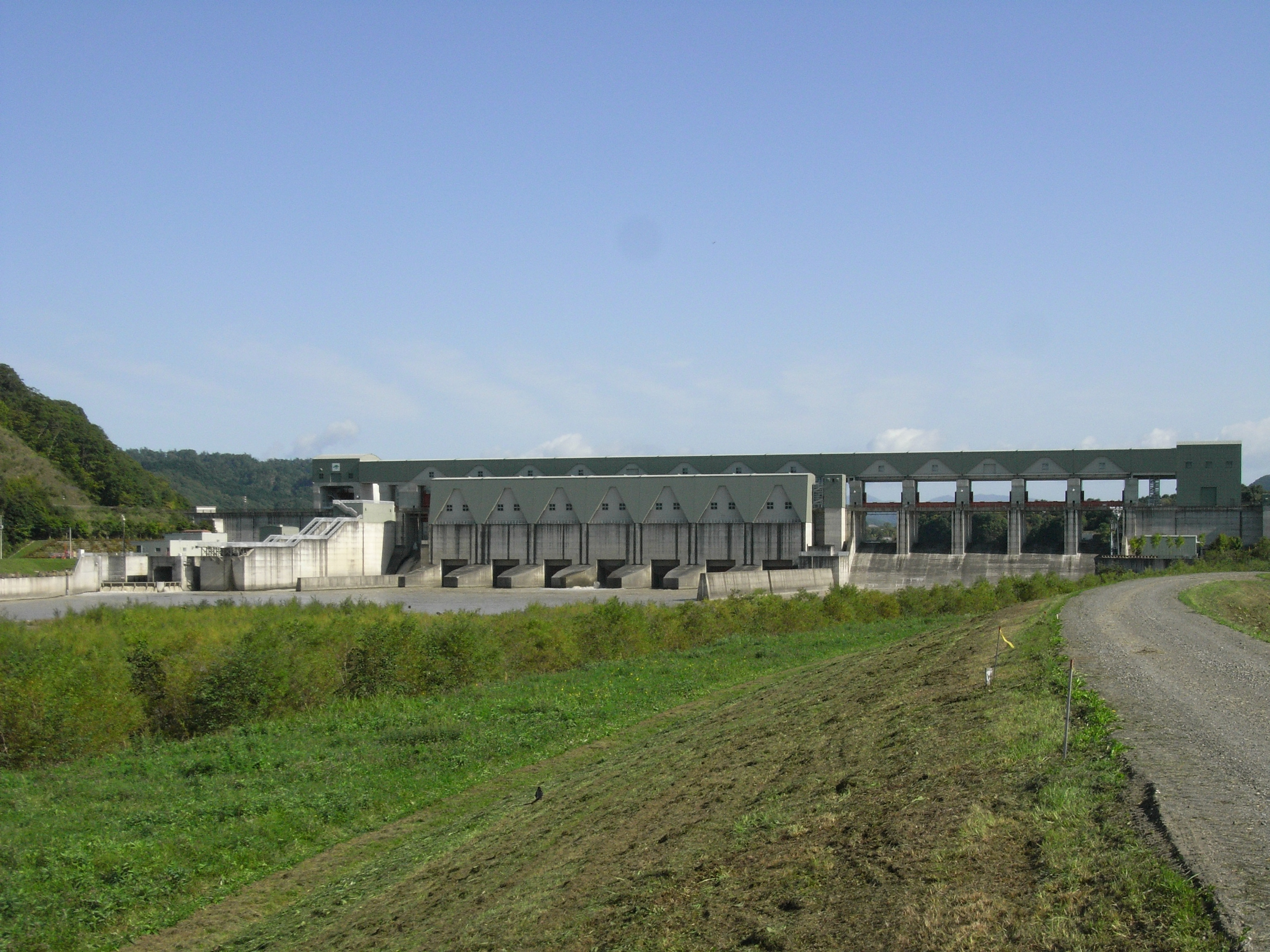
Nibutani Dam

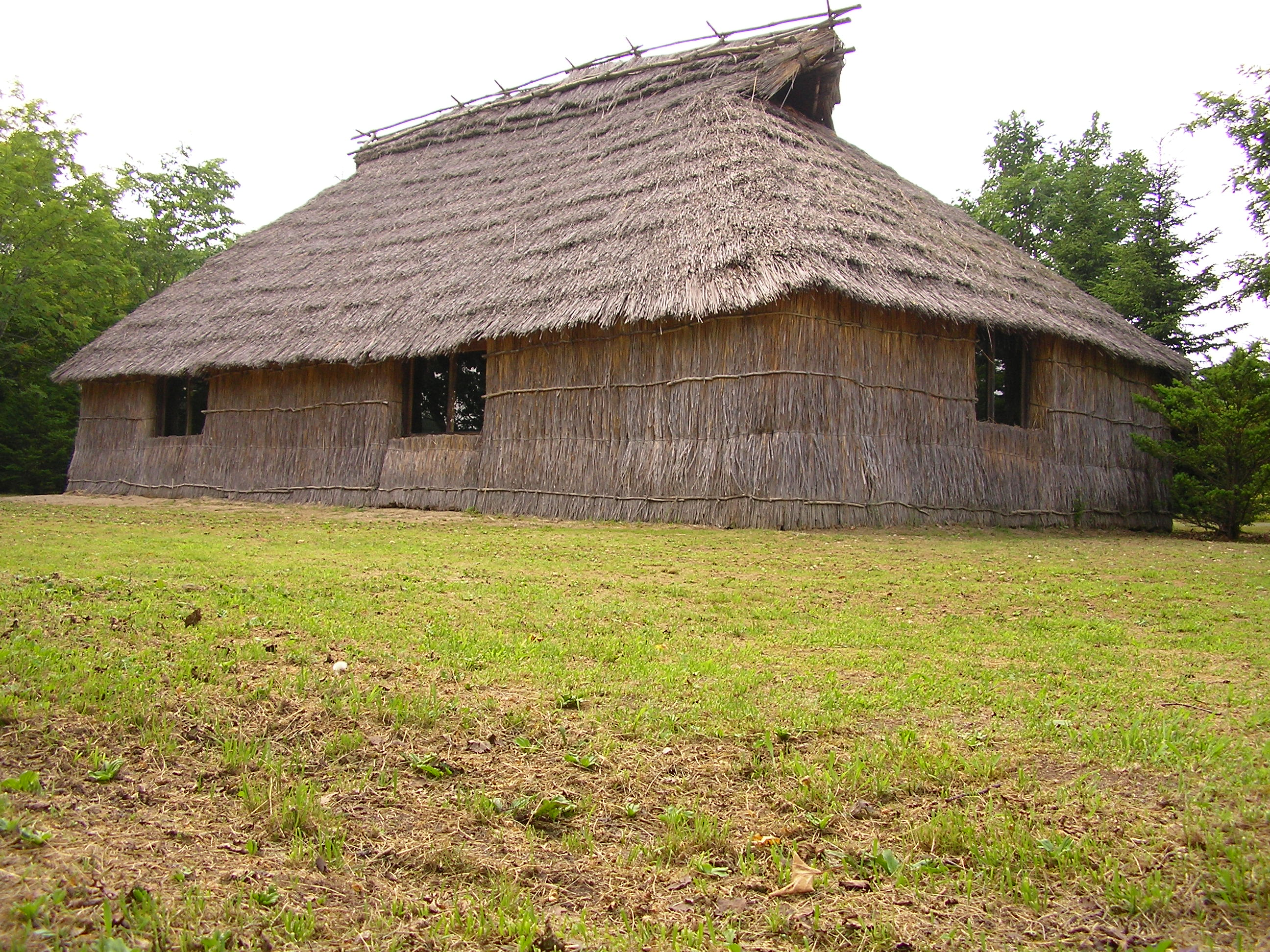
Nibutani Ainu Museum

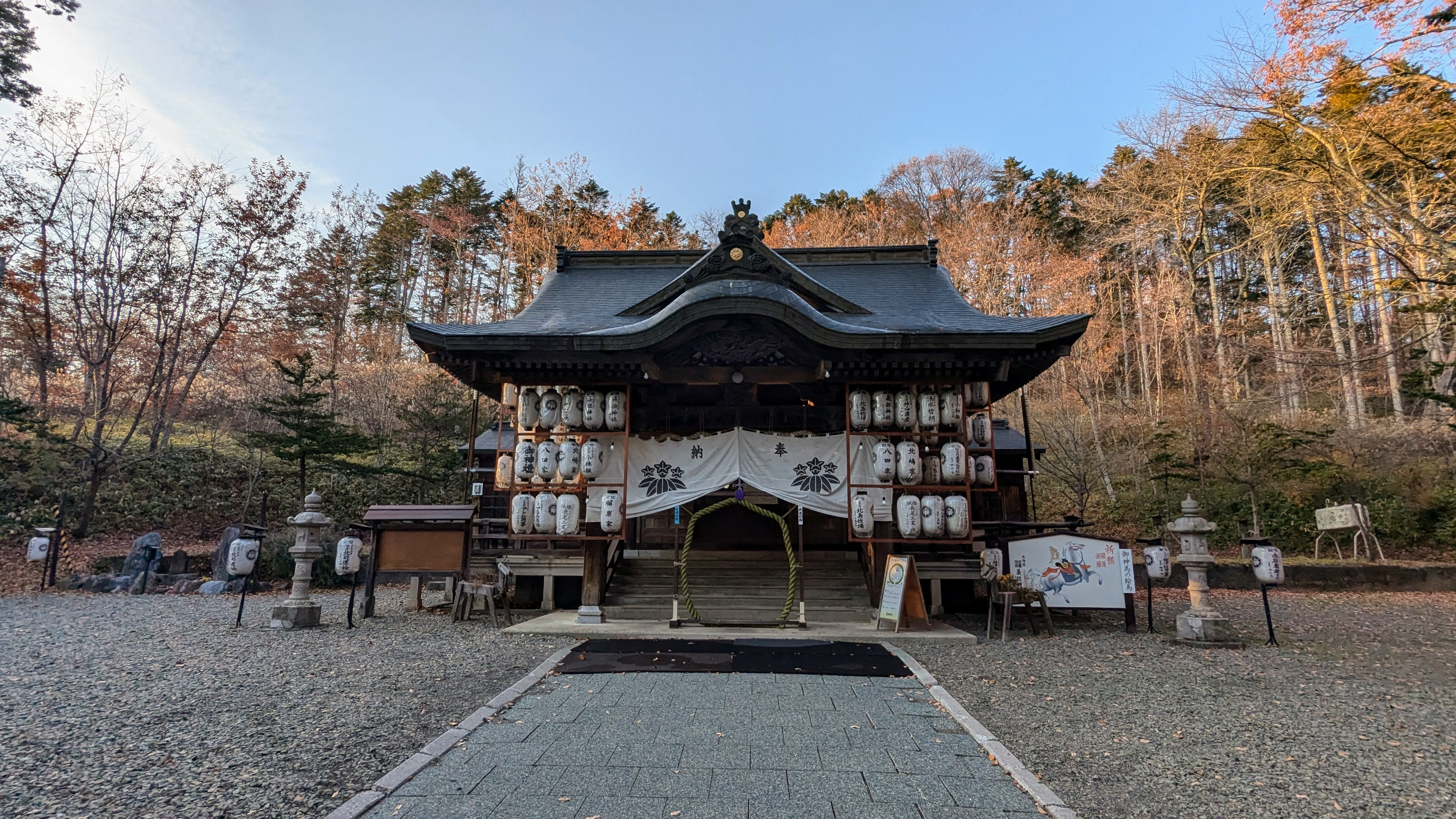
Yoshitsune Jinja

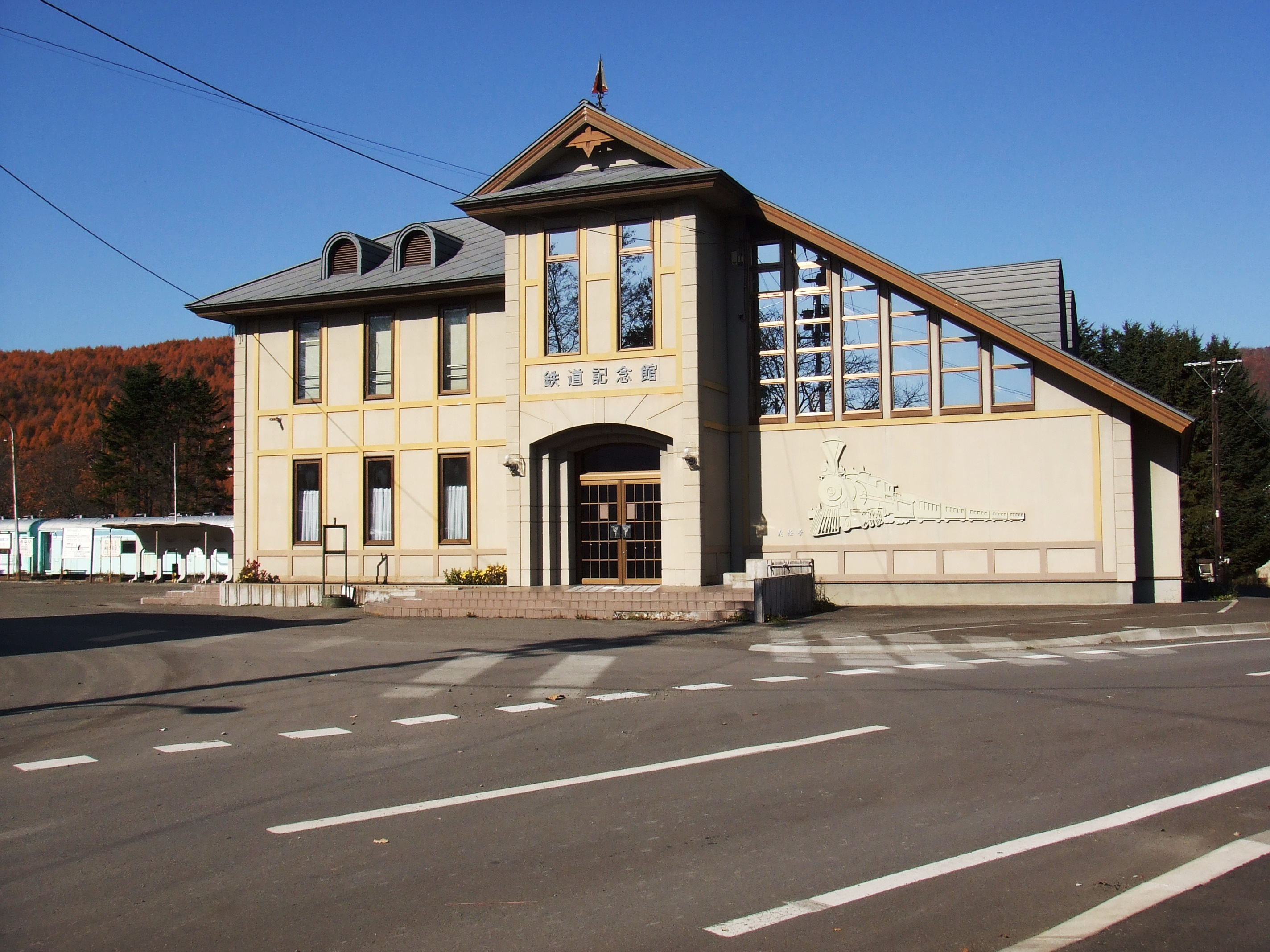
Furenai Railway Memorial Museum

=== Mascot ===
Bilicky, the town's mascot

Biratori's mascot is Bilicky (ビラッキー, Birakkī). His name is a pun on "be lucky". He is a tomato with a horn and hooves of a bull, a pig's nose and a lily of a valley on his back. His birthday is 12 September.

== Notable people from Biratori ==
- Shigeru Kayano (1926–2006), leading figure in the Ainu ethnic movement.
- Ryo Fukui (1948–2016), jazz pianist.

== See also ==
- Cultural Landscapes of Japan
