= Saru River =

River in Hokkaido, Japan

Saru River 沙流川
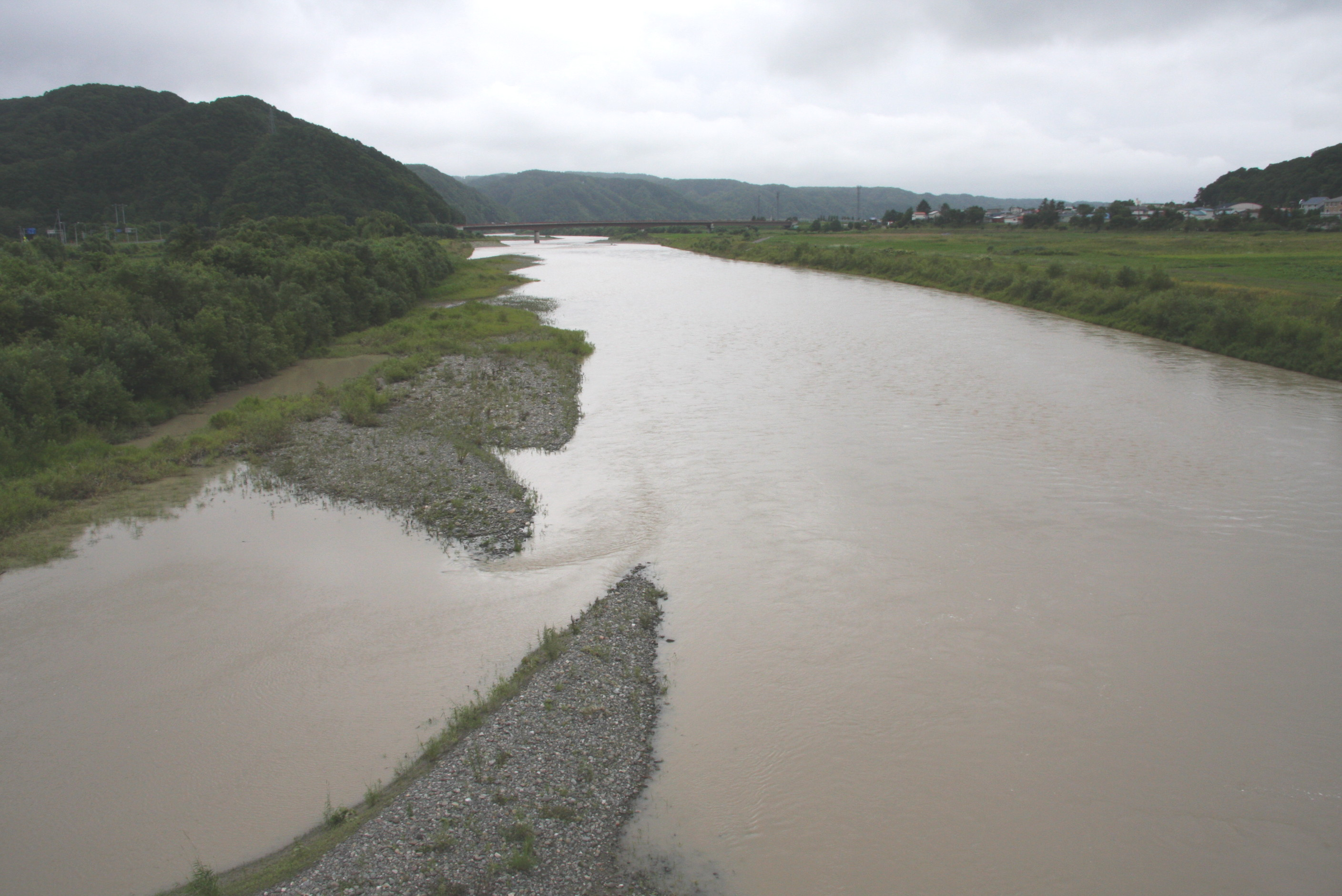

- Location within Japan
- Native name: Saru-gawa (Japanese)

Location
- Country: Japan
- State: Hokkaido
- Region: Hidaka Subprefecture
- District: Saru District
- Municipalities: Biratori, Hidaka

Physical characteristics
- Source: Mount Kumami
  - location: Hidaka, Hidaka Subprefecture, Japan
  - coordinates: 42°58′59″N 142°45′8″E
  - elevation: 930 m (3,050 ft)
- Mouth: Pacific Ocean
  - location: Hidaka, Hidaka Subprefecture, Japan
  - coordinates: 42°30′5″N 142°0′31″E
  - elevation: 0 m (0 ft)
- Length: 104 km (65 mi)
- Basin size: 1,350 km^{2} (520 sq mi)

The Saru River (沙流川, Saru-gawa) is a Class A river in Hokkaido, Japan.

The Saru River rises in the Hidaka Mountains and empties into the Pacific. It is considered sacred in traditional Ainu beliefs.

The Nibutani Dam is situated on the Saru River, at Nibutani village. The construction of this dam was the subject of famous domestic litigation, producing the first ever Japanese legal decision to recognise the Ainu people as an indigenous people. Construction of a second dam, the Biratori Dam is also planned by the Hokkaido Development Board. The 'Cultural Landscape along the Saru River resulting from Ainu Tradition and Modern Settlement' has been designated an Important Cultural Landscape.

== See also ==
- Cultural Landscapes of Japan
