= Cultural landscape (Japan) =

Government-designated landscape in Japan

A cultural landscape (文化的景観, bunkateki keikan) is a government-designated landscape in Japan, which has evolved together with the way of life and geocultural features of a region, and which is indispensable for understanding the lifestyle of the Japanese people. Cultural landscapes are recognized by the government of under article 2, paragraph 1, item 5 of the Law for the Protection of Cultural Properties (1950). Cultural landscapes of especially high value may be further designated as important cultural landscapes (重要文化的景観, Jūyō bunkateki keikan); as of October 31, 2025 there are seventy-three such landscapes.

Local governments that are in charge of designated cultural landscapes can obtain financial assistance from the Agency for Cultural Affairs for surveys and other research, the preparation of preservation plans, maintenance, repair, landscaping, restoration, disaster prevention, and promotional and educational activities.

== Background ==
Research into cultural landscapes began before the Second World War with increasing concern about their disappearance. Historical research into shōen and rural engineering, the scientific investigation of geographic features, and studies for urban and countryside planning have since increased. The movement to protect cultural landscapes has also been influenced by the Law Concerning Special Measures for the Preservation of Historical Natural Features in Ancient Cities (1966), the international trend for recognising "cultural landscapes" under the World Heritage Convention, the designation in 1980 of Mount Hakusan, Mount Ōdaigahara & Mount Ōmine, Shiga Highland and Yakushima as UNESCO Man and the Biosphere Reserves, the designation of Monuments of Japan, and initiatives such as the 100 selected terraced rice fields of Japan. From 2000 to 2003 a study was made to define the concept of "cultural landscape" and identify their distribution, with 2,311 areas identified in the first phase and 502 selected for the second, 180 being of particular importance.

== Selection criteria of important cultural landscapes ==
Important cultural landscapes are designated based on their type as:

1. single-type cultural lands associated with
  1. agriculture such as rice paddies, farmlands, etc.
  2. man-made grassland or livestock ranching such as hayfields, pastureland, etc.
  3. forests such as timber forests, disaster prevention forests, etc.
  4. fisheries such as fish cultivation rafts, nori seaweed cultivation fields, etc.
  5. water uses such as reservoirs, waterways, harbors, etc.
  6. mining or industrial manufacture such as mines, quarries, groups of workshops, etc.
  7. transportation and communication such as roads, plazas, etc.
  8. residences and settlements such as stonewalls, hedges, coppices attached to premises, etc.
2. a combination of two or more of the above cultural landscapes.

== List of important cultural landscapes ==
=== Usage ===
An overview of what is included in the table and the manner of sorting is as follows: the columns (with the exceptions of Remarks and Pictures) are sortable by pressing the arrows symbols.

- Name: the English name as used by the Agency for Cultural Affairs and Japanese name as registered in the Database of National Cultural Properties
- Criteria: the selection criteria for the designation as important cultural landscape
- Remarks: general remarks
- Location: "town-name prefecture-name"; The column entries sort as "prefecture-name town-name".
- Year: year of designation as important cultural landscape
- Picture: picture of (part of) the important cultural landscape

=== List ===
Name	Criteria	Remarks	Location	Year	Picture
Cultural landscape along the Sarugawa River resulting from Ainu Tradition and Modern Settlement (アイヌの伝統と近代開拓による沙流川流域の文化的景観, ainu no dentō to kindai kaitaku ni yoru sarugawa ryūiki no bunkateki keikan)	2	Litigation over the Nibutani Dam saw the advocacy of Ainu rights in a landmark case (1997).	Biratori, Hokkaidō	2007	A simple thatched house.
Farm Village of Hondera area, Ichinoseki (一関本寺の農村景観, ichinoseki hondera no nōson keikan)	1.1, 1.8, 2	Administered from the late Heian period to the early Muromachi period as the domain of the Sutra Repository Steward of Chuson-ji; in the Edo period it formed part of the Sendai domain.	Ichinoseki, Iwate	2006	
Tono Arakawa Heights Livestock Farm and Tsuchibuchi Yamaguchi Village (遠野 荒川高原牧場 土淵山口集落, Tōno Arakawakōgen bokujō tsuchibuchi yamaguchi shūraku)	1.2	Important historic pasture.	Tōno, Iwate	2008/9	
Landscape of Movements of Goods and People in Mogami River and the Aterazawa Townscape (最上川の流通・往来及び左沢町場の景観, mogamigawa no ryūtsū ōrai oyobi aterazawamachiba no keikan)	1.5, 1.7, 1.8, 2		Ōe, Yamagata	2013	
Townscape of Nagai in the upper reaches of the Mogami River (最上川上流域における長井の町場景観, mogamigaw jōryūiki ni okeru nagai no machiba keikan)	1.5, 1.7, 2		Nagai, Yamagata	2018	
Oya Cultural Landscape of Strange Rock Formations and Quarrying (大谷の奇岩群と採石産業の文化的景観, ōya no kigangun to saiseki sangyō no bunkateki keikan)	1.6, 1.8, 2		Utsunomiya, Tochigi	2024	
Fluvial landscape at the confluence of the Tone and Watarase Rivers (利根川・渡良瀬川合流域の水場景観, Tonegawa-Watarasegawa gōryūiki mizuba keikan)	1.1, 1.8, 2		Itakura, Gunma	2011	
Katsushika Shibamata cultural land (葛飾柴又の文化的景観, katsushika shibamata no bunkateki keikan)	1.5, 1.7, 2		Katsushika, Tokyo	2018	
Landscape of the rural villages where gold mining originated in Nishimikawa, Sado (佐渡西三川の砂金山由来の農山村景観, Sado Nishimikawa no sakin yurai no nōsanson keikan)	1.1, 1.5, 1.6, 1.8, 2		Sado, Niigata	2011	
Cultural landscape of the mining and mining town in Aikawa, Sado (佐渡相川の鉱山及び鉱山町の文化的景観, sado aikawa no kōzan oyobi kōzanmachi no bunkateki keikan)	1.8, 1.9, 1.10, 2		Sado, Niigata	2015	
Cultural landscape in Kanazawa. Tradition and culture in the castle town (金沢の文化的景観 城下町の伝統と文化, Kanazawa no bunkateki keikan; jōkamachi no dentō to bunka)	1.5, 1.7, 1.8	Kanazawa is a renowned centre of Japanese crafts.	Kanazawa, Ishikawa	2010	
Magaki (bamboo Fence) Village Landscape of Ōzawa and Kami Ōzawa (大沢・上大沢の間垣集落景観, Ōzawa Kami Ōzawa no magaki shūraku keikan)	1.1, 1.10, 2		Wajima, Ishikawa	2015	
Cultural landscape of coastal erosion control forests and villages in the Kaga coastal area (加賀海岸地域の海岸砂防林及び集落の文化的景観, kaga kaigan chiiki no kaigan sabōrin oyobi shūraku no bunkateki keikan)	1.3		Kaga, Ishikawa	2021	
Echizen Coast Daffodil fields and Shimo-misaki cultural landscape (越前海岸の水仙畑 下岬の文化的景観, echizen kaigan no suisenbatake shimomisaki no bunkateki keikan)	1.1		Fukui, Fukui	2021	
Echizen Coast Daffodil Fields and Kami-misaki cultural land (越前海岸の水仙畑 上岬の文化的景観, echizen kaigan no suisenbatake kamimisaki no bunkateki keikan)	1.1		Echizen, Fukui	2021	
Echizen Coast Daffodil Fields and Nuka cultural land (越前海岸の水仙畑 糠の文化的景観, echizen kaigan no suisenbatake nuka no bunkateki keikan)	1.1		Minamiechizen, Fukui	2021	
Rice terraces in Obasute (姨捨の棚田, Obasute no tanada)	1.1		Chikuma, Nagano	2010	
Cultural land of Kosuge Village and Mt. Kosuge (小菅の里及び小菅山の文化的景観, kosuge no sato oyobi kosugeyama no bunkateki keikan)	1.3, 1.5, 1.8, 2		Iiyama, Nagano	2015	
Cultural Landscape of Gifu in the Central Basin of the Nagara River (長良川中流域における岐阜の文化的景観, nagara-gawa chūryūiki ni okeru gifu no bunkateki keikan)	1.3, 1.4, 1.7, 1.8, 2		Gifu, Gifu	2014	
Wetland in Ōmi-hachiman (近江八幡の水郷, Ōmi Hachiman no suigō)	1.5, 1.8	Riverside district of the former castle town.	Ōmihachiman, Shiga	2006	
Waterfront of Kaizu, Nishihama, and Chinai in Takashima City (高島市海津・西浜・知内の水辺景観, Takashima-shi Kaizu Nishihama Chinai no mizube keikan)	1.5, 1.7		Takashima, Shiga	2008	
Waterfront of Harie and Shimofuri in Takashima City (高島市針江・霜降の水辺景観, Takashima-shi Harie Shimofuri no mizube keikan)	1.5, 1.8, 2		Takashima, Shiga	2010	
Lakeshore landscape at Sugaura (菅浦の湖岸集落景観, sugaura no kogan shūraku keikan)	1.1, 1.3, 1.7, 1.8, 2		Nagahama, Shiga	2014	
Mountain Village landscape of Higashi Kusano (東草野の山村景観, higashi kusano no sanson keikan)	1.5, 1.7, 1.8, 2		Maibara, Shiga	2014	
Ōmizo Lakeside Landscape (大溝の水辺景観, Ōmizo no mizube keikan)	1.5, 1.7, 1.8, 2		Takashima, Shiga	2015	
Rural Landscape of Lake Ibanai (伊庭内湖の農村景観, ibanai-ko nōson keikan)	1.5, 1.8, 2		Higashiōmi, Shiga	2018	
Cultural landscape in Uji (宇治の文化的景観, Uji no bunkateki keikan)	2		Uji, Kyoto	2009	River with a bridge and boats.
Cultural landscape of Miyazu Amanohashidate (宮津天橋立の文化的景観, miyazu amanohashidate no bunkateki keikan)	1.4, 1.7, 1.8, 2		Miyazu, Kyoto	2014	
Cultural landscape of Okazaki in Kyoto (京都岡崎の文化的景観, Kyōto okazaki no bunkateki keikan)	1.5, 1.7, 2		Kyoto, Kyoto	2015	
Rural landscape of Hinenosho Ōgi (日根荘大木の農村景観, Hinenosho Ōgi no nōson keikan)	1.1, 1.8, 2		Izumisano, Osaka	2013	
Cultural landscape of Ikuno mine and townscape (生野鉱山及び鉱山町の文化的景観, ikuno kōzan oyobi kōzanmachi no bunkateki keikan)	1.6, 1.7, 1.8, 2		Asago, Hyōgo	2014	
Cultural landscape of the Asuka hinterland (奥飛鳥の文化的景観, Oku-Asuka no bunkateki keikan)	1.1, 1.5, 1.8, 2		Asuka, Nara	2011	
Aragijima Rice Terraces and Rural Mountain Village Landscape of Mita/Shimizu (蘭島及び三田・清水の農山村景観, aragijima oyobi Mita Shimizu no nōsanson keikan)	1.1, 1.8, 2		Aridagawa, Wakayama	2013	
Chizu forestry landscape (智頭の林業景観, chizu no ringyō keikan)	1.3		Chizu, Tottori	2018	
Cultural landscape of Tatara iron manufacturing and rice terraces in Okuizumo (奥出雲たたら製鉄及び棚田の文化的景観, okuizumo tatara seitetsu oyobi tanada no bunkateki keikan)	1.1, 1.2, 1.5, 1.6, 1.8, 2		Okuizumo, Shimane	2014	
Cultural landscape of Kintai Bridge and Iwakuni Castle town in the downstream area of the Nishiki River (錦川下流域における錦帯橋と岩国城下町の文化的景観, nishikigawa karyūiki ni okeru Kintai-kyō to iwakuni jōkamachi no bunkateki keikan)	1.7, 1.8, 2		Iwakuni, Yamaguchi	2021	
Rice Terraces and Rural Landscape of Kashihara (樫原の棚田及び農村景観, Kashihara no tanada oyobi nōson keikan)	1.1, 1.8, 2		Kamikatsu, Tokushima	2010	
Danbata (terraced fields) in Yusumizugaura (遊子水荷浦の段畑, Yusumizugaura no danbata)	1.1		Uwajima, Ehime	2007	
Okuuchi rice terraces, agricultural and mountainous village landscape (奥内の棚田及び農山村景観, Okuuchi no tanada oyobi nōsanson keikan)	1.1		Matsuno, Ehime	2017	
Uwakai Karihama terrace fields, fishing and agricultural village (宇和海狩浜の段畑と農漁村景観, uwakai karihama no danbatake to nōgyoson)	1.1, 1.4, 2		Seiyo, Ehime	2019	
Kure port and fishing townscape (久礼の港と漁師町の景観, Kure no minato to ryōshi machi no keikan)	1.4, 1.5		Tosa, Kōchi	2011	
Cultural landscape in the Shimantogawa River basin. Villages in the mountains to the headwater region (四万十川流域の文化的景観 源流域の山村, Shimantogawa ryūiki no bunkateki keikan genryūiki no sanson)	2		Tsuno, Kōchi	2009	
Cultural landscape in the Shimantogawa River basin. Villages and rice terraces in the mountains at the upstream region (四万十川流域の文化的景観 上流域の山村と棚田, Shimantogawa ryūiki no bunkateki keikan jōryūiki no sanson to tanada)	2		Yusuhara, Kōchi	2009	
Cultural landscape in the Shimantogawa River basin. Circulation and traffic among agricultural and mountainous villages at the upstream region (四万十川流域の文化的景観 上流域の農山村と流通・往来, Shimantogawa ryūiki no bunkateki keikan jōryūiki no nōsanson to ryūtsū ōrai)	2		Nakatosa, Kōchi	2009	
Cultural landscape in the Shimantogawa River basin. Circulation and traffic among agricultural and mountainous villages at the middlestream region (四万十川流域の文化的景観 中流域の農山村と流通・往来, Shimantogawa ryūiki no bunkateki keikan chūryūiki no nōsanson to ryūtsū ōrai)	2		Shimanto, Kōchi	2009	A river dam made of five concrete pylons and metal shutters.
Cultural landscape in the Shimantogawa River basin. Vocations, circulation and traffic in the downstream region (四万十川流域の文化的景観 下流域の生業と流通・往来, Shimantogawa ryūiki no bunkateki keikan karyūiki no nariwai to ryūtsū ōrai)	2		Shimanto, Kōchi	2009	A wide river in a green mountain landscape.
Rural Landscape of Kubote (求菩提の農村景観, Kubote no nōson keikan)	1.1, 1.8, 2		Fukuoka	2012	
Rice terraces in Warabino (蕨野の棚田, Warabino no tanada)	1.1	located on a north facing horseshoe shaped steep slope of Mount Hachiman (八幡岳, hachimandake); area: 34 ha (84 acres), average step height: 3–5 m (9.8–16.4 ft) (up to 8 m (26 ft) max)	Karatsu, Saga	2008	
Cultural landscape of Hisaka Island, Gotō (五島市久賀島の文化的景観, Gotō-shi Hisakajima no bunkateki keikan)	1.3, 1.8, 2		Gotō, Nagasaki	2011	
Cultural landscape of Kuroshima, Sasebo (佐世保市黒島の文化的景観, Sasebo-shi Kuroshima no bunkateki keikan)	1.1, 1.8, 2		Sasebo, Nagasaki	2011	
Cultural landscape of the Ojika islands (小値賀諸島の文化的景観, Ojikashotō no bunkateki keikan)	1.7, 1.8		Ojika, Nagasaki	2011	
Island landscape at Shinkamigoto (新上五島町崎浦の五島石集落景観, Shinkamigotō-chō Sakiura no gotōishi shūraku keikan)	1.6, 1.8, 2		Shinkamigotō, Nagasaki	2012	
Cultural landscape of Kitauonome, Shinkamigotō (新上五島町北魚目の文化的景観, Shinkamigotō-chō Kitauonome no bunkateki keikan)	1.2		Shinkamigotō, Nagasaki	2012	
Landscape with terraces retained by stonework at Sotome, Nagasaki (長崎市外海の石積集落景観, Nagasaki-shi sotome no ishizumi shūraku keikan)	1.1, 1.8, 2		Nagasaki, Nagasaki	2012	
Cultural landscape in Hirado island (平戸島の文化的景観, Hiradoshima no bunkateki keikan)	1.1, 1.5, 1.8		Hirado, Nagasaki	2010	
Landscape with Tsūjun irrigation channel and rice terraces in Shiraito Plateau (通潤用水と白糸台地の棚田景観, Tsūjun yōsui to Shiraito daichi no tanada keikan)	1.1, 1.5, 2	The discharge of water from the Tsūjun Bridge is one of the 100 Soundscapes of Japan	Yamato, Kumamoto	2008/9	A stone arch bridge.
Cultural Landscape of Sakitsu and Imatomi, Amakusa (天草市﨑津・今富の文化的景観, Amakusa-shi sakitsu imatomi no bunkateki keikan)	1.4, 1.7, 1.8		Amakusa, Kumamoto	2011	
Cultural landscape of Misumi Bay (三角浦の文化的景観, musimuura no bunkateki keikan)	1.5, 1.7, 1.8, 2		Uki, Kumamoto	2015	
Cultural Landscape of Aso: Grassland of the northern outer rim of Mount Aso (阿蘇の文化的景観 阿蘇北外輪山の草原景観, aso no bunkateki keikan aso kitagairinsan no sōgen keikan)	1.2		Aso, Kumamoto	2017	
Cultural Landscape of Aso: Grassland and forest landscape in the western part of Minamioguni town (阿蘇の文化的景観 南小国町西部の草原及び森林景観, aso no bunkateki keikan minamioguni-machi seibu no sōgen oyobi shinrin keikan)	1.2, 1.3, 2		Minamioguni, Kumamoto	2017	
Cultural Landscape of Aso: Grassland landscape at the foot of Mount Waita (阿蘇の文化的景観 涌蓋山麓の草原景観, aso no bunkateki keikan waitasanroku no sōgen keikan)	1.2		Oguni, Kumamoto	2017	
Cultural Landscape of Aso: Rural Landscape of Ubuyama Village (阿蘇の文化的景観 産山村の農村景観, aso no bunkateki keikan ubuyamamura no nōson keikan)	1.1, 1.2, 1.3, 2		Ubuyama, Kumamoto	2017	
Cultural Landscape of Aso: Grassland scenery at the southern foot of Mount Neko (阿蘇の文化的景観 根子岳南麓の草原景観, aso no bunkateki keikan nekodake-nanroku no sōgen keikan)	1.2		Takamori, Kumamoto	2017	
Cultural Landscape of Aso: Grassland and forest landscape in the southwest of Mount Aso (阿蘇の文化的景観 阿蘇山南西部の草原及び森林景観, aso no bunkateki keikan asosan-nanseibu no sōgen oyobi shinrin keikan)	1.1, 1.2, 2		Minamiaso, Kumamoto	2017	
Cultural Landscape of Aso: Grassland Landscape in the western part of the Aso outer rim (阿蘇の文化的景観 阿蘇外輪山西部の草原景観, aso no bunkateki keikan asogairinzan seibu no sōgen keikan)	1.2		Nishihara, Kumamoto	2017	
Ontayaki Village (小鹿田焼の里, Ontayaki no sato)	2		Hita, Ōita	2008	A plate with a spiral pattern in the middle and a stripe pattern along the rim.
Rural landscape of Tashibunoshō Osaki (田染荘小崎の農村景観, Tashibunoshō Osaki no nōson keikan)	1.1, 1.8, 2		Bungotakada, Ōita	2010	
Steam and hot spring landscape in Beppu (別府の湯けむり・温泉地景観, Beppu no yukemuri onsenchi keikan)	1.5, 1.6, 2		Beppu, Ōita	2012	
Seaside village scenery of Himeshima Island in the Seto Inland Sea (瀬戸内海姫島の海村景観, seto naikai himeshima no kaison keikan)	1.8		Himeshima, Ōita	2021	
Ogata River and rural landscape of the Ogata basin (緒方川と緒方盆地の農村景観, ogatagawa to ogata-bonchi no nōson keikan)	1.5		Bungo-Ōno, Ōita	2023	
Sakamoto Rice Terraces and Rural Mountain Village Landscape of Sakatani (酒谷の坂元棚田及び農山村景観, sakatani no sakamoto tanada oyobi nōsanson keikan)	1.1, 1.3, 2		Nichinan, Miyazaki	2013	
Cultural landscape originating from phosphate mines on Kitadaito Island (北大東島の燐鉱山由来の文化的景観, ogatagawa to ogata-bonchi no nōson keikan)	1.5, 1.6, 1.8, 2		Kitadaitō, Okinawa	2018	
Fukugi forest and village landscape in Imadomari, Nakijin Village (今帰仁村今泊のフクギ屋敷林と集落景観, nakijin-son imadomari no fukugi yashikirin to shūraku keikan)	1.8		Nakijin, Okinawa	2019	

== See also ==
- Cultural landscapes−related topics — international.
- Cultural Landscapes of Australia
- Historic American Landscapes Survey (HALS) — U.S. cultural landscape heritage documentation program.
