= Nibutani =

District of Biratori, Hokkaido, Japan

Coordinates: 42°38′10″N 142°09′35″E

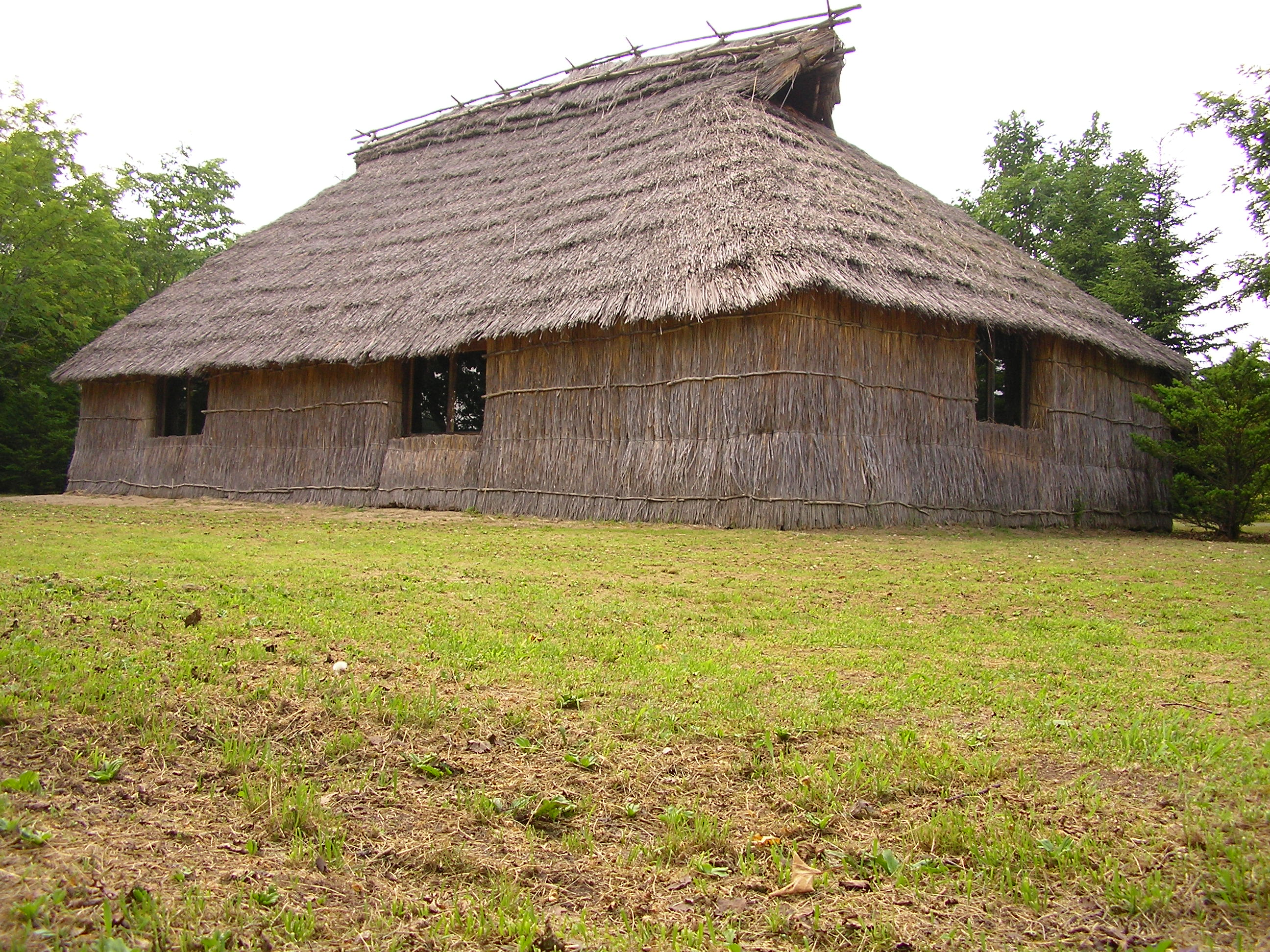
Reconstruction of a traditional Ainu dwelling (cise, pronounced CHEE-seh), outside of the Nibutani Ainu Culture Museum

Nibutani (Japanese: 二風谷), or Niptani (Ainu: ニㇷ゚タニ), is a district in the town of Biratori, Hokkaido, now in Japan. It was once known as Pipaushi, which is Ainu for "a place rich in shells" The population as of 2010 was 395 people. A particularly large proportion of the district's population is Ainu. As of 2000, over 80% of the residents were Ainu, making it the settlement with the highest percentage of Ainu residents in the country.

It is also the site of the Nibutani Dam, and the hometown of Kayano Shigeru. Nibutani is also the site of two Ainu museums, the Kayano Shigeru Nibutani Ainu Museum and the Nibutani Ainu Culture Museum, as well as the Nibutani Family Land.

== History ==
Takeda Nobuhiro established a base in Kaminokuni on the western side of the Oshima Peninsula, the southern tip of Hokkaidō, then called Ezo, in 1454, beginning control of what would become ethnic Yamato holdings there. In 1457, Koshamain's War broke out; southern Ezo Ainu began one of the largest Ainu-Yamato conflicts, sacking twelve Yamato castles in Ezo. The forces of Nobuhiro were finally victorious, although the settlement and its samurai were too few to actually dominate the region. His descendants continued to rule this small area independently of the Ashikaga shogunate in mainland Japan; after the 1600 establishment of the Tokugawa shogunate, they took the name Matsumae and ruled the Matsumae Domain as tozama daimyō from Matsumae Castle after 1606.

Under the Matsumae, Ainu were placed into forced labour for one-seventh to one-fifth pay by Matsumae retainers, which the Ainu regarded as slavery. Nibutani Ainu were taken as slaves to Akkeshi, Hokkaido, over 350 kilometres (220 mi) away, on the other side of the island. Extermination through labour and flight north out of Matsumae territory significantly reduced the eastern Ainu, leading to labour relocation from the Saru and Yufutsu areas.

In 1858, according to Matsuura Takeshirō's Saru Journal quoted by Kayano Shigeru, the combined populations of Nifutani (as it was called then), Pipaus, and Kankan were 116 villagers from twenty-six households. Of that number, 43 were drafted for forced labour, including Shigeru's own grandfather, Totkaram, at the age of 11. Detailed information about the names, ages and households of each village was provided by the Saru Journal. Kayano relates that it was Matsuura Takeshirō "who, angered by the cruelty of the Matsumae province and the 'location' contractors, made repeated proposals that eventually led to the abolition of forced labor."

In 1868, under the Meiji Restoration, Ezo was renamed Hokkaidō and formally annexed into the Empire of Japan.
