= Nibutani Dam =

Dam in Hokkaidō, Japan

Coordinates: 42.6294°N 142.1486°E

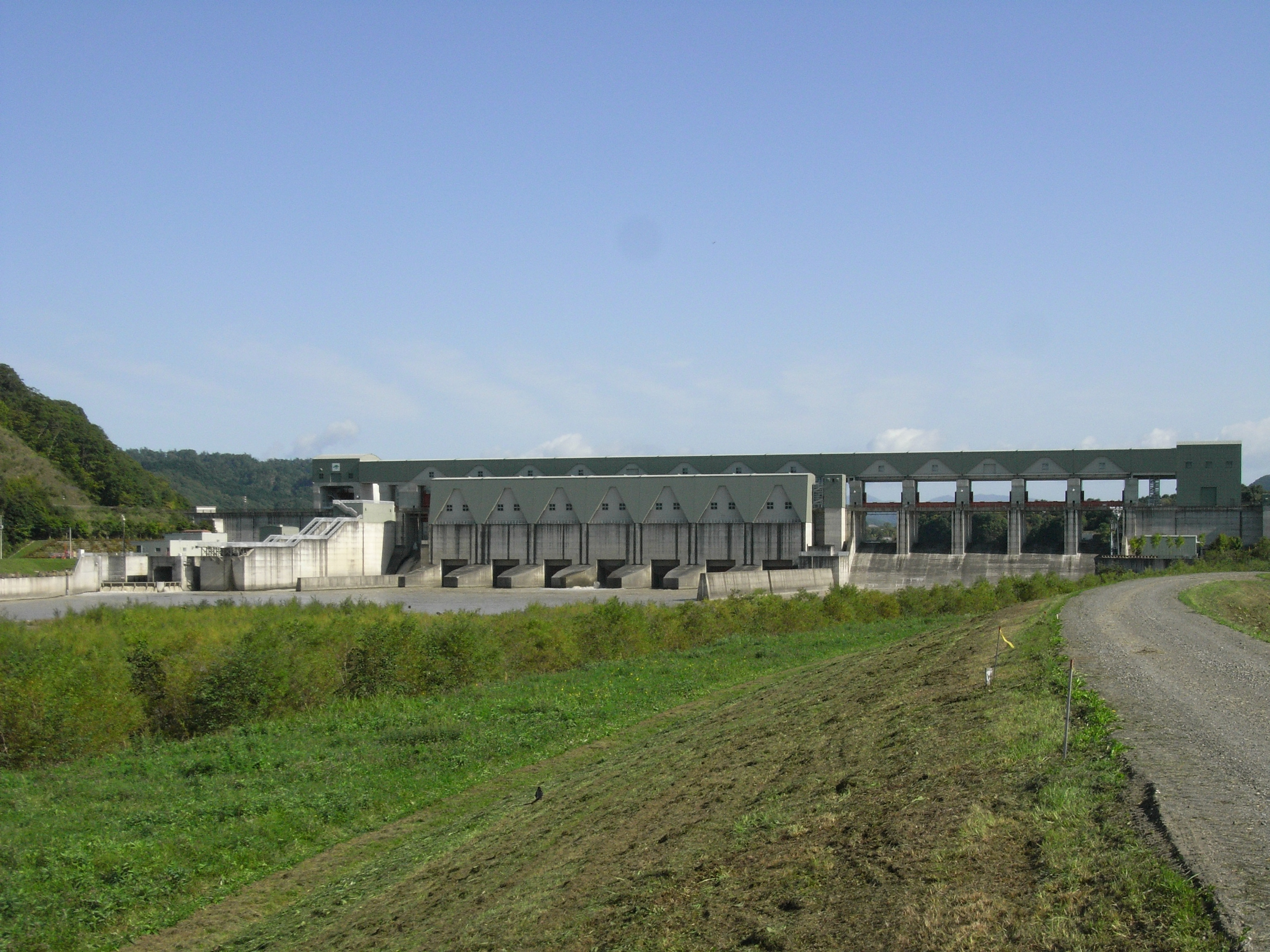
- Interactive map of Nibutani Dam
- Location: Biratori, Saru District, Hokkaidō, Japan.
- Construction began: 1973
- Opening date: 1997

Dam and spillways
- Impounds: Saru River
- Height: 32 m
- Length: 550 m

Reservoir
- Total capacity: 27,100,000 m^{3}
- Catchment area: 1,215.0 km^{2}
- Surface area: 400 hectares

Nibutani Dam (二風谷ダム, Nibutani-damu) is a dam on the Saru River in Hokkaidō, Japan, which stands at Nibutani in Biratori town, Saru District. Work on the dam began in 1973. It was completed in 1997, despite formal objections from the local Ainu people dating as early as 1987.

== Controversy ==
The building of the dam pitted the Japanese government against the indigenous Ainu, in a legal case filed by two Ainu landowners, Tadashi Kaizawa and Shigeru Kayano. These two farmers of Ainu descent claimed the government had illegally seized their land in February 1989. They believed that the expropriation of their land to build dam violated their rights as Ainu for the protection of their cultural heritage because the dam construction would destroy sacred sites and ritual grounds had not been adequately considered in the forced taking of their lands. At this time, there were no indigenous rights afforded to the Ainu people, as they were not recognised as being indigenous to Japan.

In a landmark decision by the Sapporo District Court, Chief Judge Kazuo Ichimiya stated that the Ainu people had established a unique culture in Hokkaido before the arrival of the Japanese and therefore had rights that should have given consideration under Article 13 of Japan's Constitution, which protects the rights of the individual, and in the International Covenant on Civil and Political Rights. Since the dam was already complete, the 3-judge panel did not nullify the land seizure. However, the decision included extensive fact-finding that underscored the long history of the oppression of the Ainu people by Japan's ethnic majority, referred to as "Wajin" in the case and discussions about the case.

== Sources ==
- Nibutani Dam Decision (Levin trans.)
- International Rivers information on Nibutani
- Mark A. Levin, Essential Commodities and Racial Justice: Using Constitutional Protection of Japan’s Indigenous Ainu People to Inform Understandings of the United States and Japan, New York University Journal of International Law and Politics, Vol. 33, 2001
