= Nibutani Ainu Culture Museum =

Ainu culture museum in Biratori, Japan

- 平取町立二風谷アイヌ文化博物館
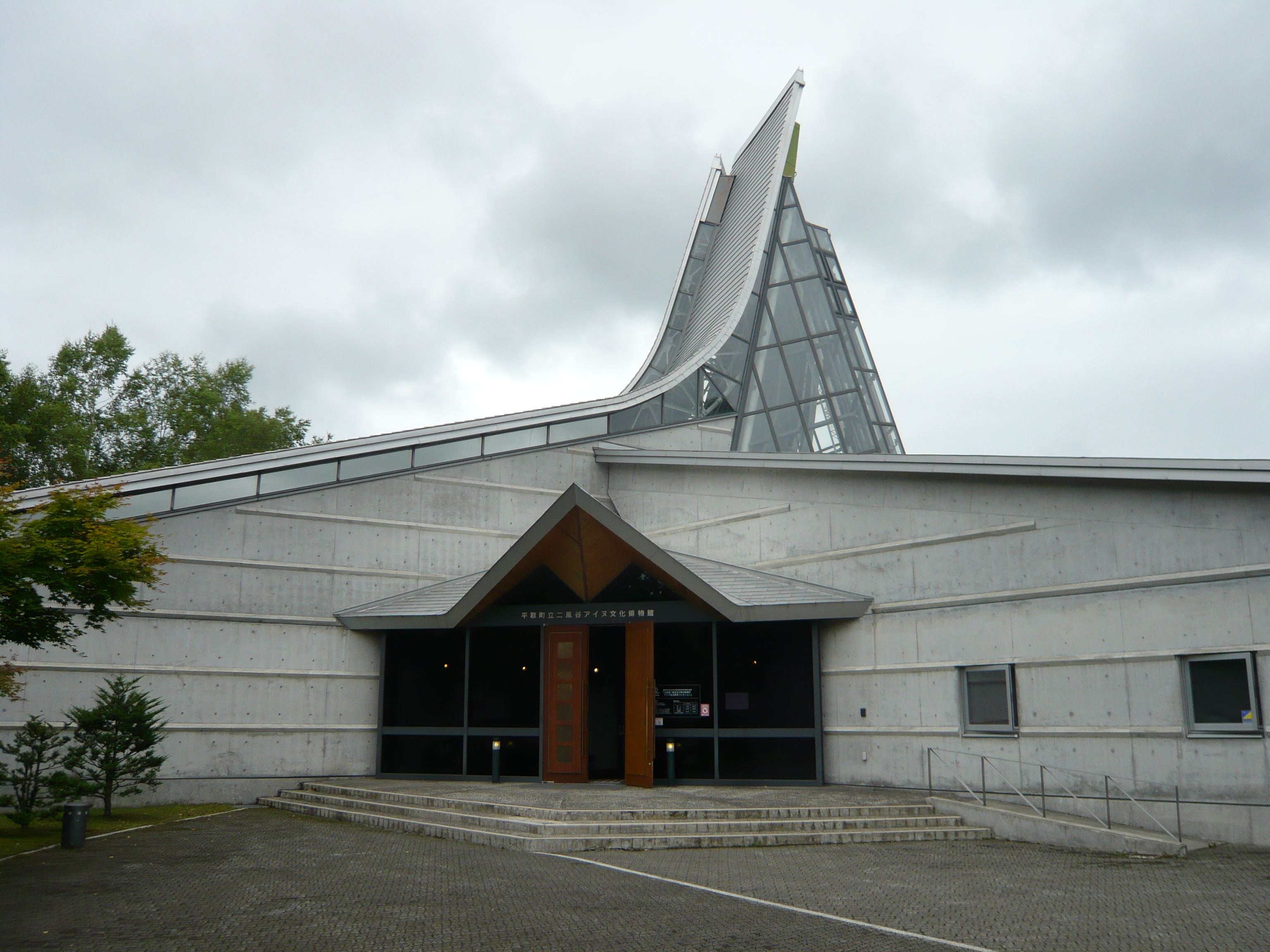
- Interactive map of the Nibutani Ainu Culture Museum area

General information
- Location: 55, Nibutani, Biratori, Hokkaidō, Japan
- Coordinates: 42°38′13″N 142°09′25″E
- Opened: 1992

Website
- Official website

Nibutani Ainu Culture Museum (平取町立二風谷アイヌ文化博物館, Biratori-chō Nibutani Ainu Bunka Hakubutsukan) opened in the Nibutani area of Biratori, Hokkaidō, Japan in 1992. The collection includes 919 items relating to the daily life of the local Ainu that have been jointly designated an Important Tangible Folk Cultural Property; a further 202 items from the same designation may be found at the nearby Kayano Shigeru Nibutani Ainu Museum (萱野茂二風谷アイヌ資料館).

== See also ==
- Historical Museum of the Saru River
- List of Important Tangible Folk Cultural Properties
- List of Historic Sites of Japan (Hokkaidō)
- Hokkaido Museum
- Ainu culture
