= Saru District, Hokkaido =

District in Hokkaido, Japan

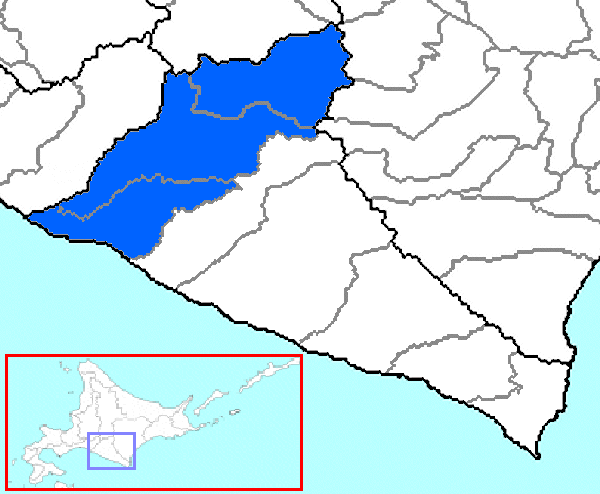
The area of Saru District in Hidaka Subprefecture.

Saru (沙流郡, Saru-gun; Ainu: Sar) is a district located in Hidaka Subprefecture, Hokkaido, Japan.

== Population ==
As of 2004, the district has an estimated population of 21,190 and a density of 12.21 persons per km^{2}. The total area is 1,735.83 km^{2}.

== Towns and villages ==
- Biratori 42°35′06″N 142°07′43″E (town office)
- Hidaka 42°28′49″N 142°04′28″E (town office)

== Merger ==
- On March 1, 2006, the town of Monbetsu merged into the expanded town of Hidaka.
