= Ainu culture =

Overview of the culture of the Japanese indigenous people

Ainu culture refers to the traditions of the Ainu people, dating back to around the 13th century (late Kamakura period) to the present. Today, most Ainu people live a life superficially similar to that of mainstream Japanese people, partly due to cultural assimilation. However, while some people conceal or downplay their Ainu identity, Ainu culture is still practiced among many groups. The Ainu way of life is called Ainupuri in the Ainu language (literally ainu + puri "customs, manners"). The unique Ainu patterns and oral literature (yukar) have been selected as features of Hokkaido Heritage.

== Overview ==
The term "Ainu culture" has two meanings. One is an anthropological perspective, referring to the cultural forms held by the Ainu people as an ethnic group, which includes both the culture held or created by the modern Ainu and the culture of their ancestors. The other usage, from an archeological perspective, refers to the cultural forms created by the indigenous peoples of Hokkaido and the northern Tohoku region after the Satsumon culture period.

The mainstream theory maintains that the Ainu culture originated from the local Hokkaido-Jōmon culture, a merger of the Okhotsk and Satsumon subcultures. It is suggested that Hokkaido was continuously occupied by a people who undertook a cultural shift. This is similar to the situation in which the Japanese maintained the Heian culture until the 12th century and then shifted to the Kamakura culture in the 13th century. In other words, the population remained the same, but the culture changed. Although there was not as much of a material cultural break as the change from the Jomon to the Yayoi period, later cultural customs differed greatly from earlier ones. The Ainu culture is considered indigenous to Hokkaido, Sakhalin, and the Kurils, as well as the Tōhoku region of Honshu. Early Ainu-speaking groups (mostly hunters and fishermen) also migrated into the Kamchatka Peninsula. Evidence for Ainu speakers in Honshu is through the Ainu toponyms found in several places of northern Honshu, mostly along the western coast and in the Tōhoku region. Evidence for Ainu speakers in the Amur region is found through Ainu loanwords in the Uilta and Ulch people.

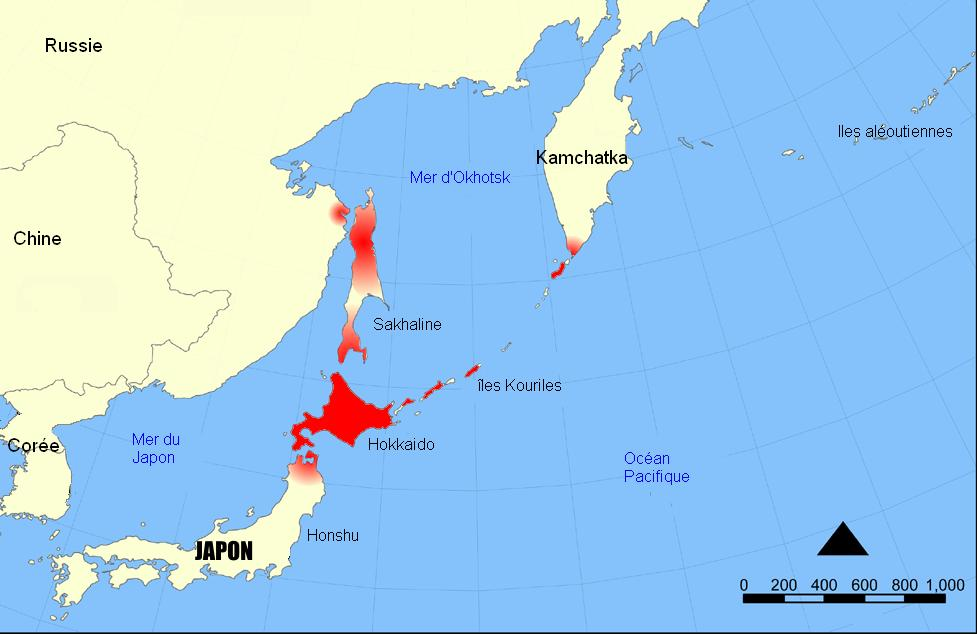
Historical homeland and distribution of the Ainu people.

The Hokkaido Jōmon people, which predated the formation of the Ainu people and culture, formed from "proper Jōmon tribes of Honshu" and from "Terminal Upper-Paleolithic people" (TUP people) indigenous to Paleolithic Northern Eurasia. These two groups merged in Hokkaido, giving rise to the local Hokkaido Jōmon in about 15,000 BC. The Ainu in turn formed from a blending of the local Hokkaido Jōmon and the Okhotsk tribes.

According to Tanaka Sakurako from the University of British Columbia, the Ainu culture can be included into a wider "northern circumpacific region", referring to various Indigenous cultures of Northeast Asia and "beyond the Bering Strait" in North America.

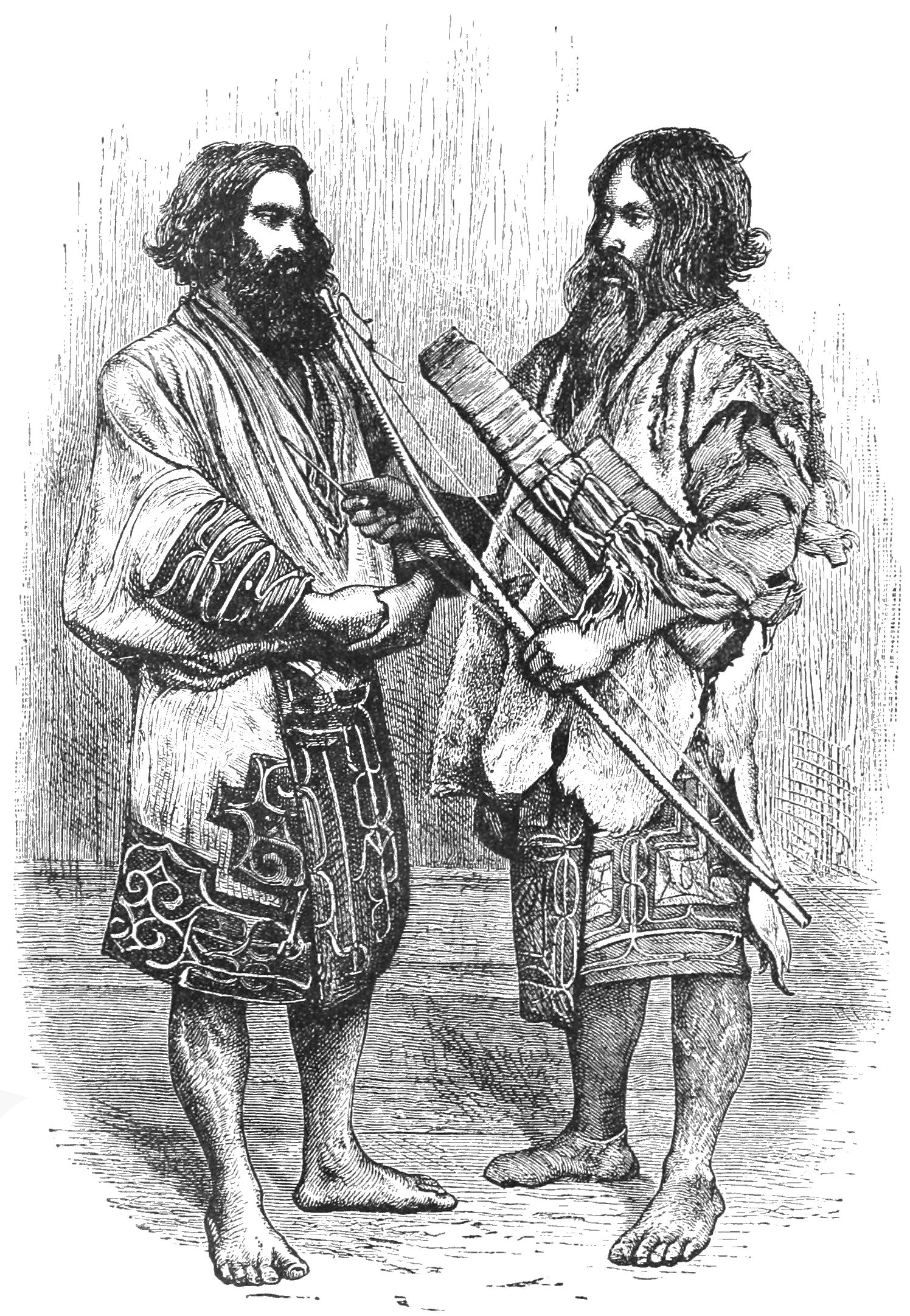
Two Ainu hunters c. 1878

The academic issue is that the term "Ainu culture" can mean both "the culture of an ethnic group" and "a cultural style that existed at a certain time in history". Although the Ainu still exist as an ethnic group, they have not retained their culture completely in the archaeological sense, since modern Ainu do not live in Chise anymore and do not lead a fishing and gathering lifestyle. However, modern Ainu are the descendants of the people who developed the archaeological Ainu culture, and the cultural styles preserved by modern Ainu are also qualified to be called Ainu culture. In 2007, Takuro Segawa proposed that the historical "Ainu culture" from the Middle Ages to the early modern period (in the archaeological context) should be called "Nibutani culture", after the Nibutani site, one of the most important archaeological sites in Hokkaido.

== Archaeological evidence ==
In archaeological terms, Ainu culture is marked by material cultural features such as iron pots, lacquerware bowls, sake chopsticks, bone hunting tools, hooked harpoons for salmon fishing, and extended burials. The Ainu culture is also known to have had regional differences. According to Rinzō Mamiya's Hoki Bunkai Yōwa (compiled by Murakami Sadasuke (1780-1846) based on Mamiya Rinzo's dictation of his exploration in Sakhalin), the Sakhalin Ainu adopted cultural elements from surrounding cultures, such as the use of dog sledding and skiing. In the early modern period, they retained cultural elements found in the Okhotsk culture in northern Hokkaido, such as the production of earthenware and the use of pit-houses during the winter. The shape of the armor also differed from the Hokkaido Ainu, with a unique combination of chest and waist armor.

The Sakhalin Ainu are also notable for their custom of mummification. Mummification is not practiced in the Okhotsk culture area, nor in the Ainu culture of Hokkaido. However, in northern Japan, the mummies of three generations of the Oshu Fujiwara clan, who are said to have controlled northern trade in the late Heian period, are preserved in Hiraizumi.

=== Social structure ===
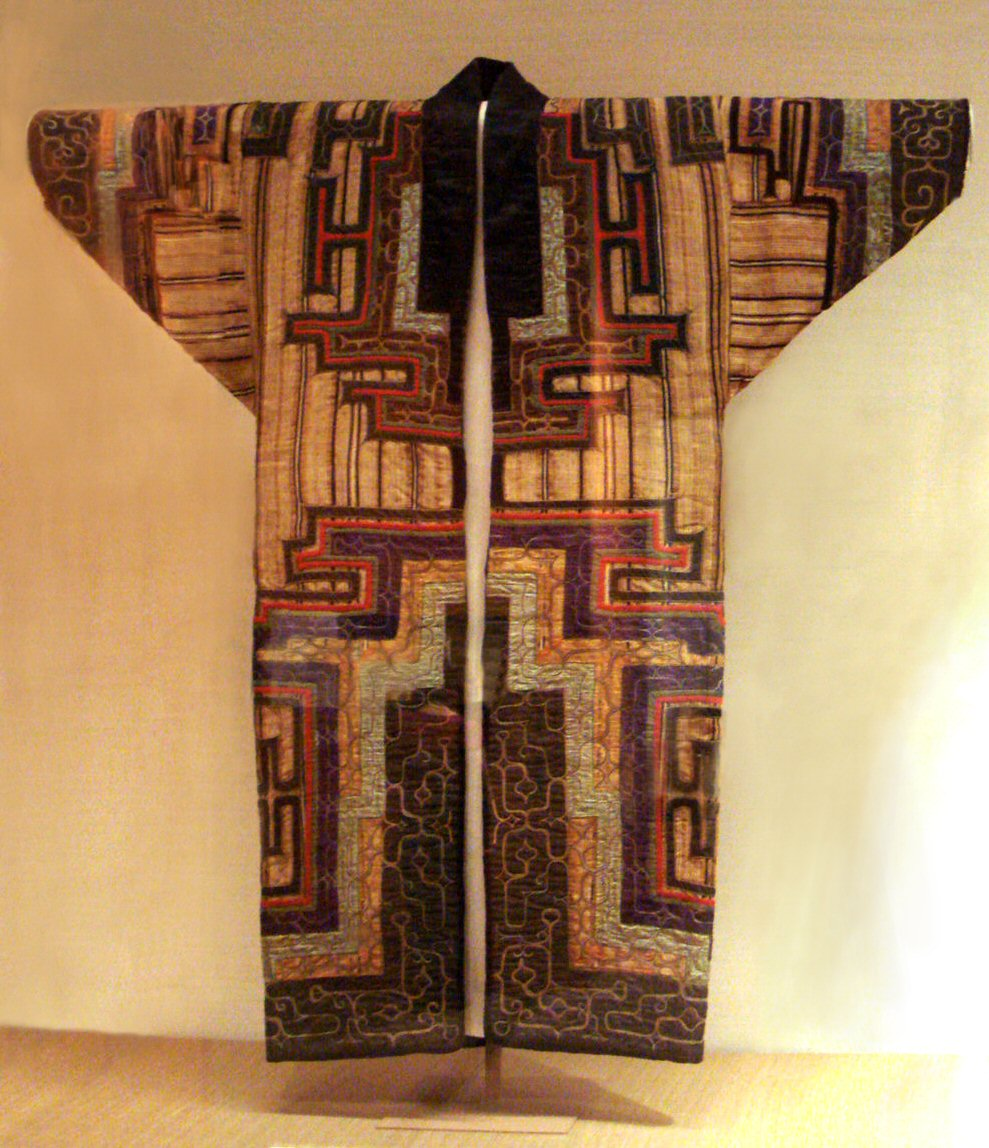
Ainu sundress (collection of the British Museum)

It is thought that the Ainu lived in social units called kotan (small village, usually five or six houses) when the Ainu culture was first established. Later, around the 15th century, the region became more culturally and politically integrated due to trade and conflicts between the Ainu and the Japanese, and by the 17th century, the Japanese had established a number of hunting and fishing settlements (iwor) around rivers called Sodaisho or Sotomyo. The Japanese lord mayor was a powerful ruler who politically integrated a large area comparable to the provinces of Japan or to a Chinese county. However, after Shakushain's revolt (1669 – 1672), which was partly caused by the division of the region into separate iwor, the political unity of the Ainu region was dismantled with the shift to the place contracting system.

The theory that Ainu society was a disparity society with extremely unequal distribution of wealth has been presented. Based on literature and the results of the excavation of tombs, Takuro Segawa has pointed out that early modern Ainu society was divided into four classes: the kamoi (chiefs), the nispa (lords and nobility), the commoners, and the usiune utare (slaves), with wealth concentrated in the kamoi.

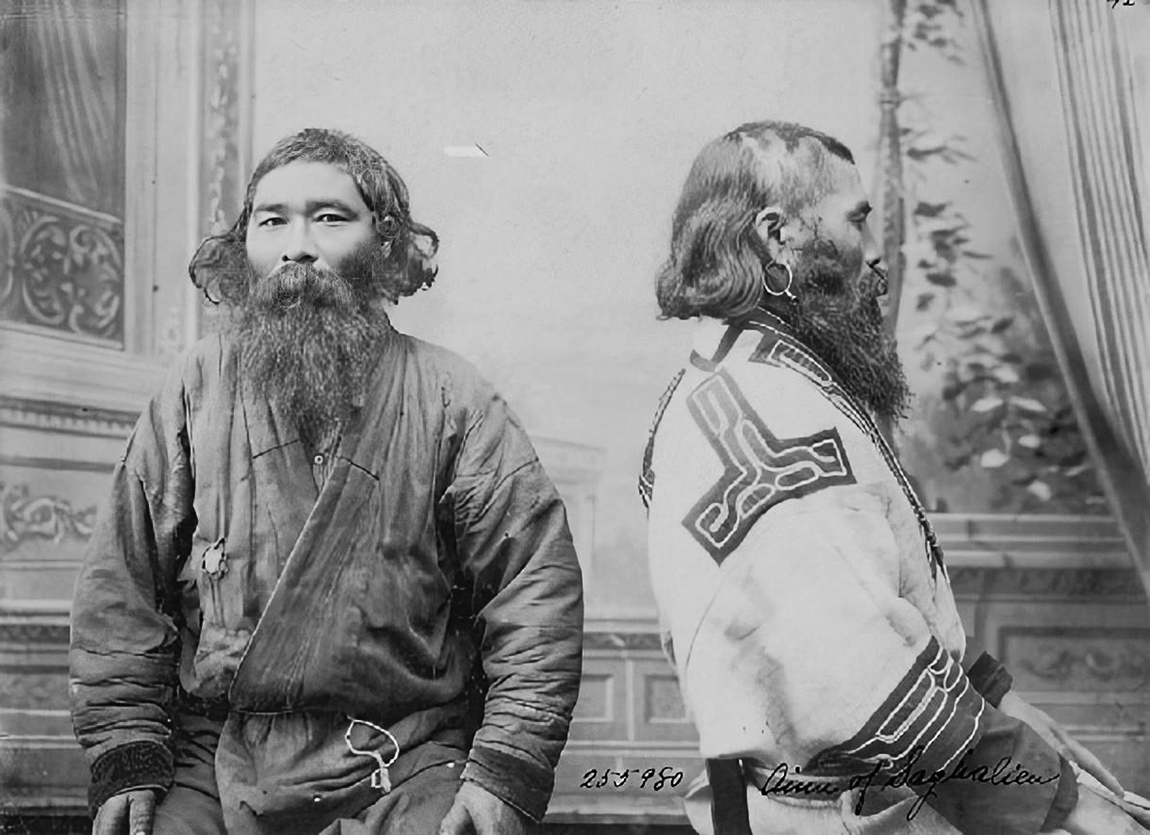
Portrait of two Ainu men in daily life clothing.

The Ainu were sometimes hostile to the Japanese. There was also periodic inter-Ainu warfare. In particular, the conflict between the Menasunkur Ainu (the eastern group) and the Sumunkur Ainu (the western group) was fierce, and there were battles that resulted in many deaths. Shakshain, the chief of the Menasunkuru clan who challenged the Matsumae clan, also fought and killed Onibishi, the chief of the Sumunkuru clan. They fought other inter-tribal battles, sometimes involving extensive travel.

=== Legal system ===
Disputes between kotan were decided on the merits in open discussions called carange, to prevent the disputes from escalating into violence. The debates took place in casi, or fortified compounds. In addition to this, the custom of saimon or "trial by ordeal" remained strong, and the outcome of such ordeals constituted a pact to settle a matter.

When a crime occurred in Ainu society, the village chief brought the defendant to justice at his own discretion. In general, adultery was punished by ear shaving or nose shaving, and theft was punished by caning with a club called a shuto, or by cutting the Achilles tendon. As the Ainu have never had a strong unified government, their laws and punishments have been greatly influenced by the authorities and the region, and if the village chief was mild, the guilty party was given lenient treatment, while if the chief was cruel, the guilty party was severely punished. There was no death penalty for the Hokkaido Ainu, but for serious crimes such as murder, some sentences were difficult to survive, such as being banished from the kotan after the Achilles tendon was severed. In Sakhalin Ainu society, murderers were sentenced to be buried alive along with the bodies of their victims

There is a theory that this kind of system was not understood by the Japanese, whose court system was developed during the Edo period and who established a modern judicial system after the Meiji Restoration. This failure to understand led to contempt for the Ainu.

=== Livelihood ===
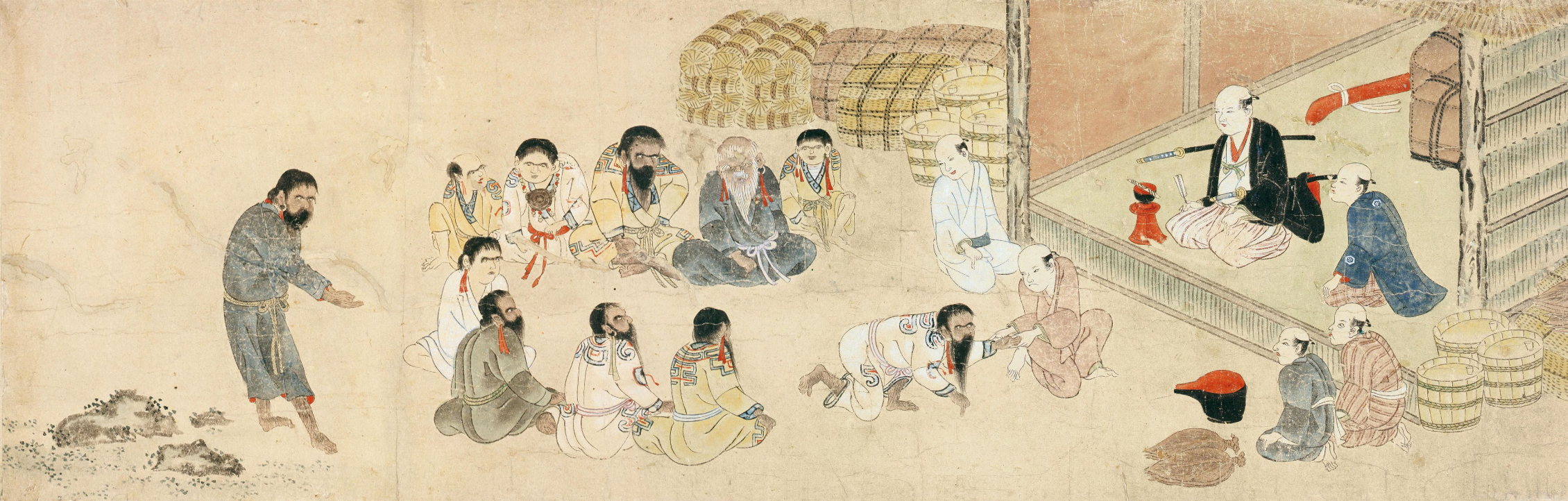
Scenes of Ainu fishing grounds by Kodama Teiryo (Ezo-no-kuni Gyoba)c.1751-64

Prior to the modern era, the Ainus' livelihood consisted of a combination of hunting, fishing, gathering (forest and marine), farming, and trading to secure the goods necessary for their livelihood. The chum salmon was called the kamui-chel (Lady's fish) or sipe (original food), and was regarded as a staple food and often dried. This was not only important as a self-sufficient food source but was also one of the main products that needed to be secured in large quantities for trade with the Japanese.

Farming was also practiced, but it was not the mainstay of their livelihood. However, this is not because farming was impossible. Farming was widely practiced during the Abramite culture, and many traces of fields from the Ainu culture have been discovered, such as the Takasago shell mound in Tōyako, Hokkaido, which was buried by the eruption of Mount Usu in 1663. It is also thought that the Ainu specialized in trading with the Japanese, for whom they obtained large quantities of trade goods such as salmon, animal skins, and raptor feathers. The cultivation of hiye (piyapa) has been practiced since ancient times, and it was used to brew an alcoholic beverage similar to nigori sake called "tonoto," which was used in rituals. In addition, foxtail millet (munchiro) and proso millet (mengku) were cultivated. These were called chisassuyep when cooked into rice, and sayo when cooked into porridge. Starch collected and preserved in bulk from the bulb (scale) of the giant lily (tulais), and the residue after collecting the starch, was fermented and dried, and was also one of the staple foods. Because of this tradition of starch use, when the potato was introduced, it was immediately accepted.

When the Revolt of Shakushain, which was caused by the Shoba Chigyo system, ended in defeat, and the location contracting system was established, people were mobilized to work as servants for the location contractors (Japanese merchants who also acted as administrators), as well as to sell handicrafts and work at fishing grounds.

=== Religion ===
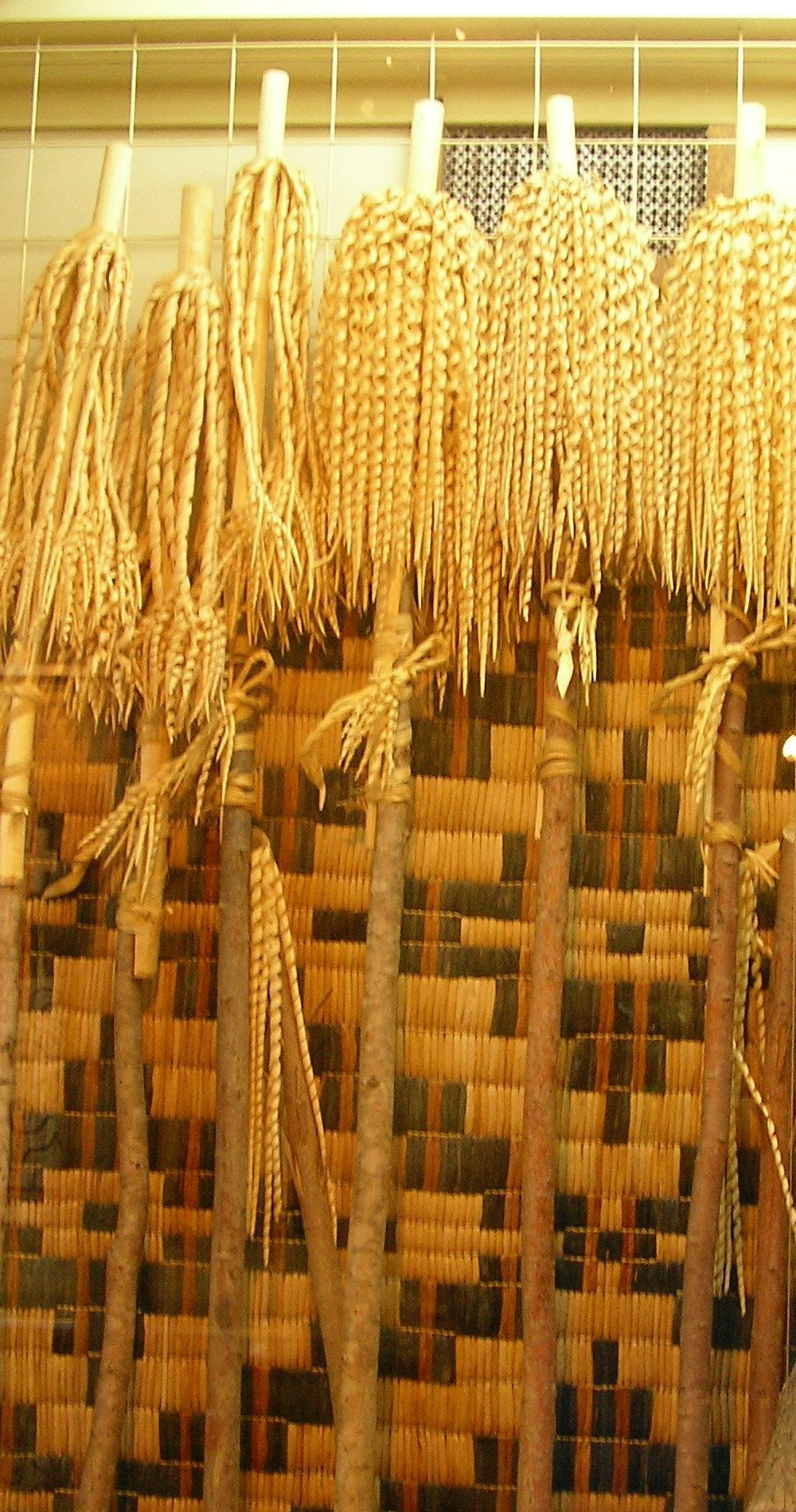
Ceremonial implements called inau, in the Kayano Shigeru Nibutani Ainu Museum

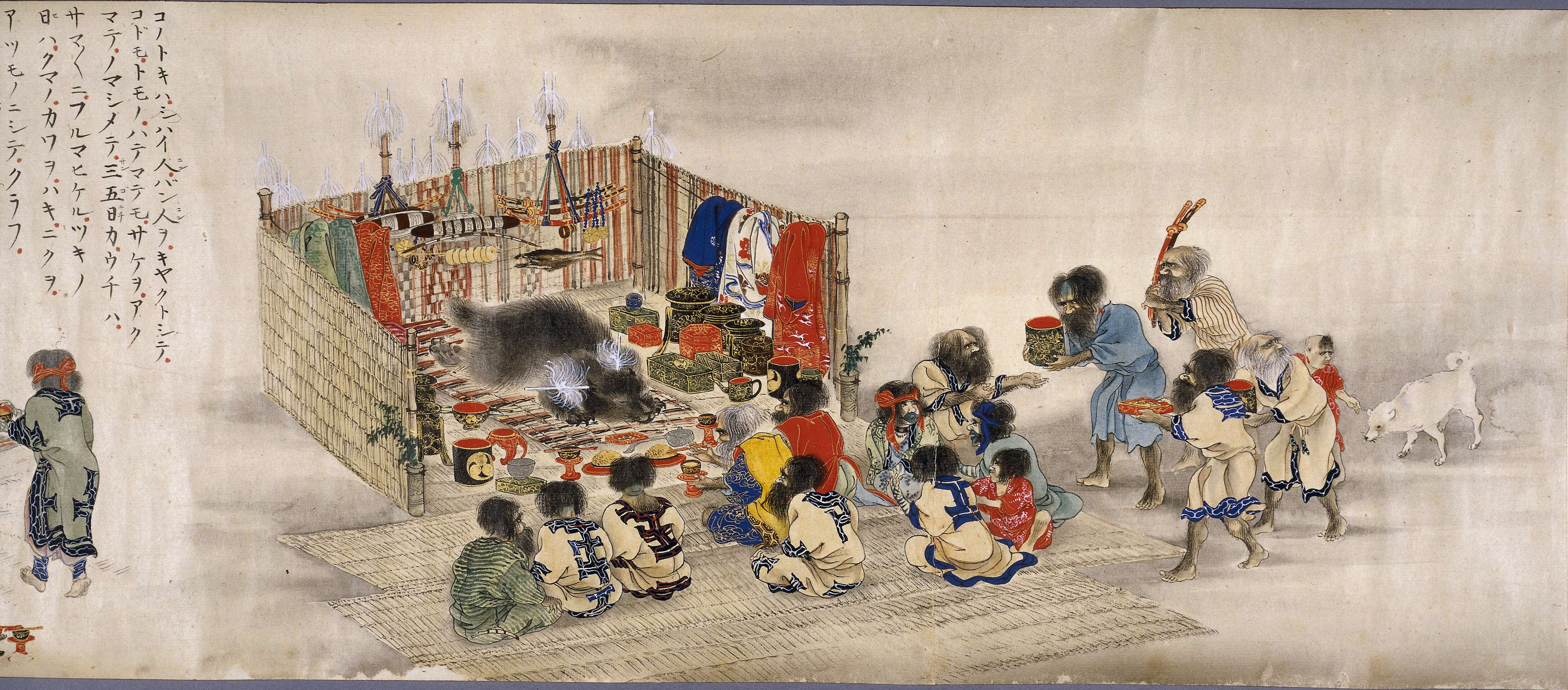
Ainu bear sacrifice, 1870 painting (British Museum)

The pre-modern Ainu religion is categorized as animism. They believed that animals, plants, tools, natural phenomena (tsunamis, earthquakes, etc.), and pestilence all had their own spirituality and that these things were inhabited by spirits called "ramak". The world was divided into the present world (Ainu Mosii company) and the world inhabited by lamats (Kamuimoshiri company), and lamats were believed to inhabit various things and came to Ainu Mosii with some kind of role. It was interpreted that Ramak would return to Kamuimoshishin after fulfilling his role. The Ainu gods were not absolute transcendents, and when Kamui acted unjustly, the Ainu would protest.

The Iomante, the best-known Ainu religious ritual, was not found during the Abramian period but was found in the Okhotsk culture, which existed adjacent to the Abramian culture during the Abramian period. It has been speculated that it was probably introduced into the Ainu culture from the Okhotsk culture sphere via the Tobinitai culture. On the other hand, archaeologist Takuro Segawa, in light of the fact that Wild boar bones and Dogū clay figurines resembling wild boars, which are not native to Hokkaido, have been unearthed at sites from the Jomon and Zoku-Jōmon period In light of the fact that bones of wild boars and clay figures resembling wild boars have been unearthed, we can conclude that "there existed a ritual in the Japanese archipelago during the Jomon period in which wild boars were raised for a certain period of time and their souls were sent away. The Jomon people of Hokkaido and the following Jomon people also introduced wild boar piglets and imitated this ritual, and eventually, the wild boar was replaced by the brown bear, which is the Iomanthe. The Ainu do not have idolatry, nor do they have a culture of making idols.

This Iomanthe is meant to entertain Ramak, who has come to Ainu Mossi Lai in the form of a bear to deliver bear meat and bear fur. A feast is held, and souvenirs are given for Ramak to take back to Ramak's world.

The Ainu ritual is called Kamuinomi, and is performed to various gods, but when starting Kamuinomi, the first prayer is to the fire god apehuti Kamui. This is an act of rooting for the other gods through the fire gods who are close to humans. Wooden money called Inau, which is processed from white wood, is used for the Kamuinomi. The rituals are performed by men, and women are responsible for the preparations.

The bodies of the dead are buried in a cemetery in the mountains away from the kotan. The cemetery is not located across the river from the village because carrying the body over the river is considered disrespectful to the water god. The grave markers are wooden stakes called Irurakamui (gods who carry them) and Kwa (staffs), made of wood that does not decay easily, such as enju and hashidoi. In Shizunai-cho, male grave markers are Y-shaped and female grave markers are T-shaped. The concept of a "cemetery" is said to have existed around the mid-17th century. There are considerable differences between the grave system of the Abramite culture, where burials took place around or inside the house.

Russian Orthodox Churches were built in the settlement of Shikotan near Hokkaido, where the Tishima Ainu, who had lived close to the Russian culture (in Uramori and Shinchi counties), migrated during the Meiji era. There are also reports that the Russian Orthodox Church proselytized to the remaining Sakhalin Ainu and others who had acquired Sakhalin from Japan through the unequal treaty in the Shogunate and early Meiji periods. However, only a few converts were reported, and those were ridiculed as "Ntsa Ainu" (Russian Ainu) by other Ainu.

The southern part of Sakhalin, which was returned to Japan by the Treaty of Portsmouth signed in 1905 as a result of the victory in the Russo-Japanese War, has seen 336 of the Sakhalin Ainu who emigrated to Hokkaido in the early Meiji era return to their homeland. In addition, Buddhism spread to the Sakhalin Ainu along with Japanese language education. However, it is reported that many Ainu still followed the ancient beliefs of Kamui. In addition, since the Meiji era, missionaries such as John Batchelor, who wanted to evangelize the Ainu, were allowed to spread Christianity in Japan with some conditions.

According to an interview with Ainu conducted by Hokkaido University in 2012, the Ainu today primarily have Buddhism as their family religion.

=== Dwellings ===
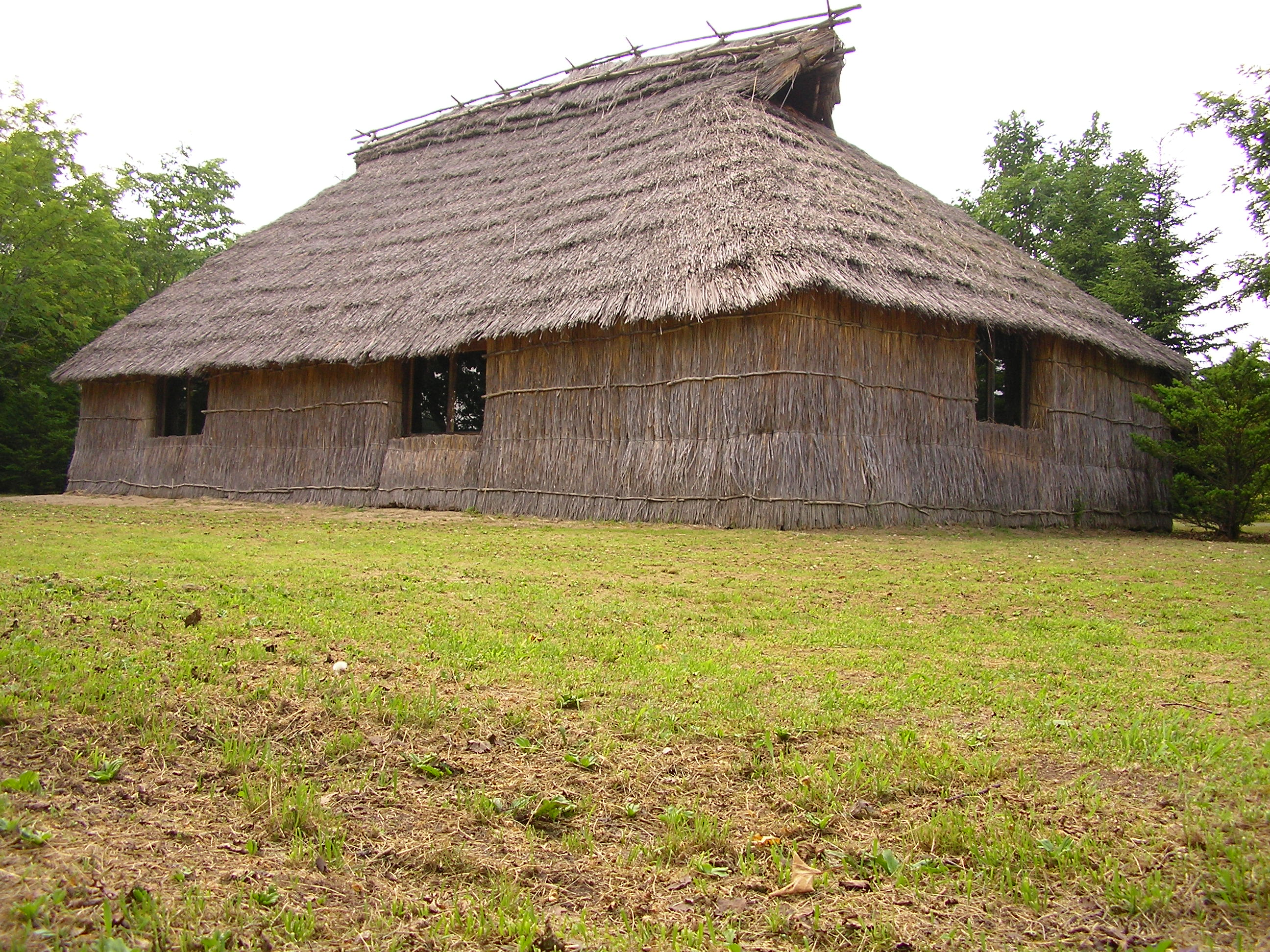
Cise restored at the Museum of Ainu Culture, Hiratori Town

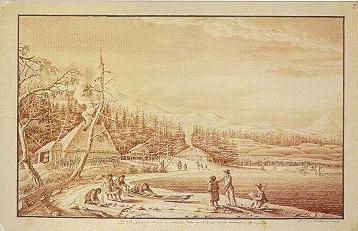
Painting of a cise from 1805

In the past, Ainu dwellings were unique dugout pillar buildings called cise. The basic structure consisted of dug-up pillars, a roof thatched with bark or reeds, and walls with few openings also made of bark or reeds, but the details differed from region to region. For example, from the Oshima Peninsula to Shiraoi, the thatched ki-kitai-cise found from the Oshima Peninsula to Shiraoi, the reed-thatched siariki-kitai-cise found from Shiraoi to Tokachi and Kunashir Island, and the bark-thatched yaara kitai cise found from Tokachi to Kunashir Island. The maximum area of a cise is thought to be about 100 square meters. The dwellings built on flat land are distinct from the pit dwellings that were the main type of dwelling from the Jōmon period through to the Satsumon culture. Although pit dwellings were preserved among the Ainu of the Kuril Islands and the Ainu living in the north, there is only one site in Hokkaido where flat-land structures and pit dwellings are mixed, the Sapporo k528 site, which is believed to be from the Satsumon culture.

The interior of a cise was usually a square room. There was a hearth inside, and a window on the back of the upper part in front of the hearth for the kamui (god) to enter and leave. On the outside of the cise, there was an epereset (a cage for keeping bear cubs), a pu (pantry), and an asinru (toilet). A few to a dozen of these cises formed a village called a kotan.

In addition to cise, Ainu villages often also had areas called casi, also known as chashi from the adoption of the term into Japanese. Casi are thought to have been built between the 16th and 18th centuries. There are many unanswered questions about the purpose of their construction, but they may have been defensive fortresses, treasuries, sanctuaries for ceremonies, or places for people to view some performance or ritual. So far, more than 500 casi sites have been found in Hokkaido.

=== Treasures ===
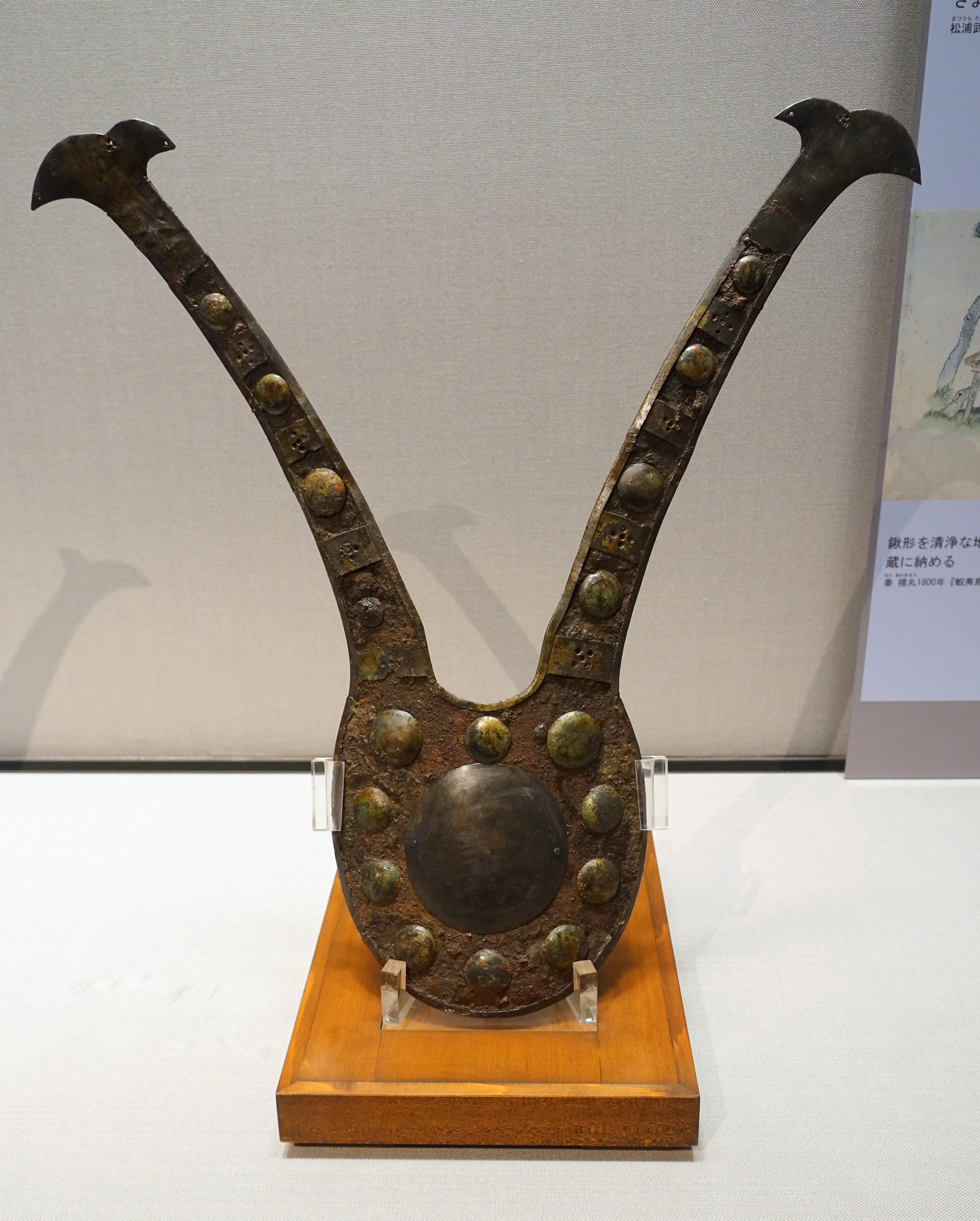
An Ainu hoe in the collection of the Tokyo National Museum. In Ainu language, it is called "kirau starting tamikami" (horned treasure god)

Before the modern era, the Ainu prized as treasure some of the items they acquired from other cultures through trade. The Ainu treasures included swords such as the Ainu sword, silverware, Chinese silk fabrics (Ezo brocade), lacquerware, and feathers of birds of prey.

The most prized item by the Ainu was a metal tool called a hoe. These were made of iron or brass plates about 1 to 2 millimeters thick, processed into a V-shape, and decorated with lacquer, leather, or silver plating fittings. This is thought to have been some kind of spell tool and was valued not because of the high cost of the raw materials or the difficulty of manufacturing and processing, but because of the powerful spiritual power that was thought to reside in this object. Treasures other than the hoe-shaped objects were circulated among influential Ainu people as rare goods, just like the stone coins of Yap Island, but the hoe-shaped objects were never given away to others, and when their owners died, they were hidden in hidden places such as behind rocks, lost and decayed. .

In 1916, four of the seven hoe-shaped objects found in Kakuda Village, Yubari County (now Kuriyama-cho) are preserved in the Tokyo National Museum.

=== Trade ===
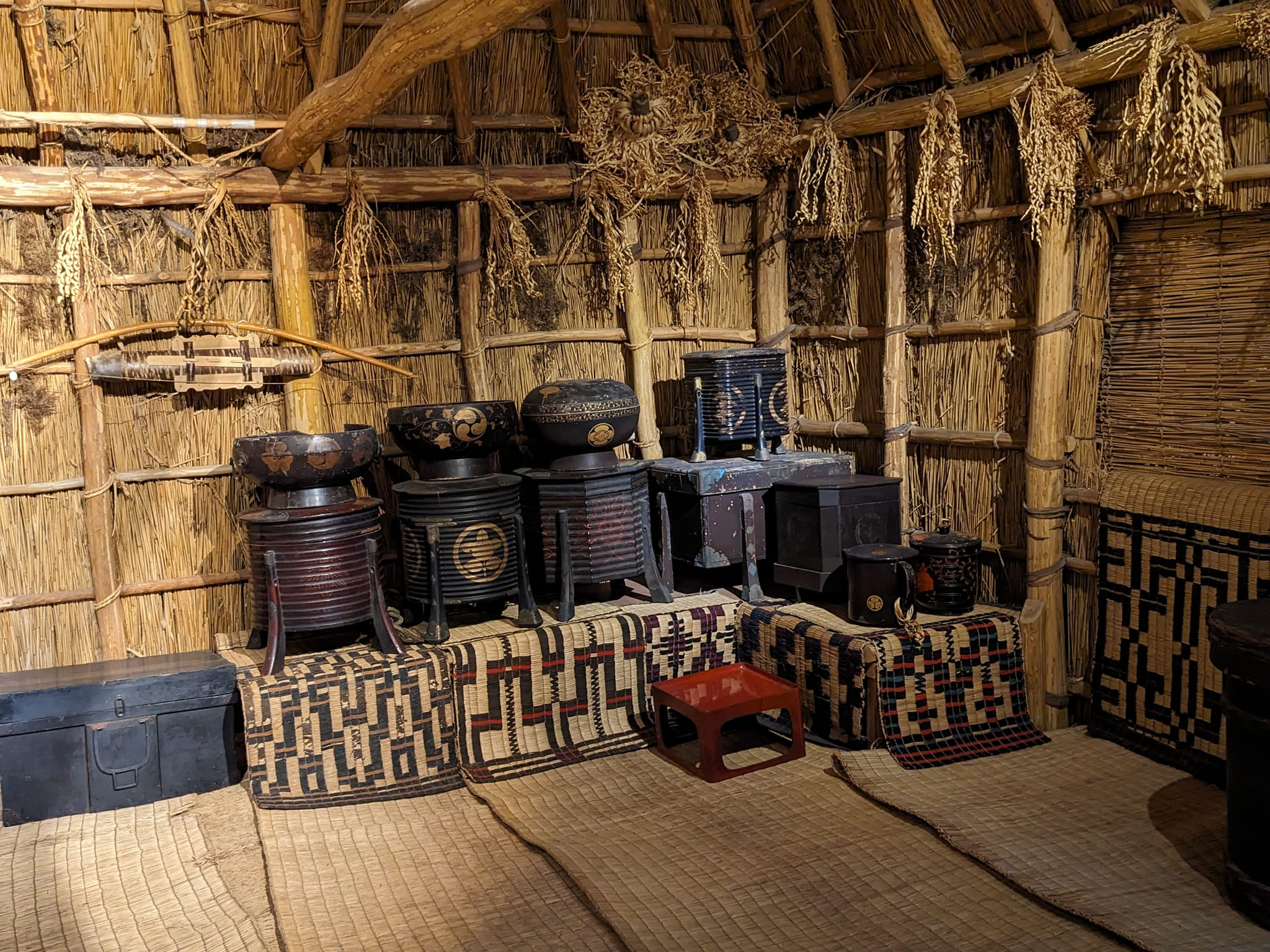
Lacquerware displayed in the iyoiki gallery inside the cise (Hokkaido Museum)

In the Middle Ages, the Ainu traded dried salmon, bear and sea animal pelts, and raptor feathers for Japanese luxury goods such as silk fabrics and lacquerware. In order to secure salmon as trade goods, there were also villages that specialized in salmon fishing as their livelihood. This kind of trading economy was established around the middle of the ninth century and was inherited by the Ainu culture.

Before the 13th century, the Ainu had expanded to the mouth of the Amur River and Lake Kisi. In the "Preface to the Book of Genesis" cited in the Genbunrui, there is a description of the Ainu attacking the Nivkh people around the 13th century and later fighting the Mongol Empire. Some believe that this was to abduct the raptor feather collectors that existed in Nivkh . The Mongol Empire invaded Sakhalin in response to appeals from Nivkh and the Gilemi, who lived from the lower Amur River basin to Sakhalin, causing conflicts based on trade. The Yuan invasion forced many Ainu to leave Sakhalin, but the trade using the Amur River continued.

It is thought that the luxury goods brought by the Japanese were possessed by the wealthy as treasures and that pedantic consumption of these goods secured collateral their authority within the tribe.

The Abe clan of the Heian period, the Northern Fujiwara clan, the Oshu Fujiwara clan, and the Ando clan, which had a navy in the Middle Ages, were among the Ou clan's Primorskaya Oblast in the Medieval Period, which was carried out by the Ando clan and other powerful Ou clans with naval forces. The Matsumae clan, through the intermediary of the Ainu, traded Japanese iron products and lacquerware in Ezo (Karafuto and Sōya) for silk fabrics, iron products, and glass beads, including official Qing dynasty uniforms, brought by the visiting Primorsky people. They also exchanged iron products, glass beads, and other items.

=== Oral literature ===
The Ainu have a tradition of oral literature called yukar. The tradition of yukar chanting temporarily declined after the modern era, but a movement to preserve it is now underway.

=== Clothing ===
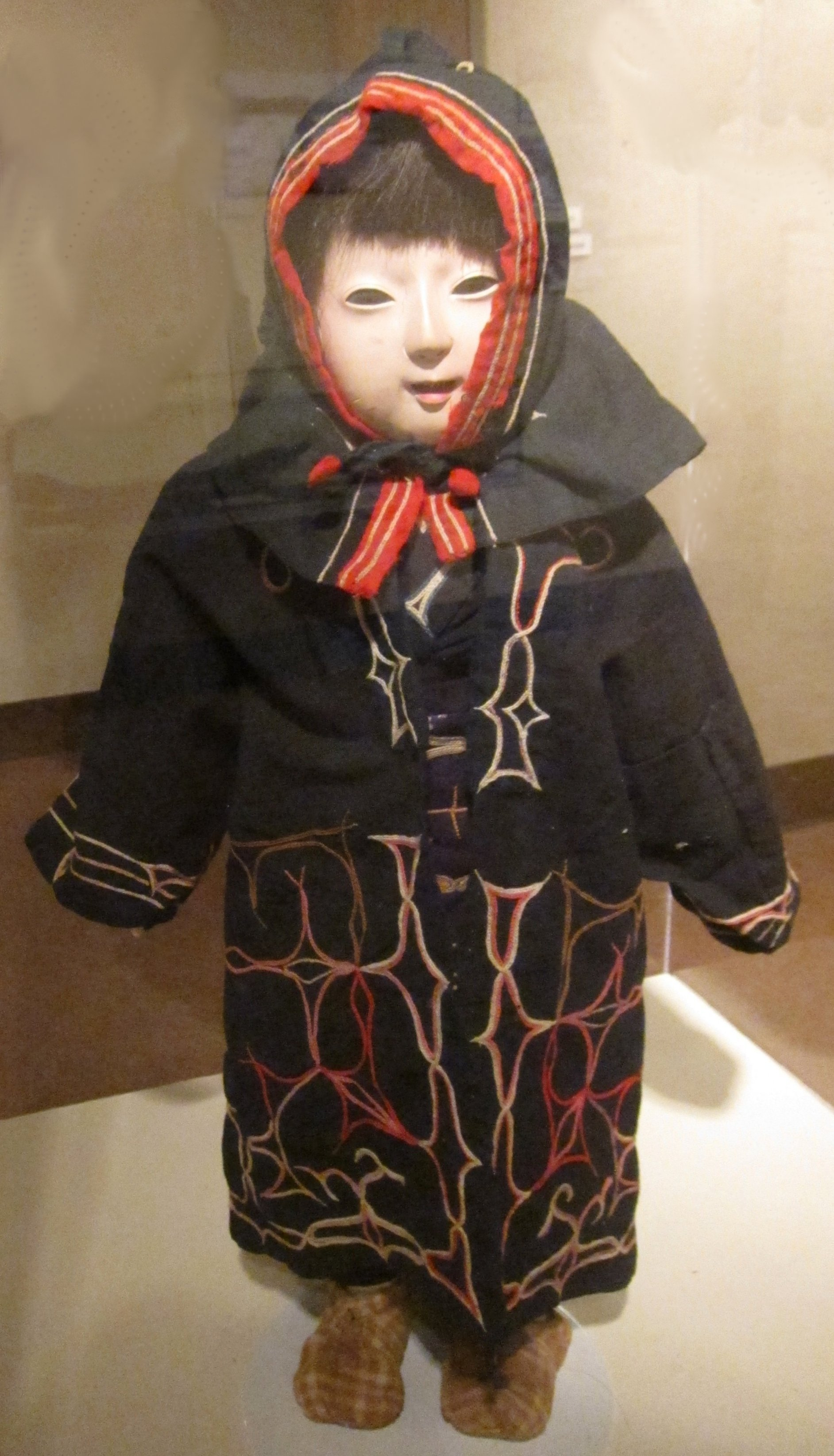
A reproduction of an Ainu girl. She wears a konci (hood) on her head. The costume is made of cotton fabric with embroidered patterns and is called cikiribe.

Men wear a tepa (a loincloth) and then a jacket. Women wear a sacred girdle or belt, called a raun kut ("under belt") or upsoro kut ("inner belt") on the lower abdomen. This garment traces the woman's matrilineal line. To cover the upper body, a T-shirt-like undergarment that extends down to the knees is worn, and then a jacket. Depending on the temperature of the weather, they may also wear tekunpe (literally "hand-on things", i.e. gloves or mittens), a konci (hood), or hos (leggings). During ceremonies, men wear a sapanpe (crown) on their heads, and women wear a matanpushi (an embroidered headband). Sakhalin Ainu women wear hetmuye, a headdress made of cloth wrapped in a ring, on their heads during rituals.

Traditional Ainu clothing appears similar in tailoring to the Japanese kimono, but features tubular sleeves and no gussets; garments are also single-layered.

There are two types of jackets: grass skin jackets such as tetarabe and utarbe made from nettle or hemp fiber, and haori-like jackets made from fur from animals like the earless seal, or skin from fish like the salmon or itou. In addition, a strong garment called attus, which is made from Ainu bark cloth, has become common since the 17th century. In addition, a large amount of cotton clothing was brought in by the Japanese, and kosode and jinwaori became established as ceremonial clothing. Silk costumes were also imported from China through the Shantan trade, and were worn in various ways. The silk costumes were sold to the Japanese as Ezo Nishiki (蝦夷錦) or "Ezo silk", and attus material was also brought outside of Hokkaido and processed into clothing.

=== Jewelry ===
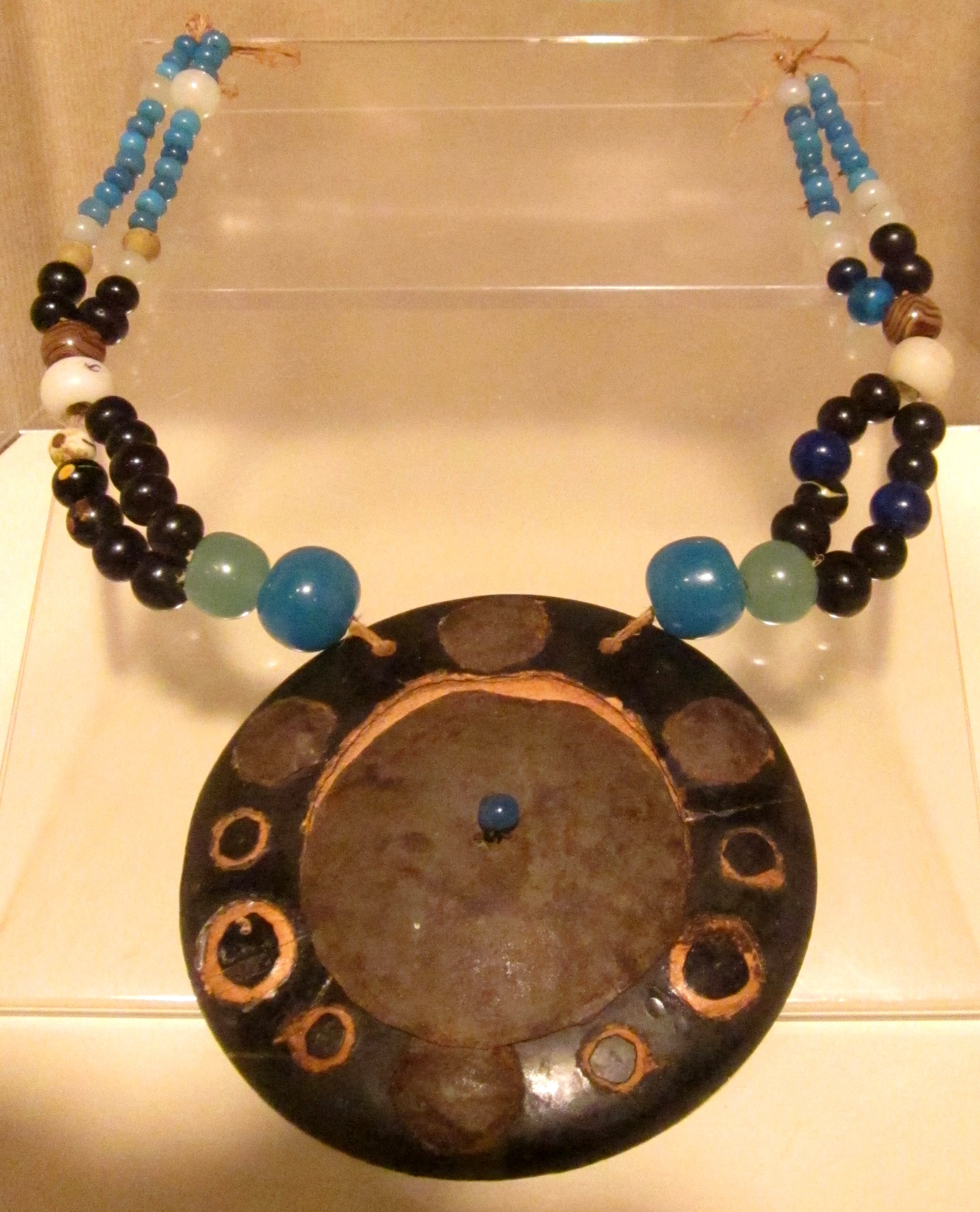
A tamasai (bead necklace). Consists of a string of pierced glass beads obtained from the Santan trade, and at the center, a metal plate called a sitoki.

The trinkets of the Ainu are mainly metalware, such as ninkari (earrings), rekutunpe (choker, literally "throat-on thing"), tamasai (bead necklace), and tekunkane (ring or bracelet, literally "hand-on metal").

In the Ainu culture, where hunting and gathering were the mainstays, farming was only a secondary element, and the development of metalware technology was limited. Therefore, rather than blacksmithing, which involved extracting, forging, and smelting metals from ores, craftsmen developed techniques to modify, repair, and reuse existing metalware. The majority of these items, with the exception of the ninkari, were made exclusively for women, and like the makiri (knives for men) and tasiro (mountain swords similar to machetes), which were given male privileges, the kem (sewing needles) and cispo (needle cases), which were used for clothing, food, and shelter, and the shu (iron pots and pans) and menoko makiri (knives for women), which were used for food, were also given strict female privileges.

=== Tattoos ===
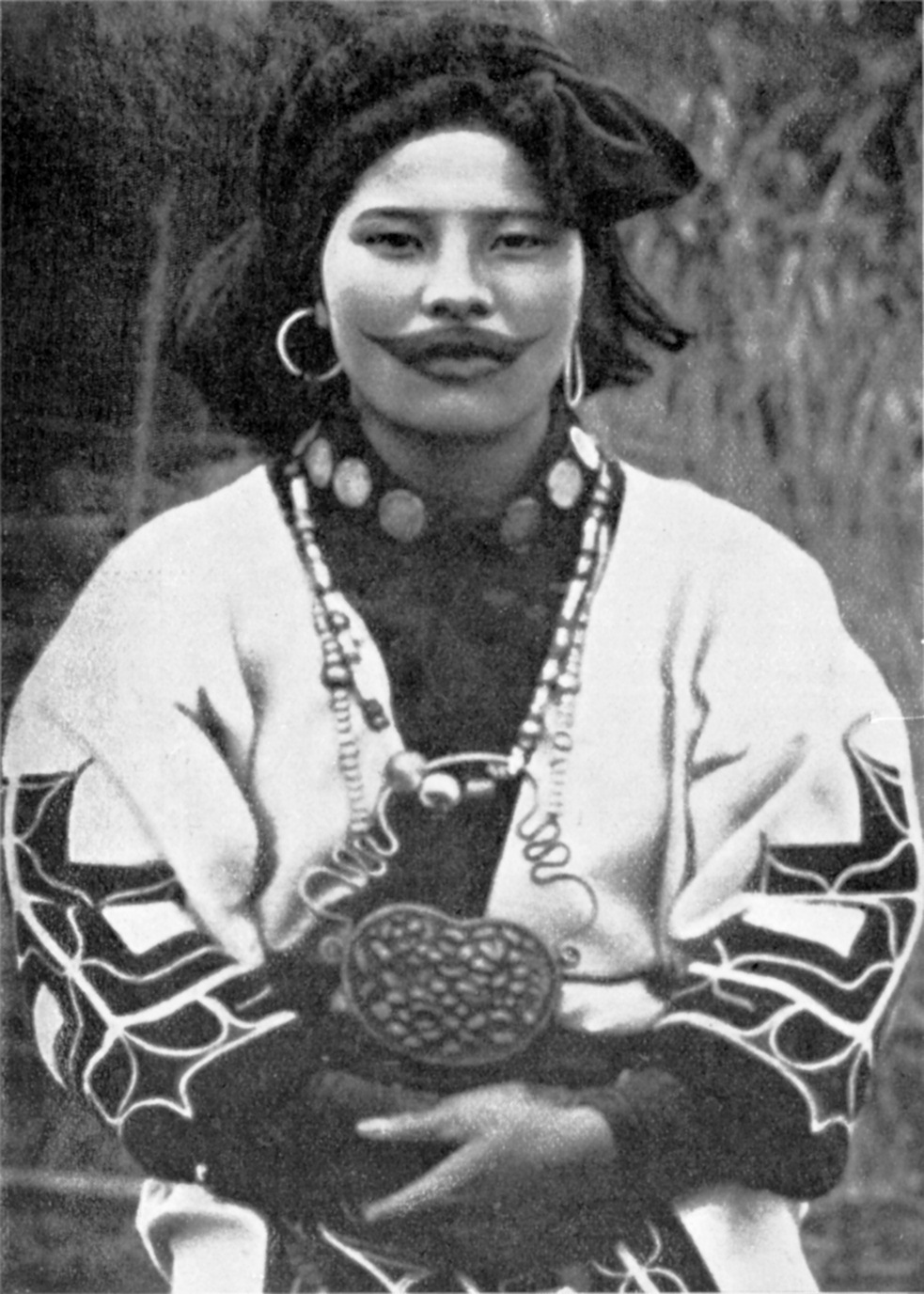
A woman with tattoos around her mouth. She wears ninkali (earrings) in her ears, a lektumpe (necklace) around her neck, and a tamasai (necklace) down her neck

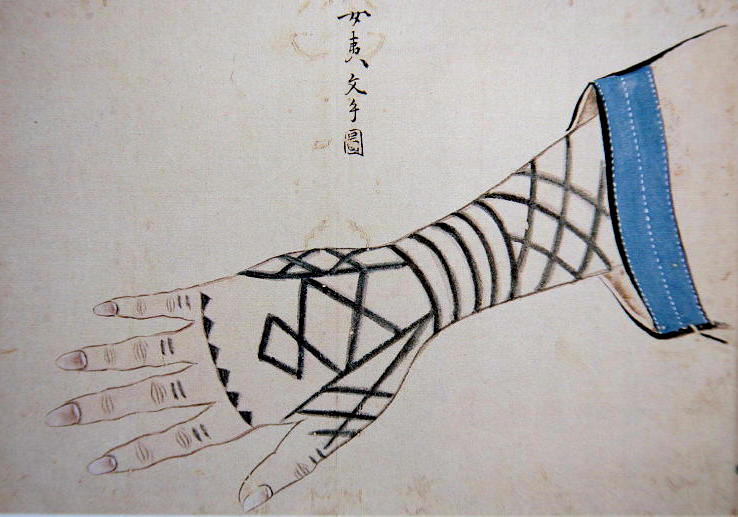
Traditional tattoo patterns of Ainu women

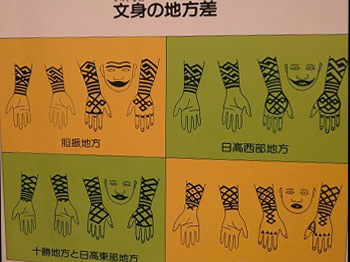
Traditional tattoo patterns of Ainu women, with regional differences

Tattoos were an important symbol of the gods associated with the belief in spirits. The traditional tattoo around the mouth of an adult Ainu woman is thought to resemble a beard, but some believe it resembles the mouth of a sacred snake.

When this traditional tattoo is applied, the mouth of the young woman is wiped clean and disinfected with hot water infused with the bark of alder. The tip of a mantis (small knife) is used to make fine scratches, and soot is rubbed in. Because the procedure is quite painful, the tattoo is applied in small increments, several times. Philipp Franz von Siebold, a German physician and naturalist living in Japan, went to the Ainu village of Hiratori, Ryusha-gun, Hokkaido, and found that "Ainu tattooing is done only on women, and begins with multiple horizontal wounds made with a small knife just above the upper lip of girls as young as seven or eight years old, where the soot is rubbed in. Once the tattoo around the mouth is done, the back of the hand and forearm are tattooed. Once a woman is married, she is no longer tattooed.

In the case of men, there were also various tattooing customs in different regions. In some areas, men got tattoos on their shoulders, and in other areas, men got tattoos on their hands, which were said to improve their archery skills and make them better hunters.

The custom of tattooing was seen as strange by the Japanese and was banned by the Tokugawa shogunate and the Meiji Restoration government. The Meiji Restoration and the Edo Shogunate enacted a ban on tattoos in October 1871, but it was not very effective because Ainu women at the time believed that if they did not have tattoos, they would incur the wrath of the gods and would not be able to marry. Therefore, in September 1876, the law was changed to imposing punishment and suppressing religious freedom. Siebold recorded that he was asked by the Ainu people, who were bewildered by the Meiji government's ban on tattoos if he could approach them to object to the ban.(?when? Siebold died in 1866).

In modern times, some Ainu women paint their mouths black as face painting, especially at important events.

The custom of tattooing flourished in Japan during the Jōmon and Yayoi (until around Umataikoku) and fell into disuse in Japanese society with the Yamatization (Yamato Court). It remained a custom in Ezo but disappeared as they assimilated into Japanese society. In Amami and Ryukyu, the custom remained until the modern era. The custom of tattooing women's faces has been revived among the Māori people in modern-day New Zealand, but tattoos specific to the Ainu people have been limited to temporary tattoos applied for specific events.

=== Calendar ===
The Ainu did not use a written calendar, but instead had an orally handed down calendar.

- Paikal (spring) Hunting for Kimun Kamui (Ezo brown bear), which has awakened from hibernation. Forage for Makayo (butterbur), Pukusa (Gyoja garlic), and Chirai (Itou).
- Saku (summer) Collecting and processing tulep (bulbs of the giant lily), soaking nipesh (endocarp of linden) and ack (halibut skin) in hot springs (or ponds if not available) to remove the fibers.
- Chuk (autumn) Fishing for Kamui chep (salmon).
- Mata (winter) Hunting for yuk (Ezo deer), moyuk (Ezo raccoon dog), and isopo (rabbit).

=== Written language ===
The Ainu language does not have its own writing system, and traditions were passed down orally. During the Meiji era, the Ainu continued to use the "tying rope" for arithmetic and record keeping. Similar customs include straw calculation in Okinawa, Fuxi Xi knots in East Asia, and the Quipu system among the Inca of South America. There was a rumor or myth among the Japanese that the Ainu could not count, but this is not true.

It is possible that the Japanese, such as the Matsumae clan, intentionally refrained from teaching the written language to the Ainu for political reasons, fearing that their misdeeds would be written down. There is also the view that the Ainu did not accept the use of the written language from them for cultural reasons. For this reason, the Ainu did not record themselves in writing or compile books until schooling was made compulsory during the Meiji era. Therefore, records of the pre-Meiji Ainu culture are mainly found in books written from a Japanese perspective.

Currently, the Ainu language has been devised to be transcription using Katakana or the Roman alphabet. The Ainu script is sometimes referred to as the Hokkaido variant script found on ancient artifacts in Hokkaido, but academics do not support the theory that the Ainu had a script.

=== Musical instruments ===
Traditional Ainu musical instruments include Palalaiki (Balalaika). Tonkori, Uma Tonkori (Matoukoto), Kacho (Drum), Mukkuri (mouth harp).

In addition, there are studies that suggest that Genzo may have been a tonkori. In addition, Ueda Akinari, a Japanese scholar of the mid-Edo period, painted a self-portrait of himself playing tonkori.

=== Patterns ===
The Ainu used traditional patterns to decorate their clothing and tools. It is thought that these patterns may have existed at the time of the establishment of Ainu culture around the 13th century. There was also an influx of designs in the exchange with northern peoples such as the Nivkhs, such as the spiral pattern.

In particular, the "aishiroshi" engraved on arrowheads had a role similar to that of a household crest.

=== Technology ===
Since the Ainu did not have ironworking technology, they mainly obtained iron for their ornaments and various tools from the Japanese. Although they could not manufacture advanced iron products, they knew how to repair them, and there were blacksmiths who restored iron objects. Some of these blacksmiths settled in villages, while others traveled from village to village. However, with the massive influx of iron from Honshu in the early modern period, the need to reuse old iron products diminished, and these blacksmiths are thought to have gradually disappeared.

The dugout canoes were used for fishing and trading. There was a culture of decorating woodwork, such as sword sheaths. Wooden bears were carved by Yoshichika Tokugawa in 1923 at a farm in Nikkai-gun Yakumo-cho, which was settled by former the Owari Domain. It was not a traditional craft, but Ainu participated in it because it provided cash income.

== Modern history ==
=== Edo period ===
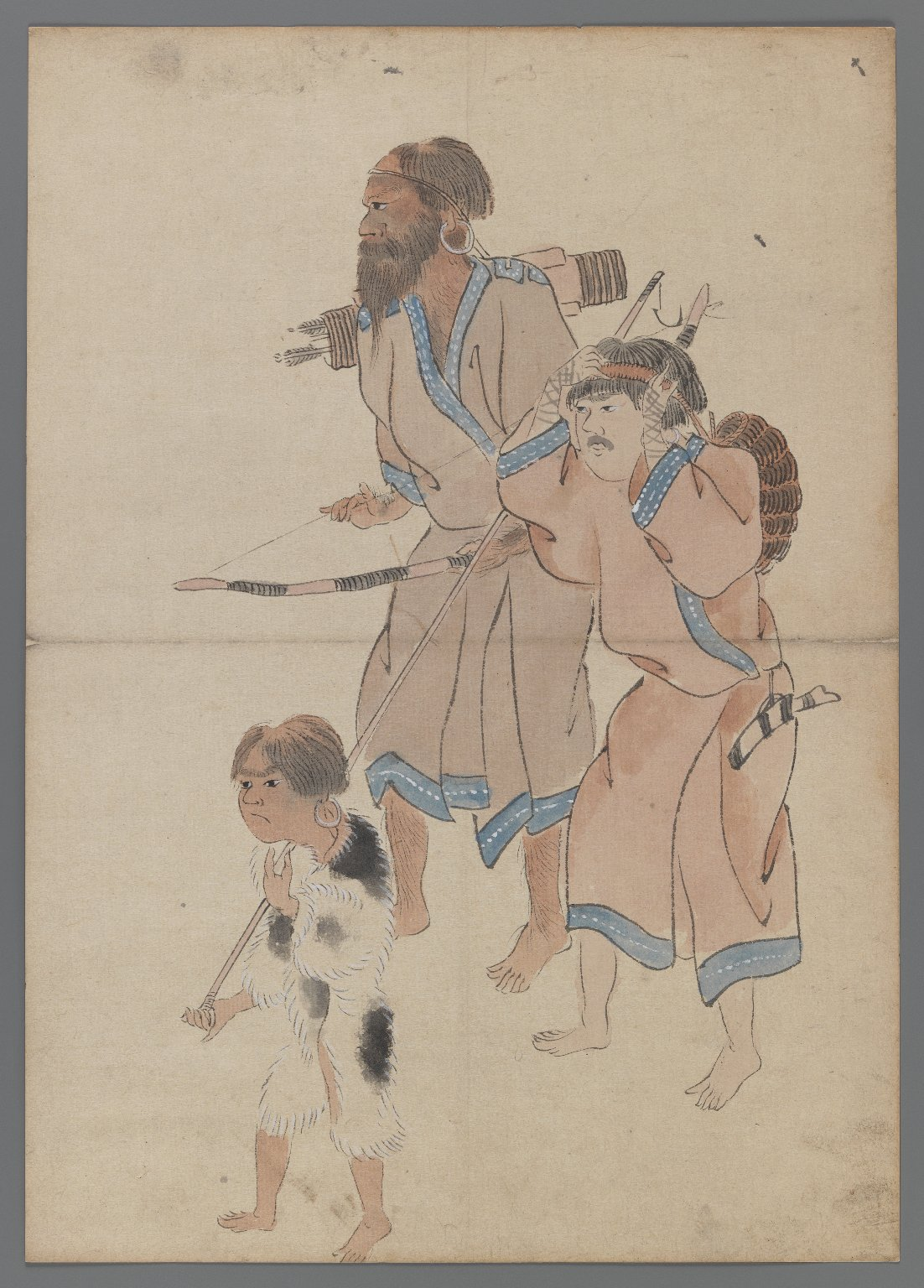
Ainu Hunters painting, artist unknown, painted between 1800 and 1899

From the beginning of the Edo period, Ezochi, including Hokkaido, Sakhalin, and Chishima, was divided into about 80 places, which were known to vassals and became the domain of the Matsumae clan. In 1799, Eastern Ezochi was given to the Tokugawa shogunate and with the Matsumae family's Yanagawa transfer in 1807, the Ezochi and Wajinchi became natural domains. In 1821, all of Ezochi and Wakinchi were restored to the Matsumae domain. When Hakodate was opened in 1855, it became a natural domain again in 1856, leaving a part of Wakinchi in the southwestern part of Oshima Peninsula.

The policy of the Matsumae domain was that the Ainu should "not be influenced by the culture of Japan", and the Ainu did not use the Japanese language or accessories like the kasa (hat), mino (straw cape), or zori (sandals), or other Japanese-style clothing. However, when the territory came under the direct control of the Edo shogunate, the ban on wearing hats, coats, and sandals, which had been forbidden by the Matsumae clan, was lifted. At the same time, the Shogunate recommended changing their hairstyle, clothes, and names to the Japanese style. However, it did not become very popular.

=== Assimilation ===
In 1869, the Kaitakushi was established by the Meiji government, which created family registers (Jinshin family registers) for Ainu living in Hokkaido, Sakhalin, and the Northern Territories in the same way as for the Japanese. Pioneers provided the same school education, including language, as the Japanese, and the laws that were enforced (the order to cut hair and remove swords, and the order requiring the name of the commoner's family name) were uniformly applied to the Ainu, just as they were to the Japanese. As part of the civilization effort, traditional Ainu culture such as tattoos and iomantes were banned, along with traditional Japanese culture such as the chonmage hairstyle and carrying swords, in the name of modernization. In addition, in 1875, the Meiji government concluded the Karafuto-Chishima Exchange Treaty with Russia, and the Karafuto Ainu who had chosen Japanese nationality moved to Hokkaido, while those who wished to remain remained there. On the other hand, the Chishima Ainu were persuaded by officials of Nemuro Prefecture to move to Shikotan Island due to problems with the supply of daily commodities and for reasons of national defense ("Chishima Cruise Diary").

Isabella Bird also visited Hokkaido during her travels in Japan from June to September 1878, and left a description of Ainu life and customs at the time in her book Unbeaten Tracks in Japan.

=== Hokkaido Old Native Protection Act ===
In 1899, the Hokkaido Law for the Protection of the Former Native People of Hokkaido was enacted, and with the establishment of Ainu schools, Ainu children were required to attend different schools than their Japanese counterparts. The Meiji government also promoted Japanese language education for the Ainu. However, the Ainu language and culture were not taught in these schools, and the Ainu culture was negatively represented, further destroying the Ainu culture in the early modern period. In 1937, the Hokkaido Law for the Protection of the Former Native People of Hokkaido was amended, and Ainu schools were abolished.

Although there were researchers of Ainu culture, prejudice persisted, with even Kyōsuke Kindaichi, who left behind a vast amount of material on the Ainu language and culture, viewing the Ainu as a people to be destroyed. This situation continued until Japan's defeat in World War II.

=== Ainu cultural studies ===
A dictionary of the Ainu language was published by John Batchelor, an English missionary, and Shujiro Ekuho (Japanese) (1849–1924), who became a teacher at the Harukoto Ainu School (established in 1891). Together, they compiled the Ainu Zasshiroku (Ainu Miscellaneous Records). The Ainu language has been studied and documented academically. Major researchers include Yukie Chiri, who recorded and translated Yukara, Mashiho Chiri, and Kyōsuke Kindaichi (1882–1971). In the study of Sakhalin Ainu culture, Bronisław Piłsudski, Lev Sternberg, and Taroji Chitoku are known.

=== Ainu poets ===
At the beginning of the 20th century, Ainu poets such as Yaeko Batchelor, Hokuto Iboshi, Moritake Takeichi, and others began to express the situation of the modern Ainu in the field of literature such as tanka poetry. Their works continue to influence Ainu thought to this day.

== Modern Ainu ==
=== Study of Ainu culture ===
The Ainu Shigeru Kayano and others, who later became representatives in the National Diet, promoted the study of Ainu culture and the collection of materials, leading to the construction of archives and museums in various locations.

=== Cultural revival movement ===
Since the late 1970s, the revival of Ainu traditional culture has gained momentum, and Iomantes have been held in Hiratori-cho, Shiraoi, and Asahikawa. In 1983, a ceremony to send the spirits of Blakiston's fish owls was held at Lake Kussharo. In Sapporo in 1982, the Ashiricep Nomi ceremony was held to welcome the salmon run in the Toyohira River, and other movements to revise the Ainu spiritual world were held in the early 1980s. As for traditional dance, there are 20 preservation societies in Hokkaido, and 17 of them were designated List of Important Intangible Folk Cultural Properties in 1984 under the name of "Ainu Traditional Dance".

In 1997, the "Act on the Promotion of Ainu Culture and the Dissemination and Enlightenment of Knowledge about Ainu Tradition" was passed. Kayano Shigeru, who became a member of the National Diet, worked to preserve the Ainu language by asking questions to the Diet in his native language, Ainu, and compiling an Ainu dictionary. "The Ainu traditional dance was registered as intangible cultural heritage by UNESCO in 2009. In addition, not only Japanese but also Koreans and other people are involved in the preservation of Ainu culture.

Activities to restore the traditional Ainu boat, the itaomacip, have begun, and in Nibutani, the Tiwassanke (boat-unloading ceremony) has been held. There is also a group in the Shiretoko area that is building Itaoma fish tapes as a tourist resource. The Ainu Association of Hokkaido, the organization that oversees the Utari, holds an annual Ainu cultural festival. Active representation of Ainu history has also begun, and a memorial service for Shakushain is held in Shinhidaka Town every year on September 23. Although she did not emphasize her Ainu identity, Sunazawa Bikki gained international recognition as a sculptor.

=== Cultural blending ===
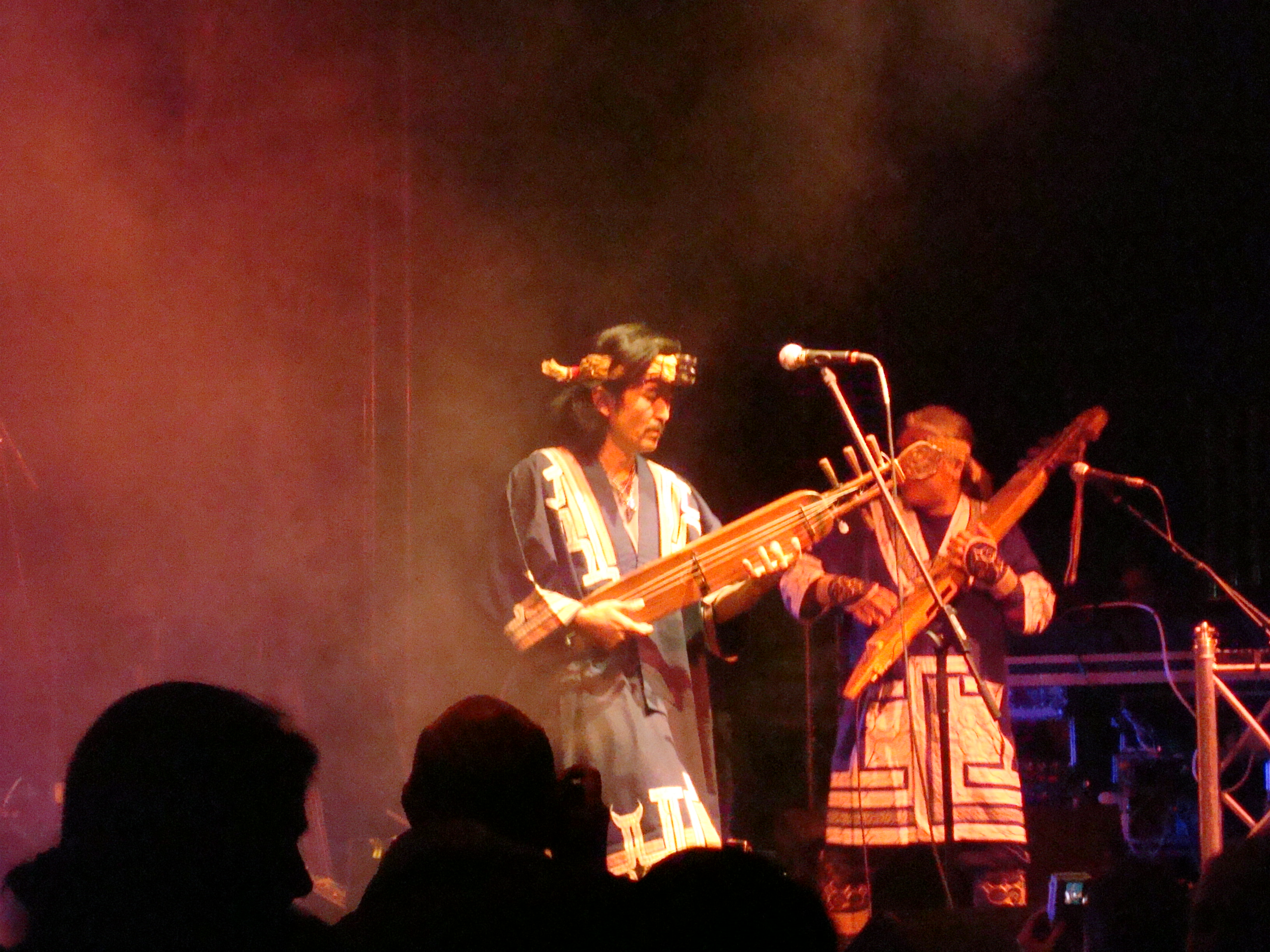
Ainu Dub Band led by OKI

In recent years, there has been a growing movement to incorporate cultural elements from outside the adjacent cultural sphere and to interact with indigenous peoples from other regions. The musician Oki, of Ainu and Japanese descent, has brought the tonkori, a traditional instrument of the Kabuto Ainu, into reggae. The Ainu Rebels, formed by the Sakai siblings, who are half-Ainu and half-Japanese, have released works that combine hip hop music with traditional Ainu dance and Ainu languages poetry.

Exchange activities with indigenous people in other regions have not been uncommon in recent years. The Sapporo-based group Ainu Art Project performed music and dance with the Tlingit tribe of North America in 2000, and participated in the annual International Canoe Festival in Maui, Hawaii. In 2007, Haruzo Urakawa and other Ainu from the Kantō region joined Native Hawaiians to hold a Kamuinomi for traditional canoeing in Yokohama.

=== Public support ===
- In 2010, Sapporo University started a program called the "Ureshipa Project" for Ainu. The main pillars of the project are a scholarship program for Ainu children, including tuition exemptions, and classes on Ainu culture and communication.
- The Ministry of Economy, Trade and Industry is implementing the "Ainu Small and Medium Enterprises Promotion Project" for small and medium-sized enterprises that are developing businesses that target Ainu culture. Cite webpage.
- Agency for Cultural Affairs has a subordinate organization, the Ainu Culture Promotion and Research Organization, which works to promote the Ainu language and to pass on and revive the Ainu culture.
- Ministry of Agriculture, Forestry and Fisheries (Japan) has been conducting the Ainu Agriculture, Forestry and Fisheries Measures Project since 1976 to improve the income and living standards of Ainu people engaged in agriculture, forestry and fisheries.

=== "Ainu privilege" ===
A rumor began to circulate between 2014 and 2015 that the Ainu people were enjoying preferential treatment for various vulnerable groups by taking advantage of their position as victims of rape by the Japanese. In response to this rumor, Comics artist Yoshinori Kobayashi argued that "Ainu are not indigenous to Hokkaido," citing "the fact that the Ainu people did not call themselves 'Ainu' during the period of colonization." In response to Kobayashi's opinion, the critic Keihira Furuya wrote, "If the logic that 'because an ethnic group does not call itself "Ainu", it does not exist' holds true, then it would be impossible to say that there are Native Americans in the United States (or Indians)."

== Ior Renewal Issues ==
In the Ainu culture, there was no concept of private ownership of land. Instead, there were settlements and fishing grounds where the kotan had the right of membership, and the biological resources needed by the kotan were procured from the settlements of the kotan. These areas are called ior, translated as "traditional living space". In addition to being a place to procure biological resources, the ior is unique in that it is closely related to Ainu's spiritual culture, including rituals. However, since the Meiji era (1868–1912), due to government policies that lacked an understanding of Ainu culture, the lifestyle and culture of the Ainu based on Ioru has been destroyed and has been lost to this day. There has been a growing concern about restoring the Ioru in recent years.

In 1996, a private advisory body to the Chief Cabinet Secretary identified the revitalization of ior as one of the policy issues to be considered and formulated a proposal to revive ior as a place for the Ainu to pass on their traditional culture in the form of a park. In 2000, the Ministry of Land, Infrastructure, Transport, and Tourism's Hokkaido Bureau, the Agency for Cultural Affairs, Hokkaido, the Organization for the Promotion of Ainu Culture and Research, and the Hokkaido Utari Association jointly established the "Council for the Promotion of Ainu Culture" to discuss measures to promote Ainu culture, including the revival of ior. In 2002, seven sites were selected as candidate sites for the revitalization of ior.

However, some point out the lack of usability of the reclaimed ior system selected in this way, and it cannot be said that ior reclamation is necessarily going smoothly.

=== Candidate sites for Ior revitalization ===
- Core Ioru – Shiraoi Town
- Regional Ior – Sapporo City, Asahikawa City, Hiratori Town, Shizunai, Tokachi, Kushiro

== In popular culture ==
- Harukoro – A manga about the growth of an Ainu girl named Harukoro. Written by Kei Ishizaka.
- Samurai Spirits – A fighting game. The main character Nakoruru is an Ainu.
- Golden Kamuy – A manga work by Satoru Noda, set in Hokkaido and Sakhalin in the late Meiji era. It has also been made into an anime.

== See also ==
- Ainu languages
- Personal name
- Emishi
- Japanese civilization
- Okhotsk culture
