= Sapporo Ainu Culture Promotion Center =

- 札幌市アイヌ文化交流センター
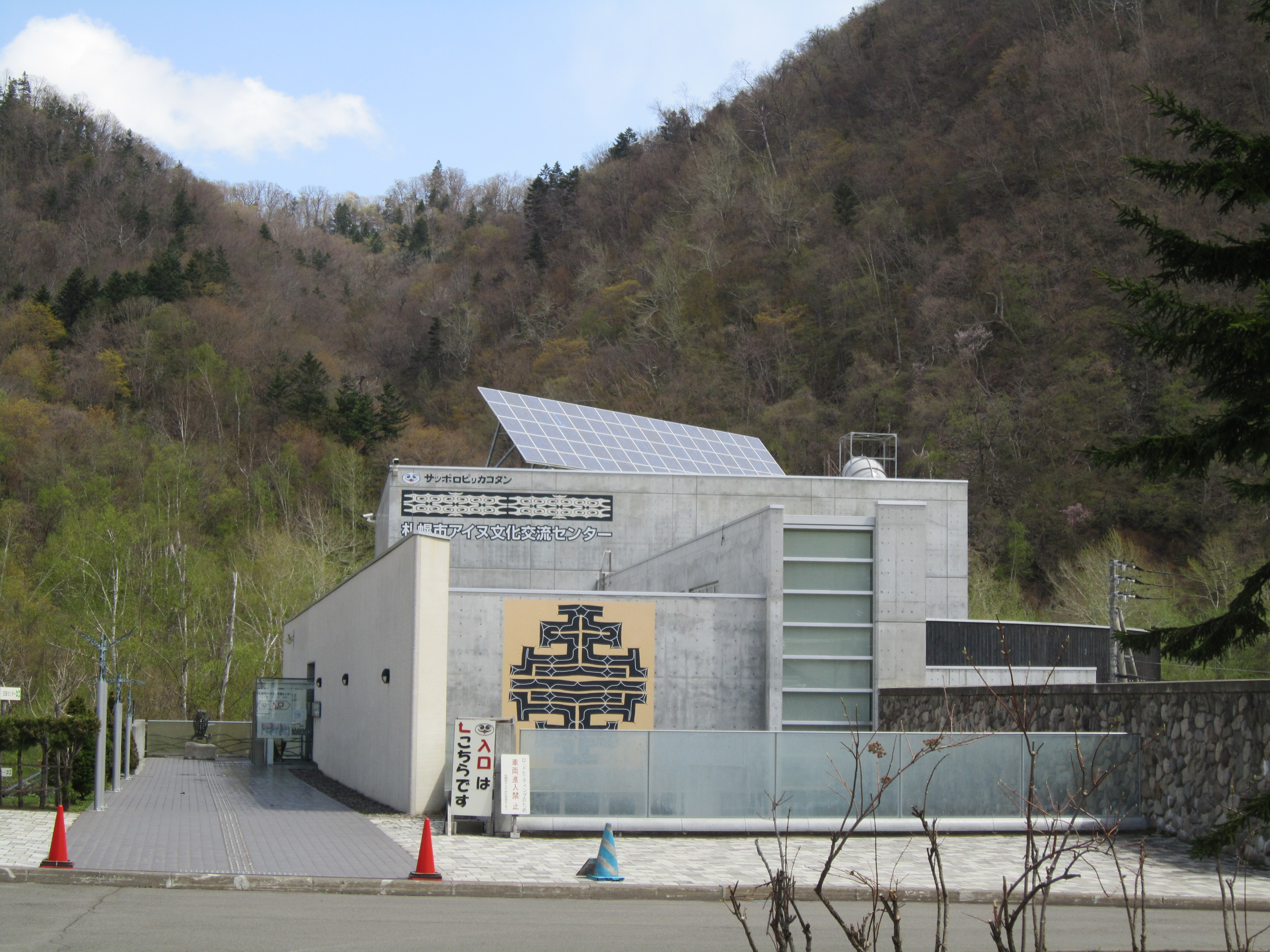
- Interactive map of the Sapporo Ainu Culture Promotion Center area

General information
- Location: 27 Koganeyu, Minami-ku, Sapporo, Hokkaido, Japan
- Coordinates: 42°58′08″N 141°13′11″E
- Opened: 20 December 2003

Website
- Official website (ja)

The Sapporo Ainu Culture Promotion Center (札幌市アイヌ文化交流センター, Sapporo-shi Ainu Bunka Kōryū Sentā), also known as Sapporo Pirka Kotan (サッポロピㇼカコタン) or "Beautiful Village", opened in Sapporo, Hokkaido, Japan, in 2003. Dedicated to the Ainu people, their history, culture, and way of life, the museum has some three hundred artefacts on display and there is also a traditional-style cise (dwelling).

== See also ==
- National Ainu Museum
- Hokkaido Museum
- Toyohira River
