= Matanpushi =

Traditional Ainu head garment

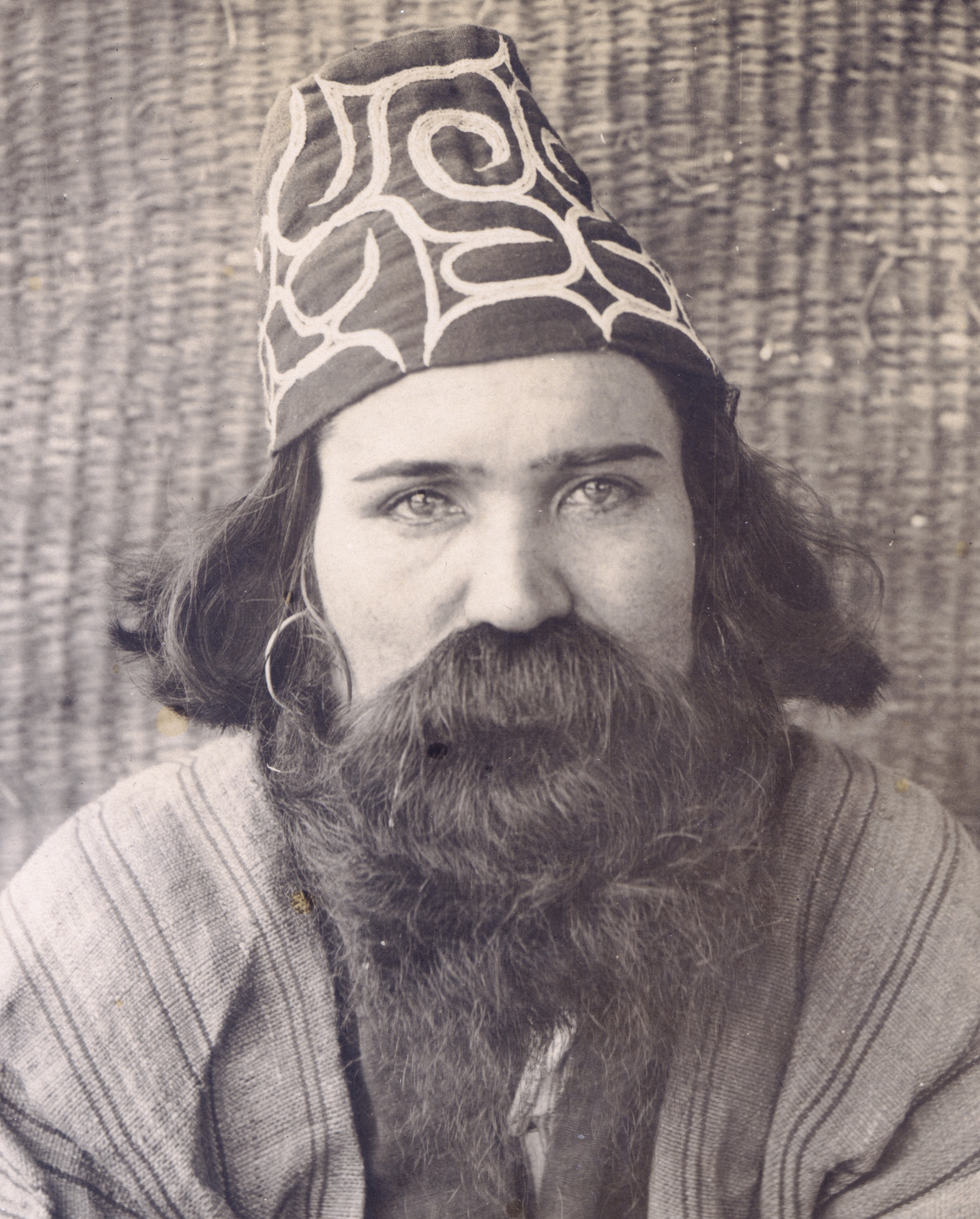
Ainu leader wearing a matanpushi in 1904

The matanpushi (Ainu/Japanese: マタンプシ) is a traditional head garment worn by the Ainu people of Japan. Complementing the sapanpe – which is worn by men – the matanpushi is usually worn by women in modern Ainu ceremonies, although originally it was a common facet of Ainu fashion among men.

== History ==
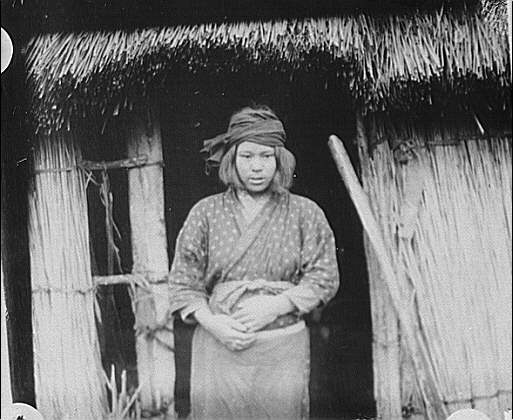
Senkaki worn by everyday women

The Ainu have no recorded habit of tying their hair. Accordingly, both men and women regularly trimmed it so that it would not grow past their shoulders. In order to protect their hair from harsh elements during daily tasks such as housework and hunting, both sexes wore headbands. Women wore a plain black cloth known as a senkaki (Ainu: センカキ) around their head and tied it with a plain headband known as a chepanup (チェパヌㇷ゚), and men wore a matanpushi headband. Gradually, towards the latter half of the Meiji era, women too began wearing the matanpushi, and the sapanpe replaced the matanpushi as the traditional headband for men.

== Construction and usage ==
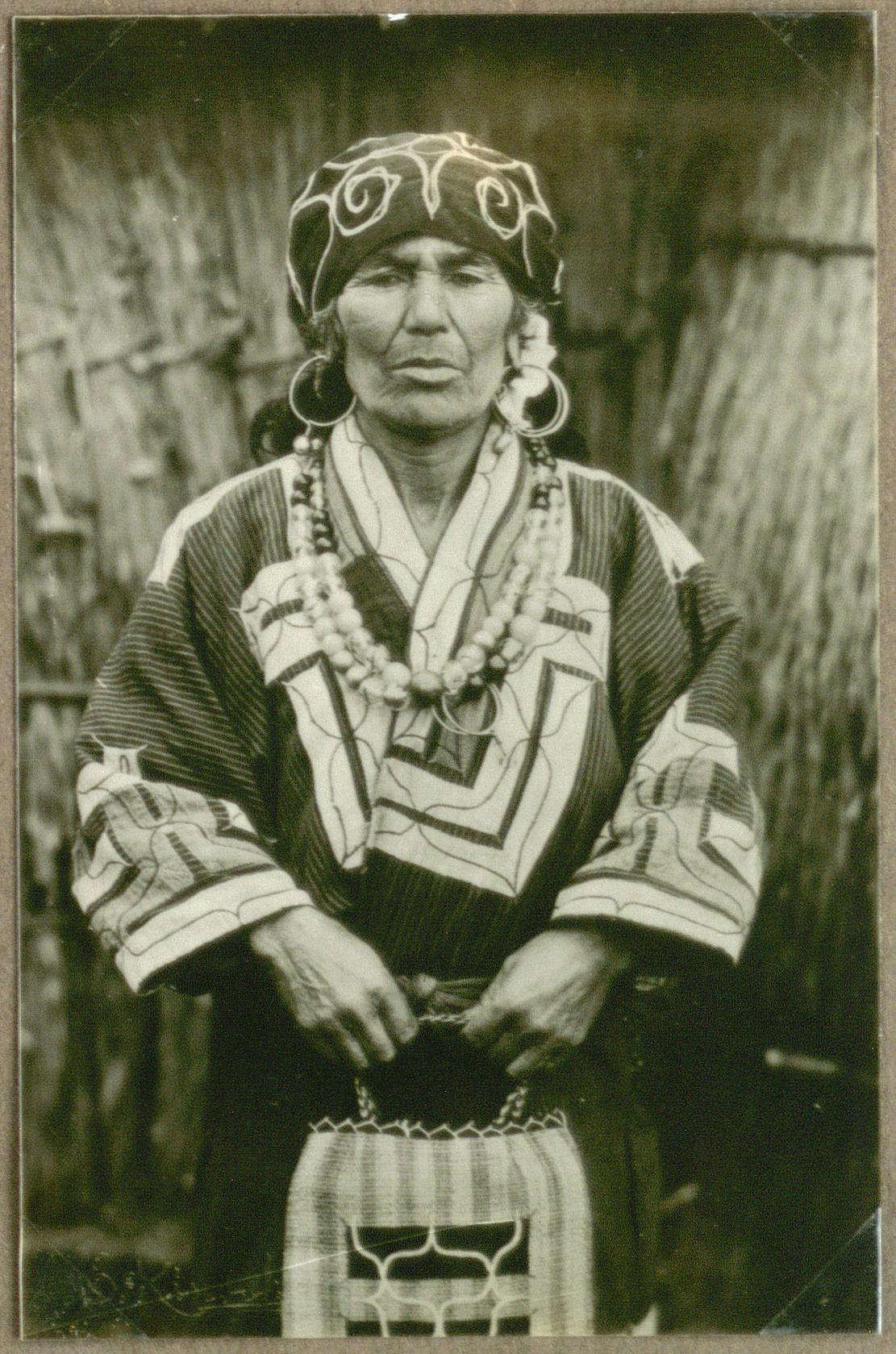
Ainu woman wearing a matanpushi

Fabricated from cotton, the matanpushi is generally no longer than one metre (3 ft 3 in). An elaborate geometric pattern known as the "Ainu pattern" is used to decorate its widely-cut forehead. When worn by men, it was traditionally tied at the back of the head, whereas women tied it at the front. Nowadays, it is tied behind the head regardless of gender.

== In popular culture ==
Japanese Ainu folk-hip-hop band Ainu Rebels are known for wearing the matanpushi during their performances. Asirpa, the main character of the manga Golden Kamuy, is seen wearing the headband throughout the story. In the 2020 Nintendo game Animal Crossing: New Horizons, the matanpushi is also a fashion item available for purchase by the player at the Able Sisters.
