= Kibori kuma =

Japanese rural craft

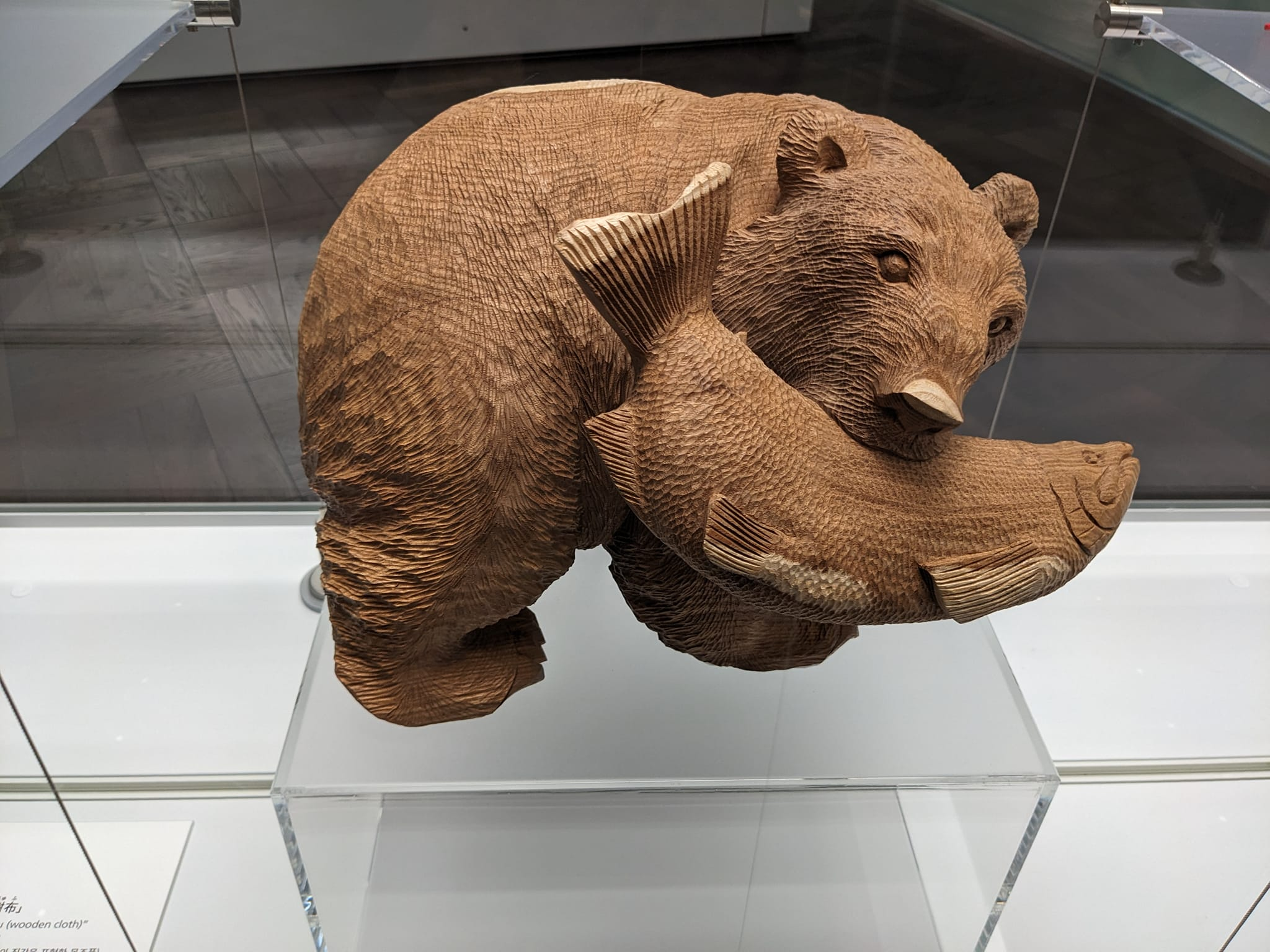
Ainu wooden carving of a bear with a fish in its mouth.

Kibori kuma (Japanese: 木彫り熊) is a Japanese rural craft that consists of a wooden carving of a bear with a fish in its mouth. The sculptures are mainly produced in Hokkaido; small carvings are sold as souvenirs of the island. The most common design depicts a brown bear biting a chum salmon, and the sculptor portrays the bear's thick bristles by using an axe. However, many variations of the kibori kuma have evolved.

== Origins ==
Between 1921-1922, Tokugawa Yoshichika, the 19th leader of the Owari branch, purchased a wooden carving of a bear while he was in Bern, Switzerland. After returning to Japan, Tokugawa traveled to the “Tokugawa Farm,” a farm in the town of Yakumo that was then part of the Owari Domain. Tokugawa presented the carving to the farmers, suggesting that they manufacture copies of it during the winter as a source of income. The farmers agreed, and the first sculptures they made were displayed at a 1924 exhibition of rural arts and crafts that was held in the town.

During a 1927 exhibition, a kibori kuma was awarded a prize and offered to Prince Chichibu. The following year, an exhibition of bear sculptures was held to commemorate the 50th anniversary of Yakumo. Through these exhibitions, the popularity of kibori kuma spread throughout the country; as many as 5,000 carvings were produced during the early Shōwa period.

The kibori kuma was also produced in the city of Asahikawa. Matsui Umetarou, an Ainu, helped manufacture the souvenir and increase its popularity. When Emperor Hirohito visited Hokkaido in 1936, he was offered two bear carvings—one from Yakumo and one from Asahikawa. However, manufacture of the souvenir has since declined. As of 2012, only one site of production remains. A museum in Yakumo town opened in April 2012 to display these crafts to the community once again.
