= Sapanpe =

Traditional Ainu ritual crown

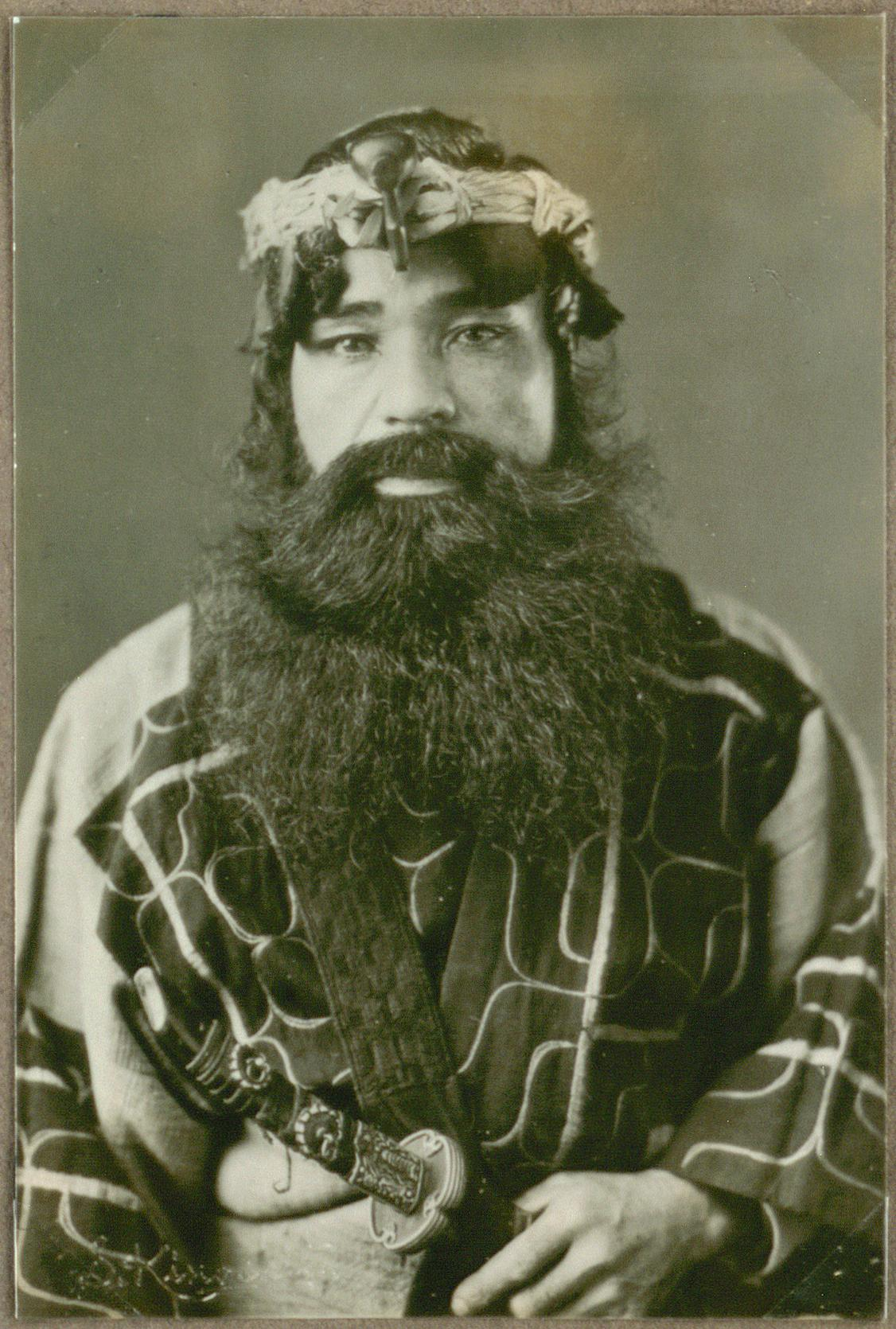
Man wearing a sapanpe

The sapanpe (Ainu/Japanese: サパンペ) is a ritual crown worn by adult men during traditional Ainu ceremonies. It is complemented by the matanpushi, which is now worn mostly by women. It is traditionally believed to impart great power to the one who wears it.

== History ==
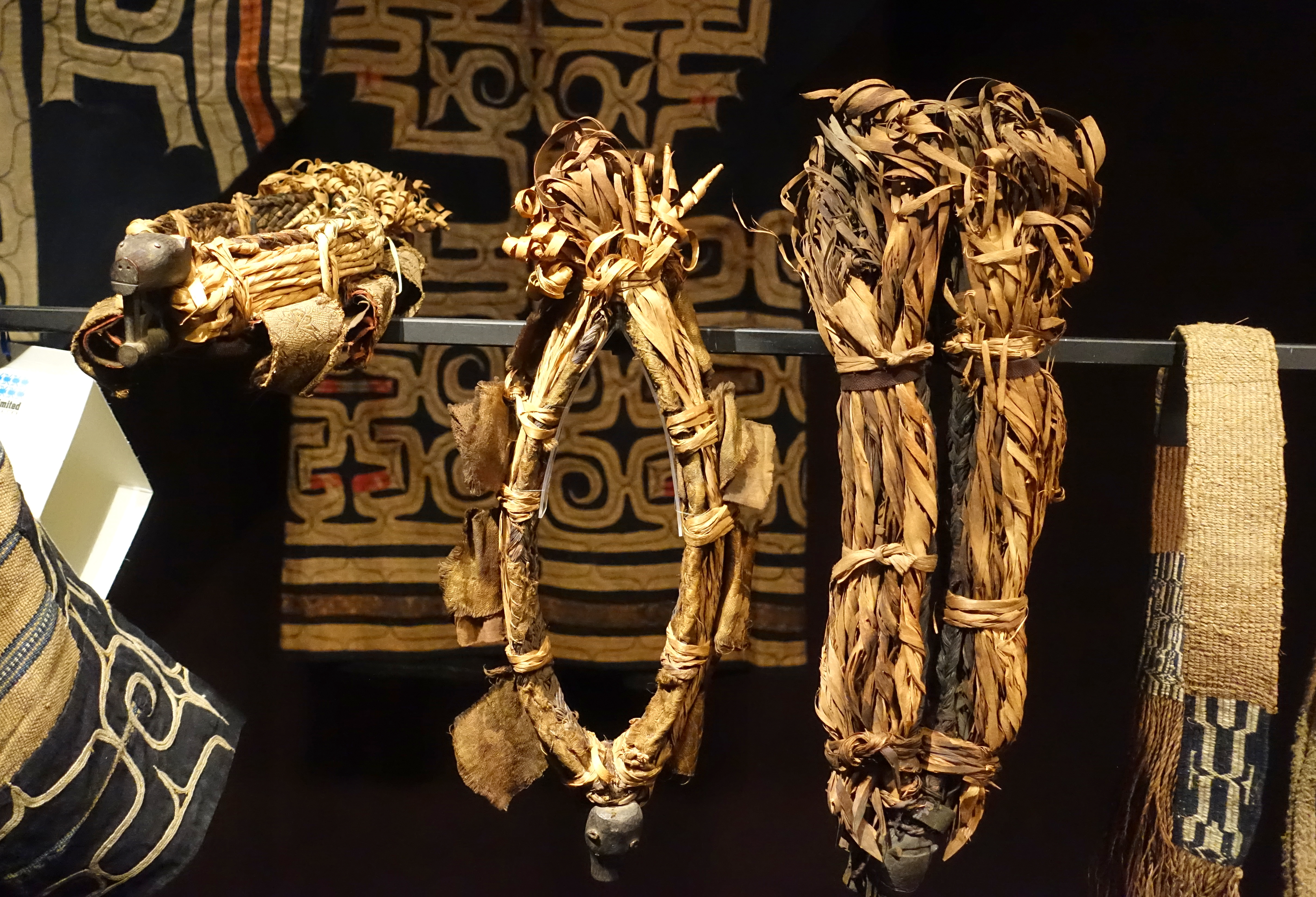
A sapanpe exhibited in a museum in Stockholm

Sapanpe means 'that which is on the head' and is a combination of the Ainu root words sapa-un-pe (Ainu: サパ・ウン・ペ). The sapanpe is not intended to be worn on a daily basis; it is usually worn during iomante ceremonies and other festivals, or to celebrate important guests. In the Southwestern Hokkaido subprefectures of Oshima, Iburi, and Hidaka, the sapanpe is worn by most adult men that participate in rituals, but in Tokachi, it is only permitted to be worn by male elders in important festivals. It is considered deeply shameful to cause trouble while wearing the sapanpe. The sapanpe is also not worn during rituals involving the dead such as funerals and ancestral festivals.

== Construction ==
The shape of the sapanpe resembles a headband, covering the outer circumference of the head, rather than the entire head. The bark of a vitis coignetiae is twisted up to make a rough shape, and a wooden carving that imitates the head of an animal, such as a brown bear or a red fox, is attached to the forehead. The peripheral ends of the sapanpe are then covered with inau shavings – cornus controversa and willow shavings. It can be further decorated with Japanese linden bark, coiled bulrush stalks, fabric from mainland Japan, or shark teeth.
