= Kotan (village) =

Type of traditional Ainu Settlement

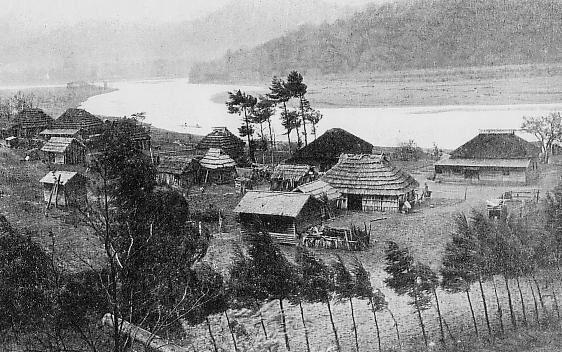
Biratori kotan circa 1930.

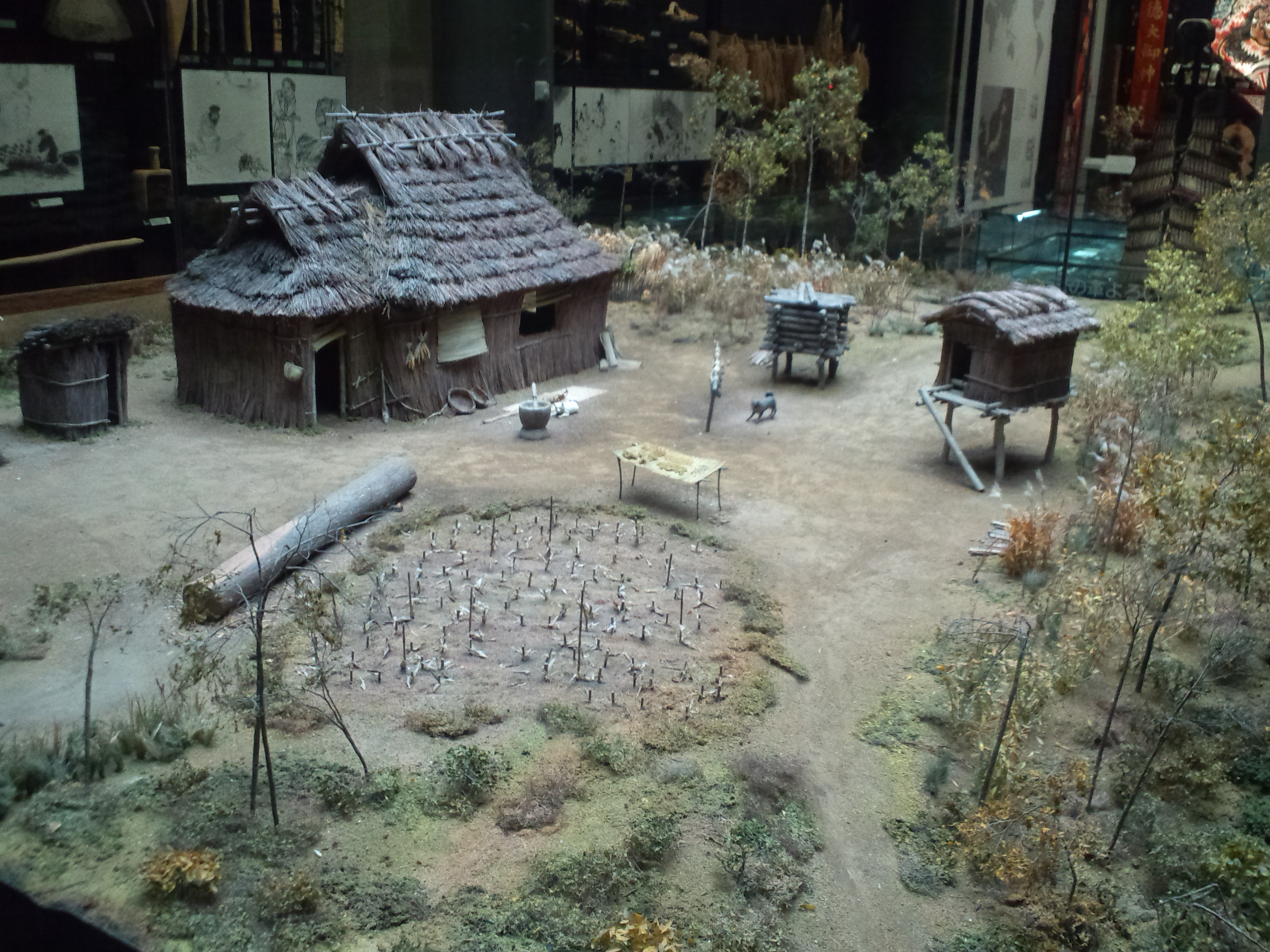
A model of an Ainu house in the National Museum of Ethnology, Osaka. A toilet, hepereset (bear cage), and pui (stilt warehouse) can be seen.

A kotan (Katakana: コタン) is a traditional settlement of the Ainu people.

== Introduction ==
Due to the scarcity of primary source materials (as the Ainu did not have a system of writing), all studies on the Ainu kotan (based on Russian, Japanese, and English works) will have different analyzations and opinions, varying largely depending on the researchers and the duration of their work.

The word kotan is often erroneously translated to as a "village"; the term generally applies to all human settlements, regardless of their size. For example, in the Ainu translation of the Bible, Rome and Jerusalem are referred to as yerusalem kotan and roma kotan, respectively.

== Description ==
Unlike other hunter-gatherers, who did not settle in one place at any given time, the Ainu were highly dependent on fishing. Therefore, they settled in places that had good fishing, like estuaries, and built settlements there, although depending on the season, the Ainu would move to a new fishing spot. For example, if the salmon spawning grounds differed along the same stretch of river, the Ainu would migrate along with the ground, leading to kotans being built at intervals of about 5 to 7 kilometers.

Average kotans were rather small and sparsely populated. A kotan can be made up of around five to seven houses, though there were larger settlements of ten or more. More than 20 households generally was the result of the forced Ainu labor mobilization under the place-contract system (場所請負制) established by the Matsumae clan during the Edo period, which cannot be called a traditional-style kotan anymore. In 1856, Takeshirō Matsuura, an explorer in Hokkaido, reported the statistical kotan was inhabited by 10 families and 47 people in total.

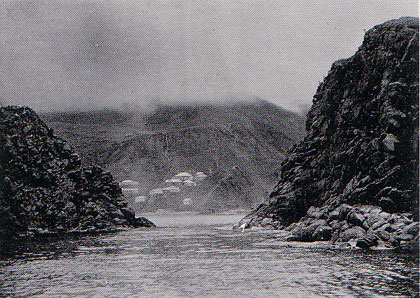
Kitakotan, a Sakhalin Ainu village off of the coast of Okinoshima.

A kotan generally consisted of cise (thatched-roof houses), hepereset (cages for keeping young bears usually for the iomante ceremony), an ashinru and/or menokol (lavatories for the males and females respectively), a pui (stilt warehouse for storing food), and various drying racks for wild plants, fish, and animal skins. There is usually an nusasan (altar) dedicated to inaw for the kamuy (gods) as well. In later years, chashis (fortifications) can be found around Ainu settlements.

There was a common ground near the kotans called the iwolo, where kotan residents were free to cut down trees, hunt, fish, and forage for wild plants and cultivate them. Adjacent kotans were invited to share the hunting grounds, conduct the iomante ceremony together, and most often had one chief for several kotans. Such a collection of friendly kotan are called ekasi itokpa.

== Current Ainu kotan ==
There is only one Ainu kotan still continually inhabited to the present day, the Lake Akan kotan in Kushiro. In 1959, there were still a scattering of Ainu kotans around Lake Akan, before Mitsuko Maeda of the Maeda Ippoen Foundation (an organization that helped in conserving Lake Akan) suggested the remaining Ainu to relocate to the new land purchased by him. As the Ainu relocated to the new land free of charge, the Lake Akan kotan was created.

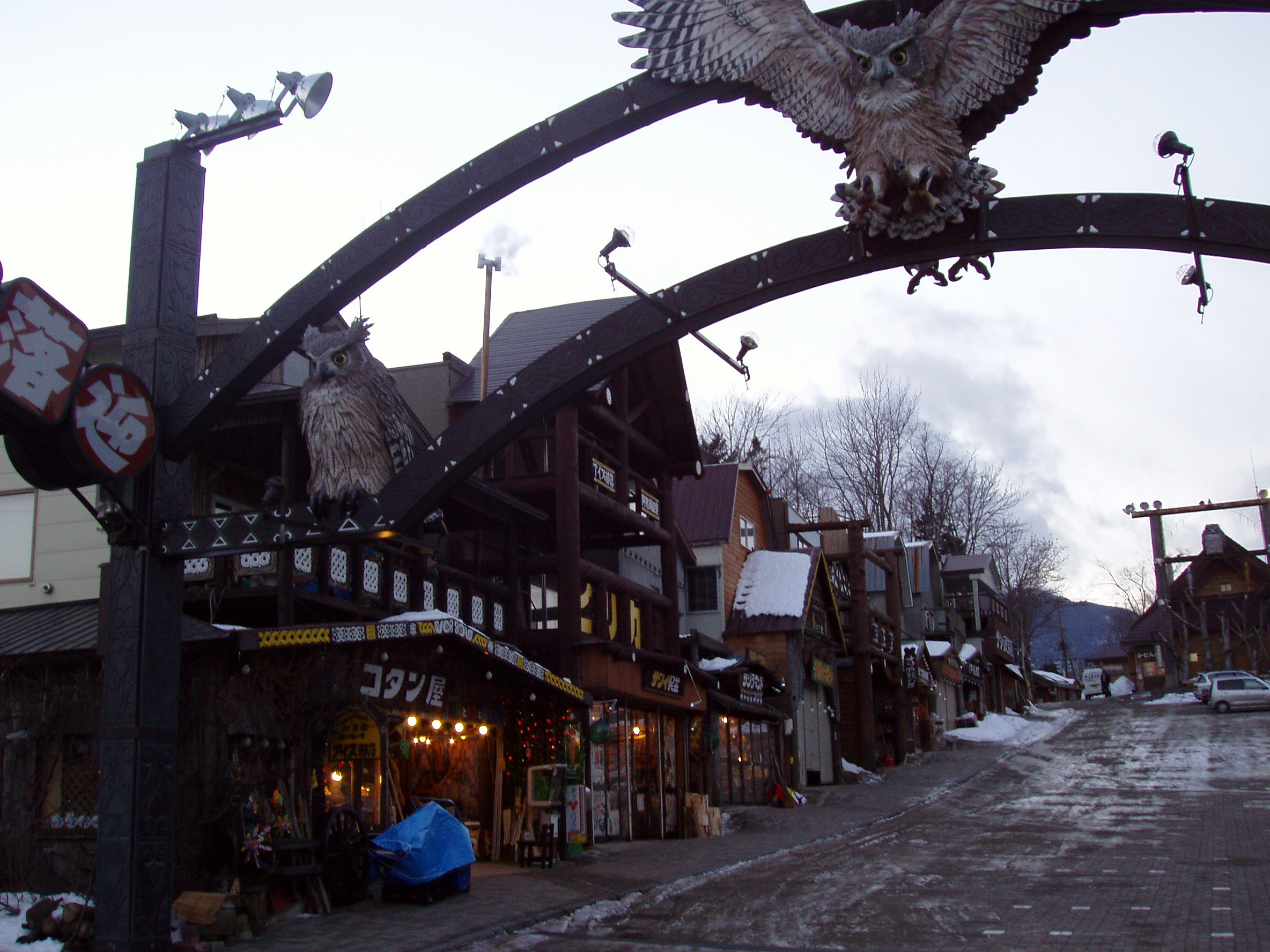
Lake Akan Kotan (photographed December 11, 2004)

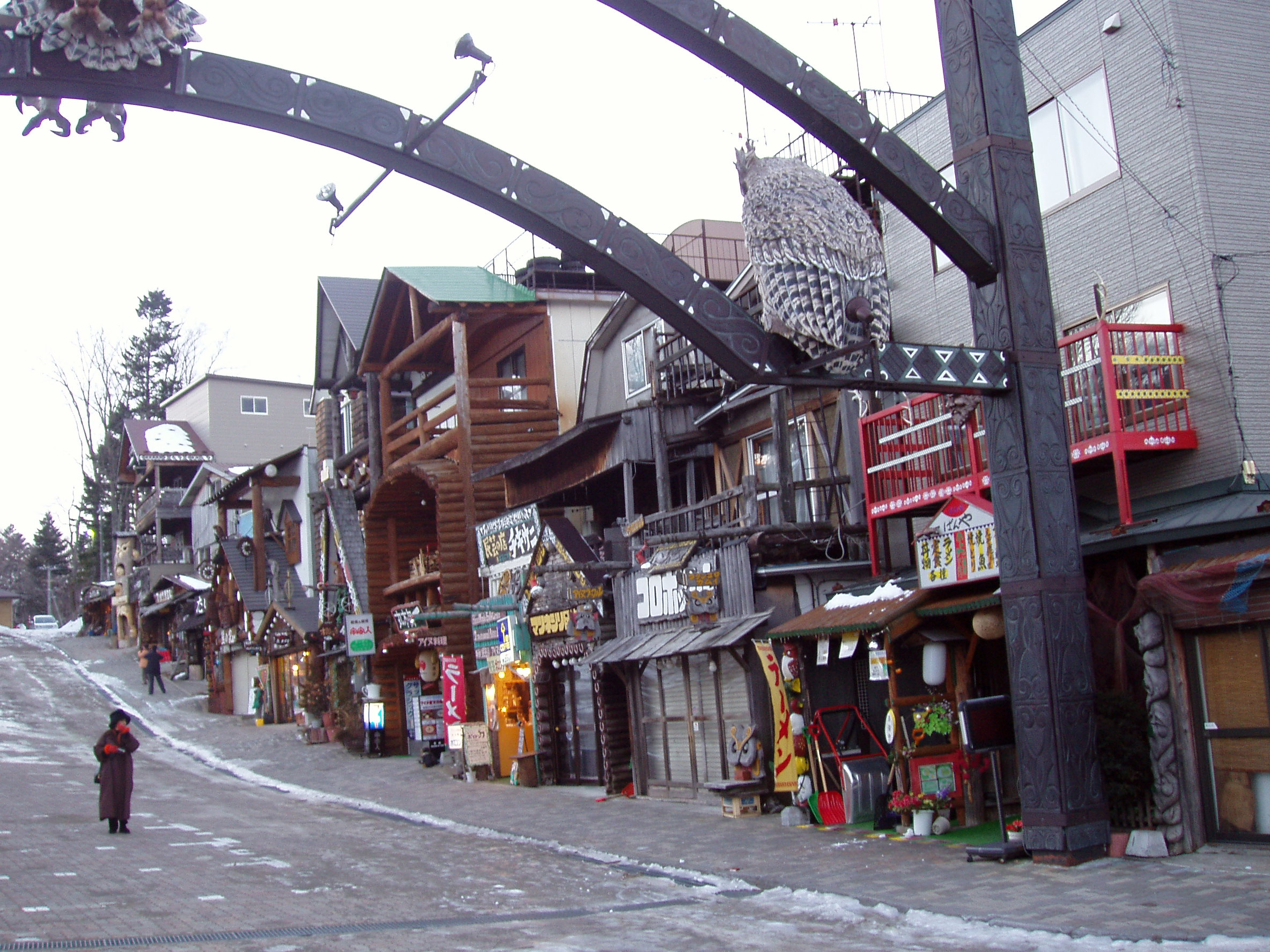
Lake Akan Kotan (photographed December 11, 2004)

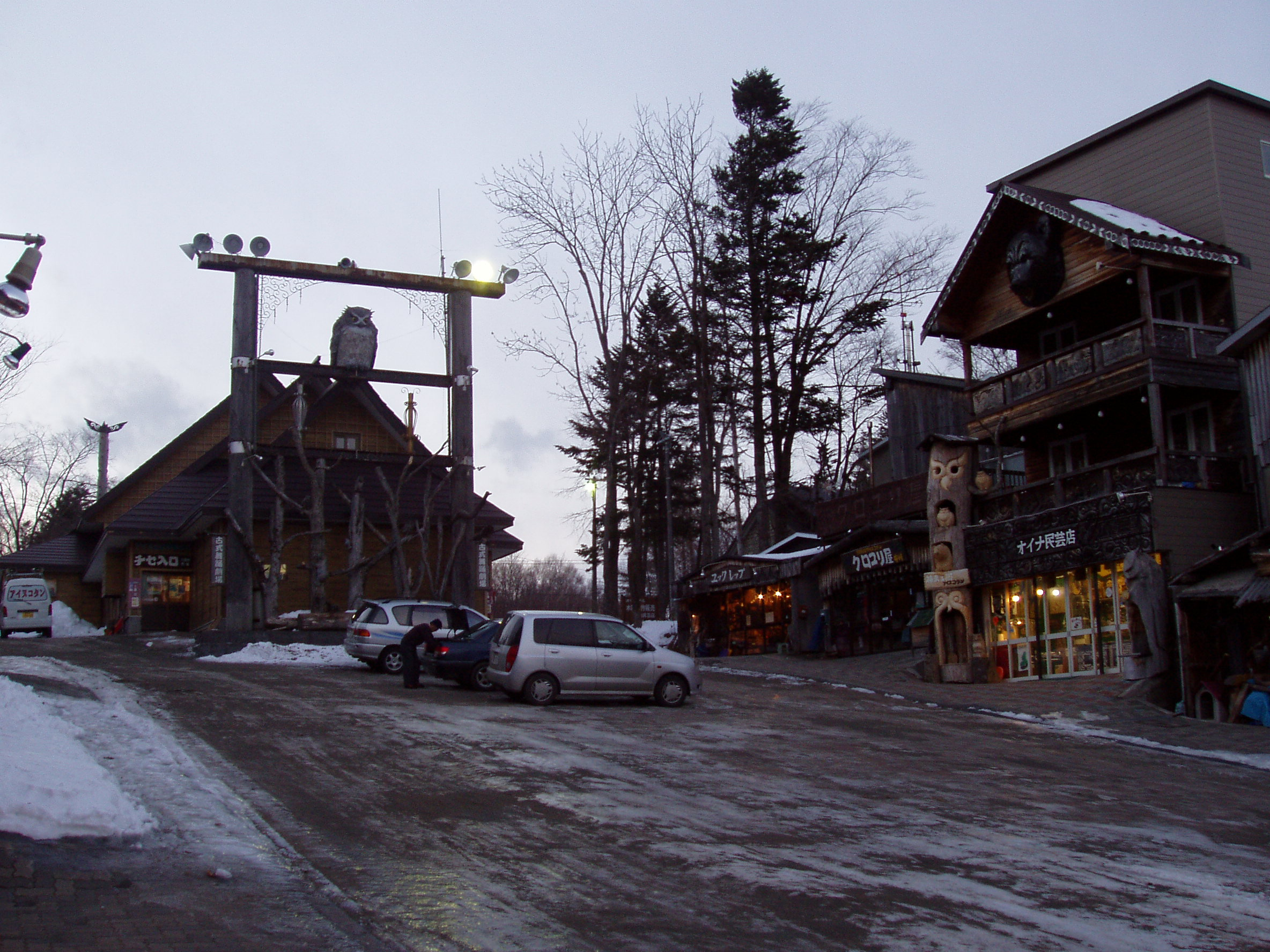
Lake Akan Kotan (photographed December 11, 2004)

== Use of kotan as a place name ==
Each kotan had a unique place name, and as such, the suffix kotan can be found throughout Hokkaido, Sakhalin, and the Kuril islands.

=== Hokkaido ===
- Shakotan (積丹, "summer village")
- Kotanbetsu (古丹別, "village river")
- Kamuikotan (神居古丹, "village of the gods")
- Tokotan (床丹, "destroyed village")
- Shikotan (色丹, "real village")
- Ayumikotan (歩古丹, "abalone village")
- Okotanpe (オコタンペ, "river with a village downstream")
- Kotani (小谷, "village river")
- Shimakotan (島古丹, "village with many stones")

=== Sakhalin ===
- Kushunkotan (久春古丹)

=== Kuril Islands ===
- Onnekotan (温禰古丹, "large village")
- Shashikotan (捨子古丹, "kombu village")
- Chirinkotan (知林古丹, "mudslide village")
- Kharimkotan (春牟古丹, "village of many cardiocrinum")
