= Itaomacip =

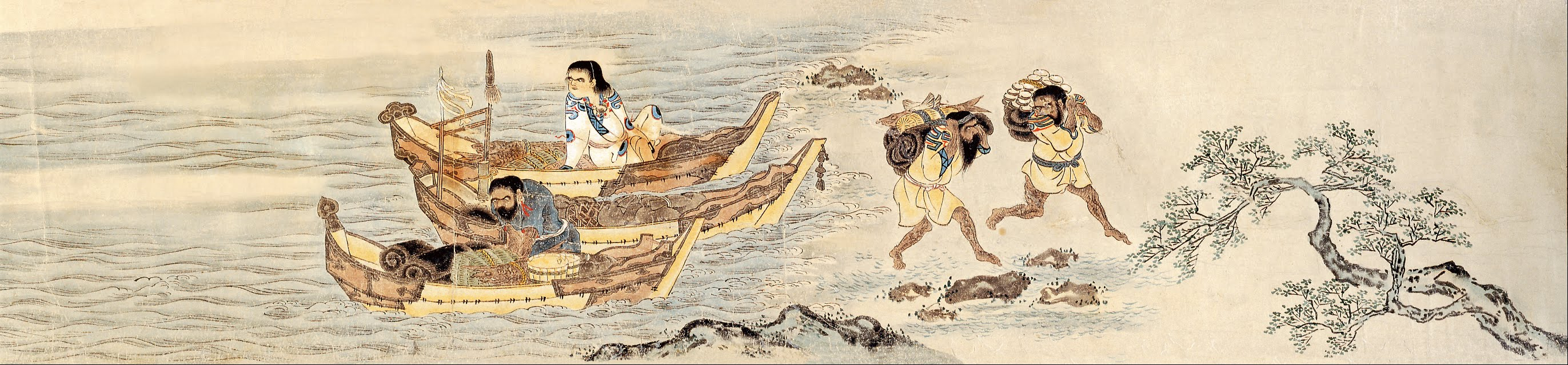
Itaomacip drawn by Kodama Teiryo, bearing cargo of fur and dried salmon for trade. The ship drawn is not to scale: the actual hull is much larger than a human.

An itaomacip (Japanese: イタオマチㇷ゚, Ainu: ita-oma-cip, "boat with a board") is a boat built traditionally by the Ainu for seafaring purposes. The name itaomacip is derived from the Ainu words ita-oma-cip, meaning literally a "boat with a board" (ita is a loan word from Japanese meaning "board"). It is a sewn boat enlarged via attaching side plates to a dugout canoe. When navigating inland waters, like rivers or lakes, Ainu typically utilized a cip, or plain dugout canoe, but used itaomacips whenever navigating the outer seas for trading purposes. Its construction techniques are unknown from other regions of Japan other than Hokkaido.
