= Matsuura Takeshirō Memorial Museum =

Museum in Matsusaka, Mie Prefecture, Japan

- 松浦武四郎記念館
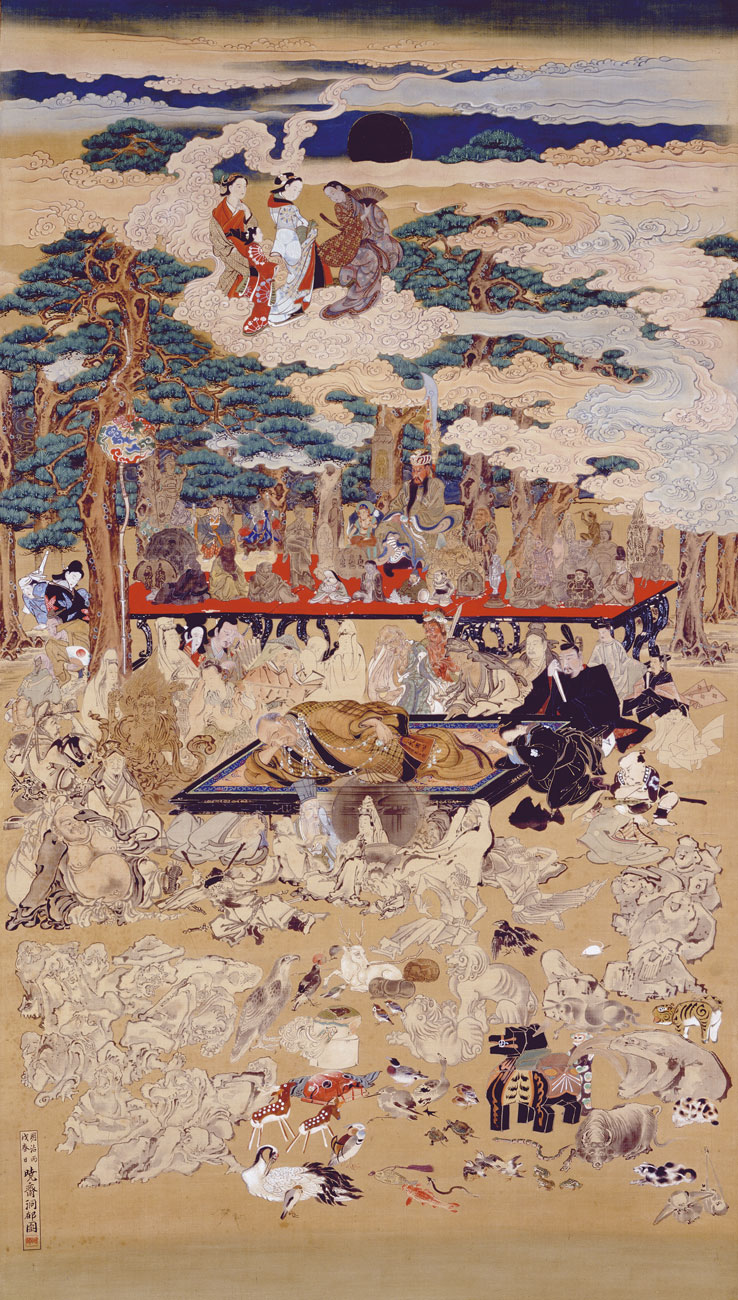
- Hokkai Dōjin Taking a Nap Under the Trees (ICP) (1886), by Kawanabe Kyōsai (Matsuura Takeshirō Memorial Museum)
- Interactive map of the Matsuura Takeshirō Memorial Museum area

General information
- Location: 383 Onoe-chō, Matsusaka, Mie Prefecture, Japan
- Coordinates: 34°38′33″N 136°30′33″E
- Opened: 1994

Website
- Official website

Matsuura Takeshirō Memorial Museum (松浦武四郎記念館, Matsuura Takeshirō Kinenkan) opened in Matsusaka, Mie Prefecture, Japan in 1994. It is dedicated to the life and work of local scion and explorer Matsuura Takeshirō, who travelled to Ezo six times at the end of the Edo period, penning many volumes of diaries and producing many maps. The collection includes the Important Cultural Property Materials Relating to Matsuura Takeshirō, an assemblage of some 1,503 items.

== See also ==
- List of Cultural Properties of Japan - historical materials (Mie)
- Ainu people
- Motoori Norinaga
