= List of cultural properties of Japan – historical materials (Mie) =

This list is of the cultural properties of Japan designated in the category of historical materials (歴史資料, rekishi shiryō) for the Prefecture of Mie.

== National Cultural Properties ==
As of 1 July 2020, four Important Cultural Properties have been designated, being of national significance.

Property	Date	Municipality	Ownership	Comments	Image	Coordinates	Ref.
Trade-related materials of the Kadoya Family 角屋家貿易関係資料; Kadoya-ke bōeki kankei shiryō	Edo period	Ise	Jingū Chōkokan-Nōgyōkan (神宮徴古館・農業館)	11 items, comprising a map of East Asia, two flags, and seven scrolls and one volume of documents		34°29′12″N 136°43′24″E	
Shūko Jisshu woodblocks 集古十種板木; Shūko Jisshu hangi	Edo period	Kuwana	Chinkokushukoku Jinja (鎮国守国神社)	1,451 items		35°03′55″N 136°41′56″E	
Astronomy-related materials of Shibukawa Shunkai 渋川春海天文関係資料; Shibukawa Shunkai tenmon kankei shiryō	Edo period	Ise	Jingū Chōkokan-Nōgyōkan (神宮徴古館・農業館)	12 items		34°29′12″N 136°43′24″E	
Materials relating to Matsuura Takeshirō 松浦武四郎関係資料; Matsuura Takeshirō kankei shiryō	Edo to Meiji period	Matsusaka	Matsuura Takeshirō Memorial Museum	1,503 items		34°38′33″N 136°30′33″E	

== Prefectural Cultural Properties ==
As of 1 February 2017, ten properties have been designated at a prefectural level.

Property	Date	Municipality	Ownership	Comments	Image	Coordinates	Ref.
Administrative documents of Mie Prefecture 三重県行政文書; Mie-ken gyōsei bunsho	Bakumatsu to 1957	Tsu	Mie Prefectural Museum	11,643 items, including 4,342 diagrams and maps		34°44′32″N 136°30′06″E	
Okadera Edition woodblocks and related materials 岡寺版集帖板木 並びに 関係資料; Okadera-ban shūjō hangi narabini kankei shiryō	1779–1809	Matsusaka	Keishō-ji (継松寺)	206 items		34°34′41″N 136°31′57″E	
Materials relating to Matsuura Takeshirō 松浦武四郎関係資料; Matsuura Takeshirō kankei shiryō	Edo to Meiji period	Matsusaka	Matsuura Takeshirō Memorial Museum	223 items		34°38′33″N 136°30′33″E	
Izawa Bunko and materials relating to Takegawa Chikusai 射和文庫並びに竹川竹斎関係資料; Izawa bunko narabini Takegawa Chikusai kankei shiryō	late Edo to early Meiji period	Matsusaka	private	4,323 items		34°30′31″N 136°32′32″E	
Hōei and Ansei Tsunami Memorial Stele (Saimyōji Memorial Stele) 宝永・安政津波供養碑（最明寺の供養碑） Hōei Ansei tsunami kuyō-hi (Saimyōji no kuyō-hi)	1856	Minamiise	Saimyō-ji (最明寺)	commemorates the earthquake and tsunami on the fourth day of the tenth month of Hōei 4 (1707) and that on the fourth day of the eleventh month of Kaei 7 (1854), that year also being the first of Ansei		34°17′04″N 136°33′22″E	
Hōei Tsunami Memorial Stele (Saimyōji Mahayana Sutra Stele) 宝永津波供養碑（最明寺の大乗經碑） Hōei Ansei tsunami kuyō-hi (Saimyōji no Daijōkyō-hi)	Edo period	Minamiise	Saimyō-ji (最明寺)	commemorates the earthquake and tsunami on the fourth day of the tenth month of Hōei 4 (1707)		34°17′04″N 136°33′22″E	
Hōei Tsunami Memorial Stele (Kanro-tera Three Worlds Myriad Souls Stele) 宝永津波供養碑（甘露寺の三界萬霊碑） Hōei Ansei tsunami kuyō-hi (Kanro-tera no sangai banrei-hi)	Edo period	Minamiise	Kanro-tera (甘露寺)	commemorates the earthquake and tsunami on the fourth day of the tenth month of Hōei 4 (1707)		34°15′29″N 136°27′44″E	
Documents relating to the Tōdō Domain Iga Sakuji-gata 藤堂藩伊賀作事方関連文書; Tōdō-han Iga sakuji-gata kanren bunsho	late Edo period	Iga	private	90 items		34°46′03″N 136°08′03″E	
Map of Iga Ueno Castle Town 伊賀上野城下絵図; Iga Ueno jōka e-zu	early Edo period	Iga	private	287.3 centimetres (113.1 in) by 320.0 centimetres (126.0 in)		34°45′56″N 136°07′24″E	
Hōei Tsunami Memorial Stele (Magoshi Cemetery Three Worlds Myriad Souls Stele) 宝永津波供養碑（馬越墓地の三界萬霊碑） Hōei tsunami kuyō-hi (Magoshi bochi no sangai banrei-hi)	1713	Owase	Kongō-ji (金剛寺)	commemorates the earthquake and tsunami on the fourth day of the tenth month of Hōei 4 (1707)		34°04′38″N 136°11′48″E	

== See also ==
- Cultural Properties of Japan
- List of National Treasures of Japan (historical materials)
- List of Cultural Properties of Japan - paintings (Mie)
- List of Historic Sites of Japan (Mie)
- Ise, Shima, Iga, Kii Provinces
