= List of cultural properties of Japan – paintings (Mie) =

This list is of the cultural properties of Japan designated in the category of paintings (絵画, kaiga) for the Prefecture of Mie.

== National Cultural Properties ==
As of 1 March 2015, eighteen Important Cultural Properties have been designated, being of national significance.

Property	Date	Municipality	Ownership	Comments	Image	Dimensions	Coordinates	Ref.
Former Nagashima Family Fusuma Paintings, by Soga Shōhaku 旧永島家襖絵〈曽我蕭白筆／〉 kyū-Nagashima-ke fusuma-e (Soga Shōhaku hitsu)	C18	Tsu	Mie Prefectural Art Museum	44 panels, of which 15 were removed and remounted before the war; depicted are landscapes, cattle at pasture, a hawk and a pine, a bird and a beast, a wolf and mujina, waves and waterfowl, and the Seven Sages of the Bamboo Grove		172 centimetres (5 ft 8 in) by 86 centimetres (2 ft 10 in)	34°44′06″N 136°30′07″E	
Amida Triad, colour on silk 絹本著色阿弥陀三尊像 kenpon chakushoku Amida sanson zō	late Goryeo	Tsu	Senju-ji	Goryeo Buddhist painting		168.5 centimetres (5 ft 6.3 in) by 92.4 centimetres (3 ft 0.4 in)	34°45′43″N 136°30′13″E	
Amida Triad, colour on silk 絹本著色阿弥陀三尊像 kenpon chakushoku Amida sanson zō	Kamakura period	Tsu	Senju-ji			88.3 centimetres (2 ft 10.8 in) by 43.3 centimetres (1 ft 5.0 in)	34°45′43″N 136°30′13″E	
Amida Raigō, colour on silk 絹本著色阿弥陀来迎図 kenpon chakushoku Amida raigō zō	Kamakura period	Tsu	Seirai-ji (西来寺)			65.0 centimetres (2 ft 1.6 in) by 30.6 centimetres (1 ft 0 in)	34°43′04″N 136°30′57″E	
Kōshō Bosatsu, colour on silk 絹本著色興正菩薩像 kenpon chakushoku Kōshō bosatsu zō	Kamakura period	Iga	Shindaibutsu-ji (新大仏寺) (kept at Nara National Museum)			119.1 centimetres (3 ft 10.9 in) by 63.6 centimetres (2 ft 1.0 in)	34°41′01″N 135°50′12″E	
Shaka's Eight-Phase Nirvana, colour on silk 絹本著色釈迦八相成道図 kenpon chakushoku Shaka hassō jōdō zu	Kamakura period	Kuwana	Daifukuden-ji (大福田寺) (kept at Nara National Museum)			119.4 centimetres (3 ft 11.0 in) by 84.8 centimetres (2 ft 9.4 in)	34°41′01″N 135°50′12″E	
Shōtoku Taishi's Lecture on the Śrīmālādevī Siṃhanāda Sūtra, colour on silk 絹本著色聖徳太子勝鬘経講讃図 kenpon chakushoku Shōtoku Taishi Shōman-kyō kōsan zu	Kamakura period	Tsu	Seirai-ji (西来寺) (kept at Kyoto National Museum)			95 centimetres (3 ft 1 in) by 65 centimetres (2 ft 2 in)	34°59′24″N 135°46′23″E	
Shōtoku Taishi, colour on silk 絹本著色聖徳太子像 kenpon chakushoku Shōtoku Taishi zō	Kamakura period	Tsu	Shitennō-ji (四天王寺) (kept at Osaka City Museum of Fine Arts (大阪市立美術館))			113 centimetres (3 ft 8 in) by 41 centimetres (1 ft 4 in)	34°39′01″N 135°30′38″E	
Jizō Bosatsu, colour on silk 絹本著色地蔵菩薩像 kenpon chakushoku Jizō Bosatsu zō	Kamakura period	Tsu	Jizō-in (地蔵院) (kept at Nara National Museum)			85.5 centimetres (2 ft 9.7 in) by 30 centimetres (1 ft 0 in)	34°41′01″N 135°50′12″E	
Tōdō Takatora, colour on silk 絹本著色藤堂高虎像 kenpon chakushoku Tōdō Takatora zō	Edo period	Tsu	Shitennō-ji (四天王寺) (kept at Kyoto National Museum)			96 centimetres (3 ft 2 in) by 109 centimetres (3 ft 7 in)	34°59′24″N 135°46′23″E	
Tōdō Takatora, colour on silk 絹本著色藤堂高虎像 kenpon chakushoku Tōdō Takatora zō	Edo period	Iga	Sairen-ji (西蓮寺)			103 centimetres (3 ft 5 in) by 60.6 centimetres (1 ft 11.9 in)	34°45′35″N 136°06′22″E	
Nirvana painting, colour on silk 絹本著色仏涅槃図 kenpon chakushoku Butsu nehan zu	1362	Tsu	Jōren-ji (成願寺)			103 centimetres (3 ft 5 in) by 60.6 centimetres (1 ft 11.9 in)	34°45′35″N 136°06′22″E	
Pictorial Biography of Hōnen Shōnin, colour on silk 絹本著色法然上人絵伝 kenpon chakushoku Hōnen shōnin e-den	Kamakura period	Taki	Saidō-ji (西導寺)	two scrolls		163.6 centimetres (5 ft 4.4 in) by 124.2 centimetres (4 ft 0.9 in)	34°28′49″N 136°29′23″E	
Immortals of Poetry, light colour on paper 紙本淡彩歌仙像 shihon tansai kasen zō	Kamakura period	Tsu	Senju-ji	3 scrolls		14.5 centimetres (5.7 in) by 20.0 centimetres (7.9 in)	34°45′43″N 136°30′13″E	
Ise New Meisho Poem Painting Contest, colour on paper 紙本著色伊勢新名所歌絵合 shihon chakushoku Ise shin-meisho uta-e awase	1295	Ise	Jingū Chōkokan-Nōgyōkan (神宮徴古館・農業館)	1 emakimono		34°29′12″N 136°43′24″E		
Kuki Yoshitaka, colour on paper 紙本著色九鬼嘉隆像 shihon chakushoku Kuki Yoshitaka zō	Momoyama period	Ise	Kongōshō-ji			89.3 centimetres (2 ft 11.2 in) by 48.5 centimetres (1 ft 7.1 in)	34°29′12″N 136°43′24″E	
Life of Zenshin Shōnin in Pictures and Words, colour on paper, by Kotobagaki Kakunyo 紙本著色善信上人絵詞伝〈詞書覚如筆／〉 shihon chakushoku Zenshin shōnin e-kotoba-den (Kotobagaki Kakunyo hitsu)	Kamakura period	Tsu	Senju-ji	5 emakimono		703.0 centimetres (23 ft 0.8 in) to 793.9 centimetres (26 ft 0.6 in) by 33.4 centimetres (1 ft 1.1 in)	34°45′43″N 136°30′13″E	
Chinese Lions, ink on paper, by Soga Shōhaku 紙本墨画唐獅子図〈曽我蕭白筆／（旧本堂壁貼付）〉 shihon bokuga karajishi zu (Soga Shōhaku hitsu kyū-hondō kabe haritsuke)	C18	Matsusaka	Chōden-ji (朝田寺)	remounted; formerly on the walls of the hondō; designation includes four cedar doors painted on both sides with phoenixes, rabbits and clover, baku, and pines		225.0 centimetres (7 ft 4.6 in) by 245.3 centimetres (8 ft 0.6 in); doors 169.0 centimetres (5 ft 6.5 in) by 91.7 centimetres (3 ft 0.1 in)	34°34′17″N 136°34′00″E	

== Prefectural Cultural Properties ==
Forty-three properties have been designated at a prefectural level.

Property	Date	Municipality	Ownership	Comments	Image	Dimensions	Coordinates	Ref.
Festival scene, colour on gold ground, byōbu 金地着色祭礼図屏風 kinji chakushoku sairei zu byōbu	early Edo period	Kuwana	Jūnen-ji (十念寺)	pair of six-panel screens		161 centimetres (5 ft 3 in) by 352 centimetres (11 ft 7 in)	35°03′29″N 136°41′24″E	
Keisen Oshō, colour on silk 絹本着色景川和尚像 kenpon chakushoku Keisen oshō zō	1500	Tōin	Zuiō-ji (瑞応寺)			105 centimetres (3 ft 5 in) by 54 centimetres (1 ft 9 in)	35°03′26″N 136°34′50″E	
Matsudaira Sadanobu, colour on silk 絹本着色松平定信像 kenpon chakushoku Matsudaira Sadanobu zō	1787	Kuwana	Chinkokushukoku Jinja (鎮国守国神社)			109 centimetres (3 ft 7 in) by 111.4 centimetres (3 ft 7.9 in)	35°03′55″N 136°41′56″E	
Taima Mandala, colour on silk 絹本著色当麻曼荼羅図 kenpon chakushoku Taima mandara zu	Muromachi period	Kuwana	Jūnen-ji (十念寺)			120.7 centimetres (3 ft 11.5 in) by 121.4 centimetres (3 ft 11.8 in)	35°03′29″N 136°41′24″E	
Zen Master Shingen Daitaku, colour on silk 絹本著色真源大沢禅師像 kenpon chakushoku Shingen Daitaku zenshi zō	1461	Yokkaichi	Daijū-ji (大樹寺)			97.5 centimetres (3 ft 2.4 in) by 49.5 centimetres (1 ft 7.5 in)	35°03′17″N 136°34′02″E	
Zen Master Zengen Taisai, colour on silk 絹本著色禅源大済禅師像 kenpon chakushoku Zengen Taisai zenshi zō	Muromachi period	Yokkaichi	Daijū-ji (大樹寺)			96.3 centimetres (3 ft 1.9 in) by 49.3 centimetres (1 ft 7.4 in)	35°03′17″N 136°34′02″E	
Nirvana painting, colour on silk 絹本著色仏涅槃図 kenpon chakushoku Hotoke nehan zu	Nanboku-chō period	Yokkaichi	Daijū-ji (大樹寺)			169.5 centimetres (5 ft 6.7 in) by 122.5 centimetres (4 ft 0.2 in)	35°03′17″N 136°34′02″E	
Nirvana painting, colour on silk 絹本著色仏涅槃図 kenpon chakushoku Hotoke nehan zu	1561	Yokkaichi	Kannon-ji (観音寺)			159 centimetres (5 ft 3 in) by 122 centimetres (4 ft 0 in)	35°00′31″N 136°36′42″E	
Shaka Triad and the Sixteen Benevolent Deities, colour on silk 絹本著色釈迦三尊十六善神像 kenpon chakushoku Shaka sanzon jūroku zenshin zō	C13	Yokkaichi	Daishō-in (大聖院)			111.7 centimetres (3 ft 8.0 in) by 55.7 centimetres (1 ft 9.9 in)	35°00′31″N 136°36′42″E	

== See also ==
- Cultural Properties of Japan
- List of National Treasures of Japan (paintings)
- List of Cultural Properties of Japan - historical materials (Mie)
- Japanese painting
