= Shōshinge =

The Shōshinge (正信偈) or The Hymn of True Faith was written by the founder of Jōdo Shinshū Buddhism, Shinran. It consists of an outline of the Pure Land Buddhism teaching according to Shinran's personal interpretation. The structure is as follows:

- Homage to Amida
- Adoration to Amida and Shakyamuni Buddhas
- Exhortation to take refuge in Amida
- Teachings of the Patriarchs:
1. Nagarjuna
2. Vasubandhu
3. Tanluan
4. Daochuo
5. Shandao
6. Genshin
7. Hōnen
- Exhortation

The Shōshinge is followed by six verses from Shinran's Sanjō Wasan. The first six verses of the Jōdo Wasan (浄土和讃) section of the Sanjō Wasan (based on Donran's San Amida Butsu Ge), are most frequently used but traditional temples work their way through the whole Sanjō Wasan on an annual basis. In the past Hongan-ji temples chanted the Shōshinge and Wasan daily at 6 AM, but some Jōdo Shinshū temples now reserve the Shōshinge for special holidays due to its length. The Shōshinge can take up to 30 minutes to chant in its entirety.

In Higashi Hongan-ji there are 10 styles of chanting the Shoshinge and in Nishi Hongan-ji 5. Only two or three styles are used regularly. The everyday style is fast, light and monotone whereas the formal styles are often slower, higher toned and more rhythmical.
