= Senju-ji =

Senju-ji (専修寺), also known as Takadayama (高田山), refers to a pair of temples which are the chief Buddhist temples of the Takada branch of Jōdo Shinshū, a Japanese Buddhist sect. The current head temple, Honan Senju-ji, founded in the 15th century, is located in Mie Prefecture. The original head temple, Hon-ji Senju-ji, founded in 1225, is located in Tochigi Prefecture. Both temples are governed by the same abbot.

== Senju-ji Hon-ji ==
Hon-ji Senju-ji
- 本寺専修寺
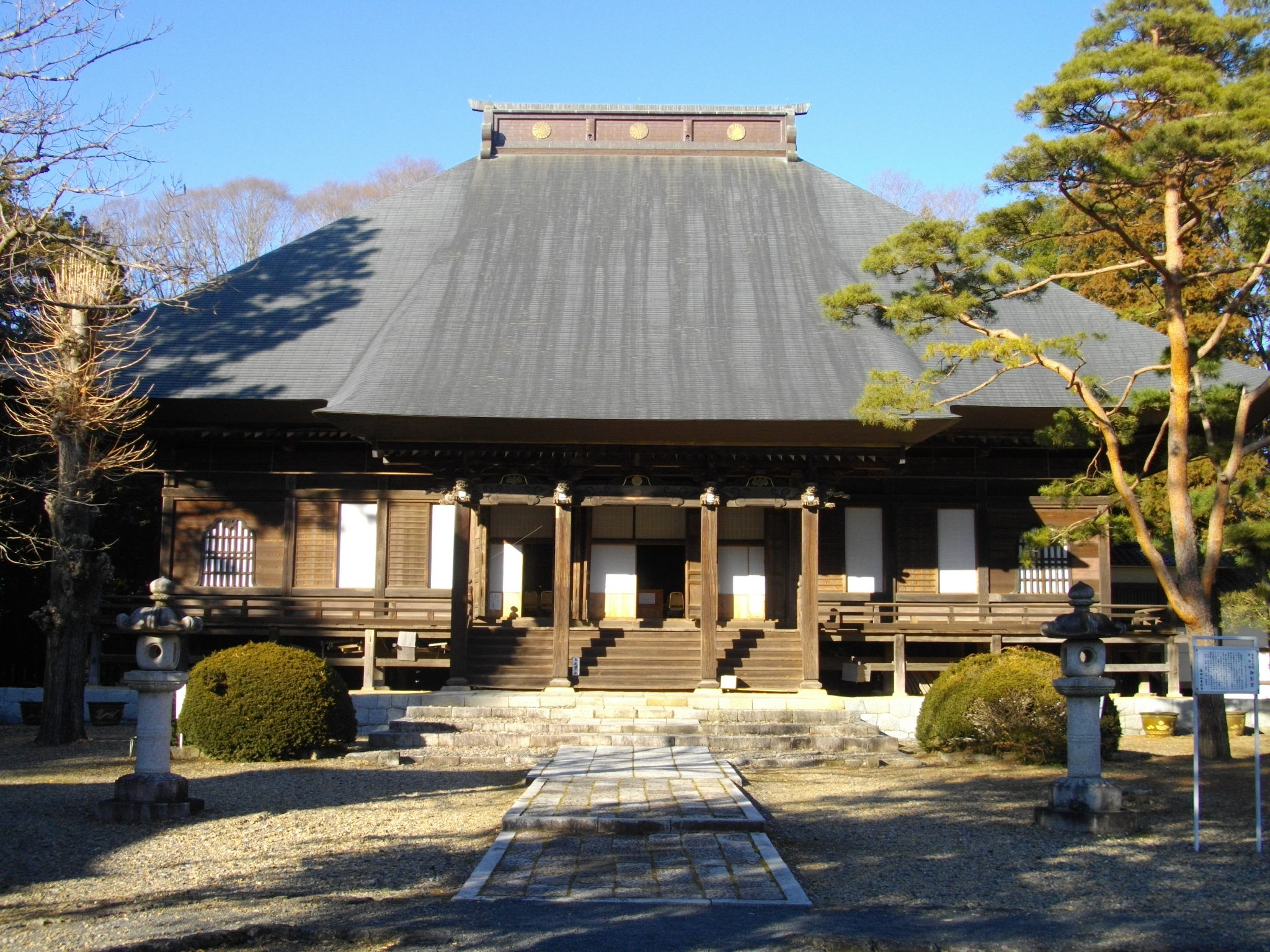
- Hon-ji Senju-ji Miei-do, built 1743, ICP

Religion
- Affiliation: Buddhist
- Deity: Amida Nyorai
- Rite: Jōdo Shinshū
- Status: active

Location
- Location: Takada, Ninomiya-machi, Haga-gun, Tochigi-ken
- Country: Japan
- Interactive map of Hon-ji Senju-ji
- Coordinates: 36°23′39″N 140°01′24″E

Architecture
- Founder: Shinran
- Completed: 1225

Website
- Official website
- National Historic Site of Japan Senju-ji (Japan)

Hon-ji Senju-ji (本寺専修寺) was founded by Shinran, the founder of the Jōdo Shinshū sect in 1225. According to legend, a child appeared to Shinran and presented him with seeds and a staff, which he planted in this place to establish the temple. According to historical documentation, Senju-ji was constructed with the patronage of the Ōuchi clan, rulers of Mooka Castle, to enshrine a Zenko-ji-style Amida triad, and was entrusted to Shinbutsu, one of Shinran's closest disciples. The temple was Number 2 on a pilgrimage route of 24 temples associated with the sect in eastern Japan. Shinran resided and preached here after returning from exile in Echigo.

Soon after its founding, Senju-ji was named an imperial temple (chokuganji) and Shinran made it the center of his activities. Shinran wrote the "Takada Mado" and often sent letters of instruction and books copied by himself to Kyoto. These teaching form the basis of the "Takada school" within the Jōdo Shinshū sect. Shinran resided here for seven years before returning to Kyoto, and his followers made it an important center in spreading his teachings in eastern Japan. It declined after Shinran's death until revived in the middle of the 15th century as the teachings of Rennyo gained in popularity. It was destroyed by fire during the Sengoku period, and although rebuilt in the Edo period, leadership of its branch of the Jōdo Shinshū sect had shifted to the Honzan temple in Mie Prefecture.

The temple's current building dates mainly from the early Edo-period reconstruction. Its precincts were designated a National Historic Site in 1967. Several of the temple's buildings are designated as National Important Cultural Properties.

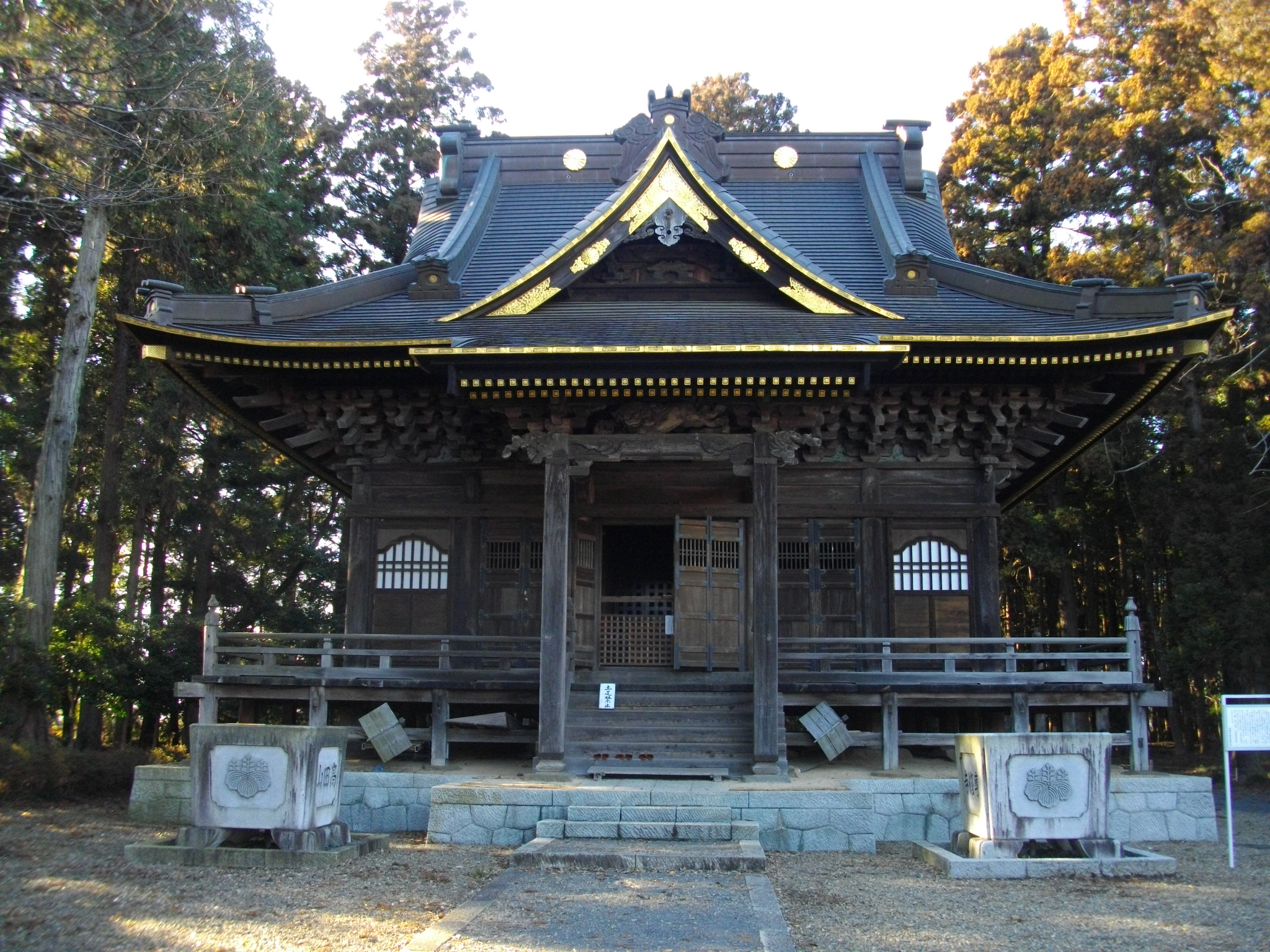
Nyorai-do, built 1701, ICP

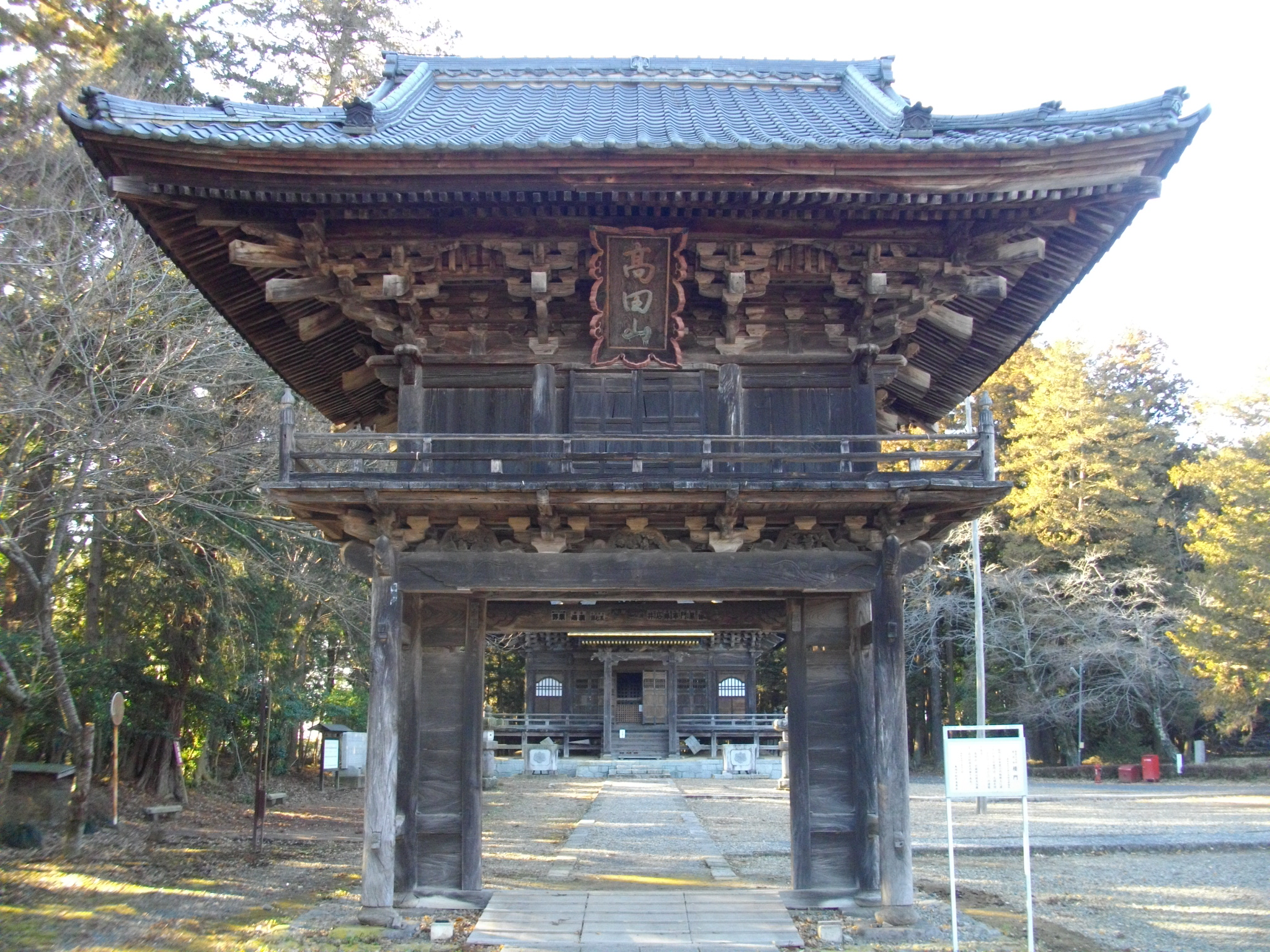
Rōmon, built 1688-1703, ICP

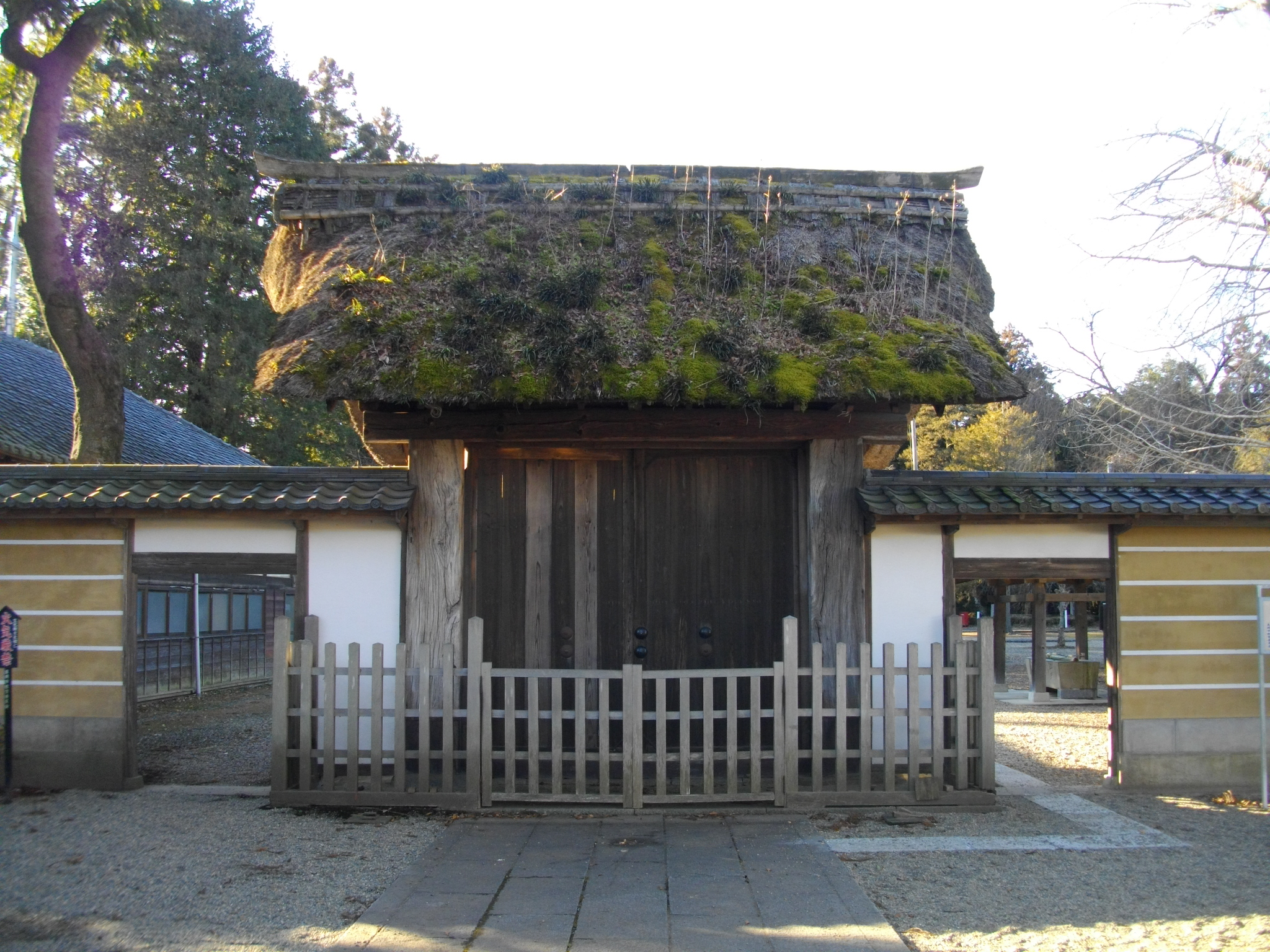
Sōmon, built 1615-1660, ICP

== Senju-ji Honzan ==
Honzan Senju-ji
- 本山専修寺
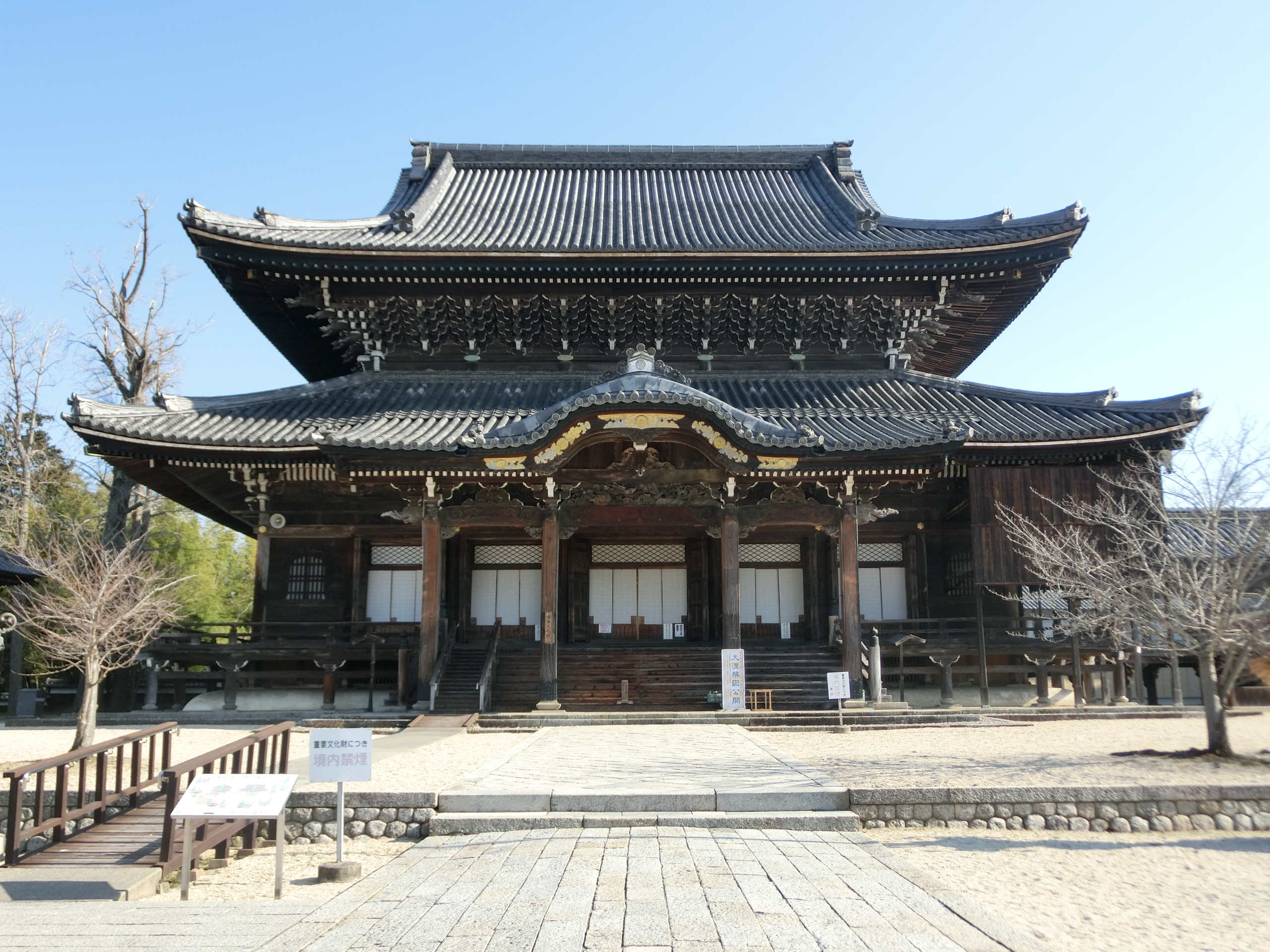
- Nyorai-dō of Honzan Senju-ji

Religion
- Affiliation: Jōdo Shinshū
- Deity: Amida Nyorai
- Status: Head temple

Location
- Location: 2819 Ishinden-chō, Tsu-shi, Mie-ken
- Country: Japan
- Interactive map of Honzan Senju-ji
- Coordinates: 34°45′44″N 136°30′13″E

Architecture
- Founder: Shin'ne
- Completed: 1469–1487

Website
- www.senjuji.or.jp/

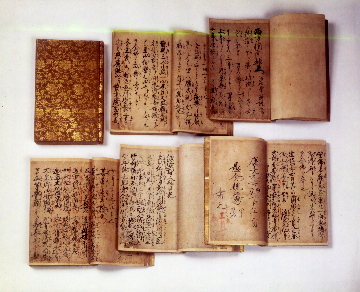
Notes on Guidance Toward Birth in the West

The Honzan Senju-ji (本山専修寺) in the city of Tsu, Mie Prefecture is traditionally said to have been founded by the monk Shinne, who had arrived from Takada. Its predecessor may have been a temple named Muryōju-ji, which was closely related to the imperial court and aristocratic culture. In 1478 it was designated an imperial temple (chokuganji) and in 1574 it became a monzeki temple headed by an Imperial Prince.

Buildings include the Mieidō (1666) and Nyoraidō (1748), both of which escaped fires in the 18th century and have been designated National Treasures.

Important Cultural Properties preserved at the temple include paintings, statues, and documents.

The Notes on Guidance Toward Birth in the West (西方指南抄, saihō shinanshō) is a compilation in six volumes of the words, teachings, and practices of Shinran's teacher Hōnen. According to the colophons, Shinran wrote it at the age of 84. It is the oldest primary source of its kind and the best attested of Shinran's late writings in his own hand. It was designated a National Treasure in 1953.

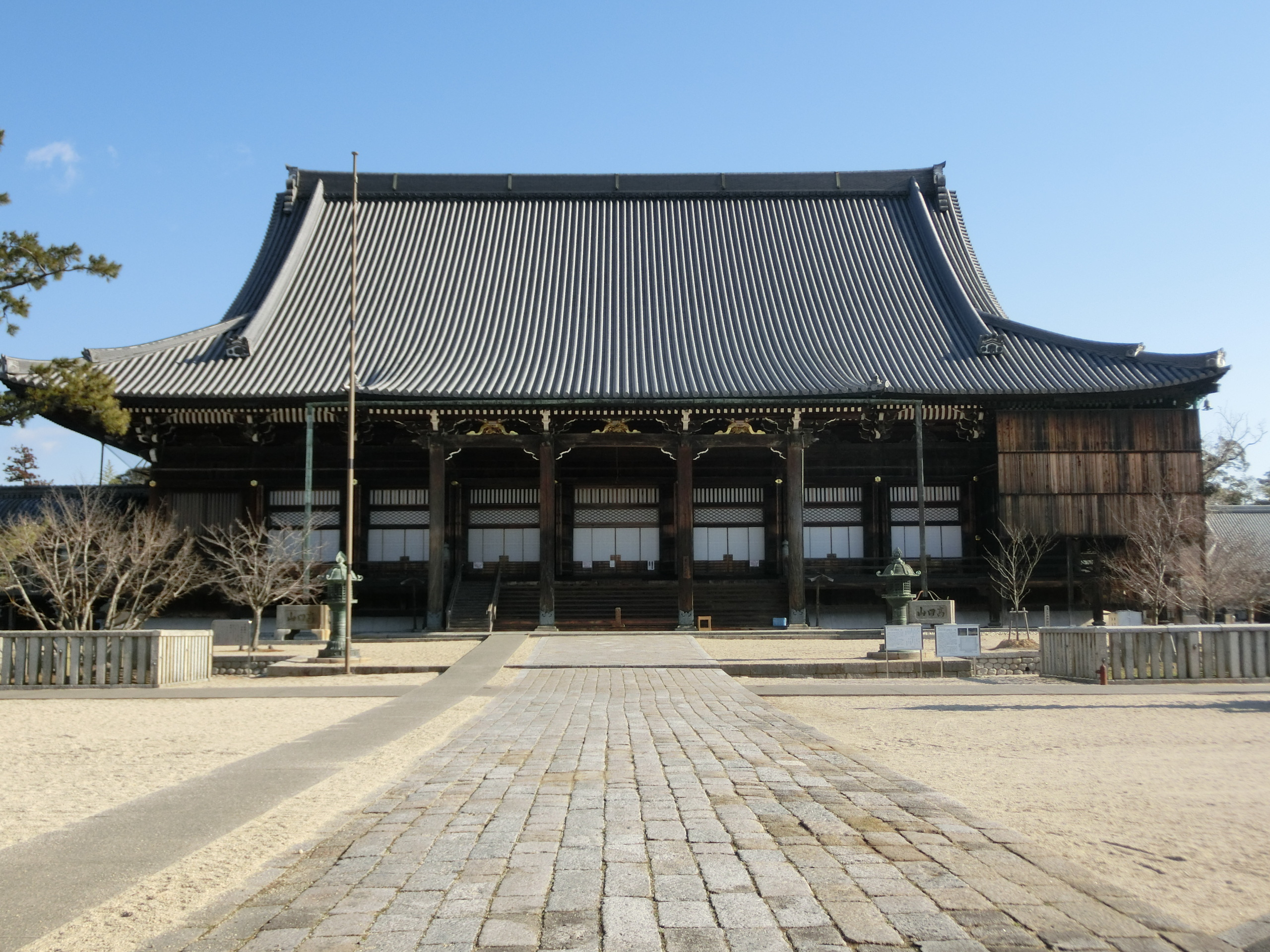
Honzan-Senju-ji Mieido (National Treasure)

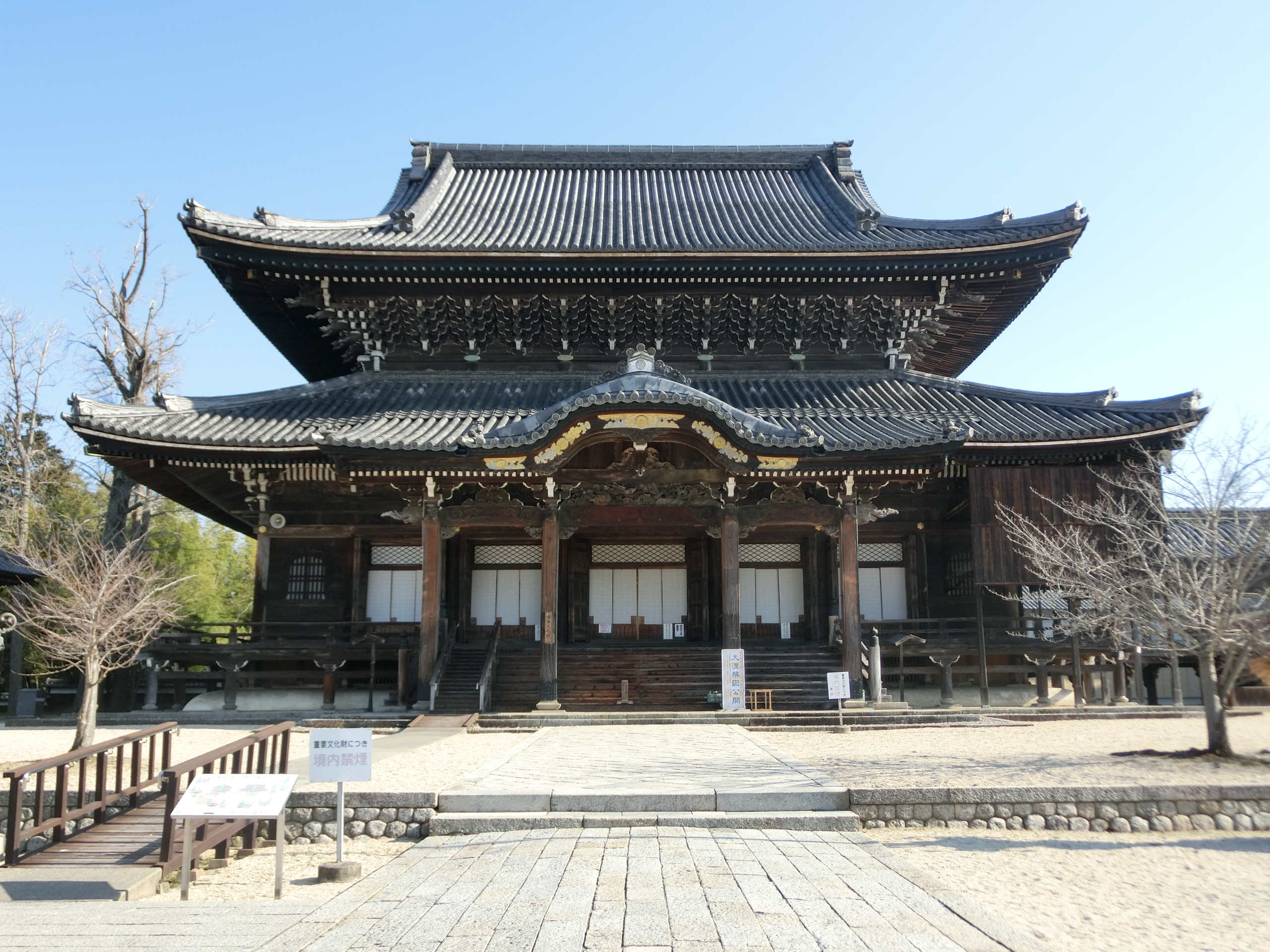
Honzan-Senju-ji Nyoraido (National Treasure)

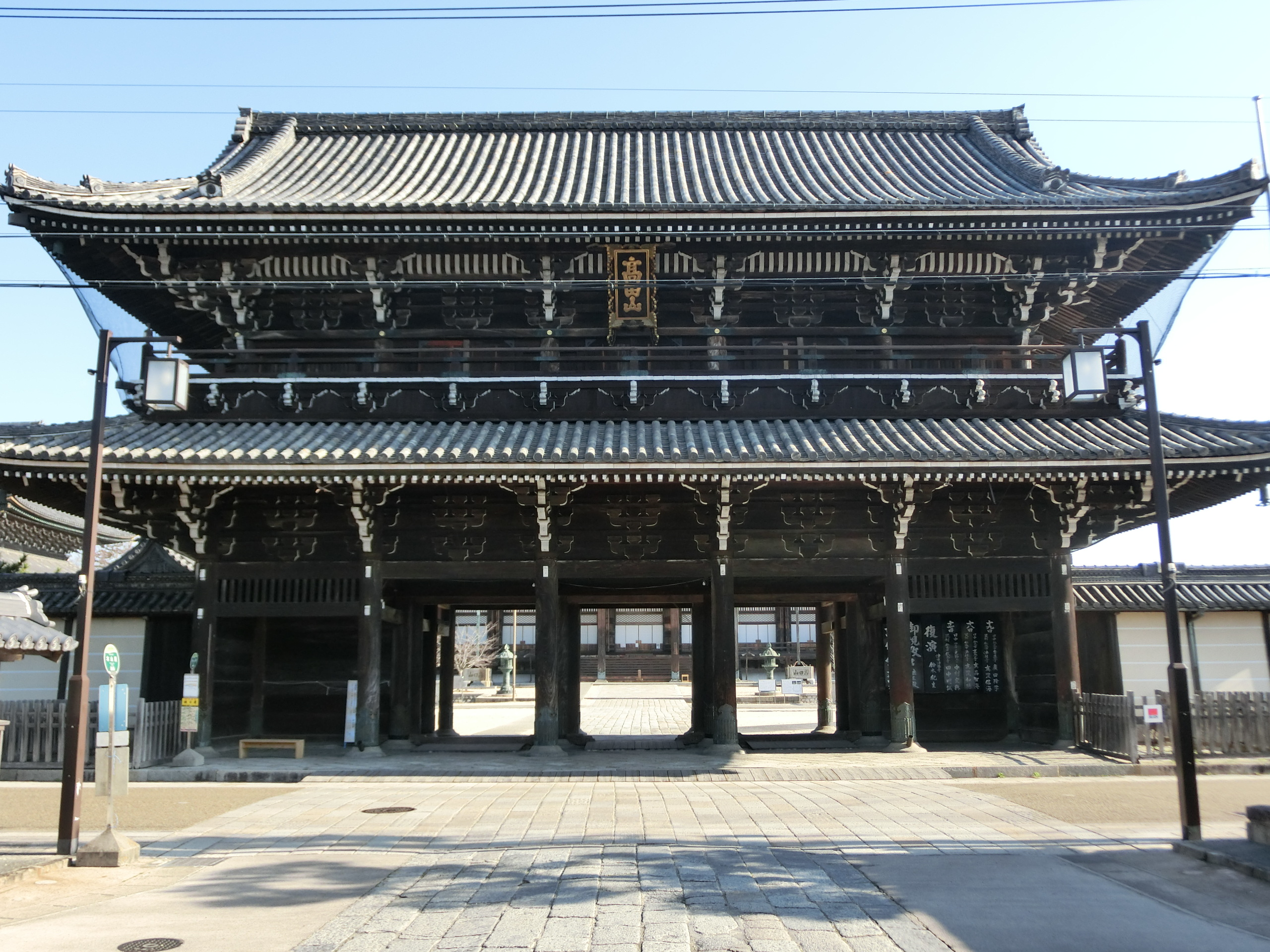
Honzan-Senju-ji Sanmon

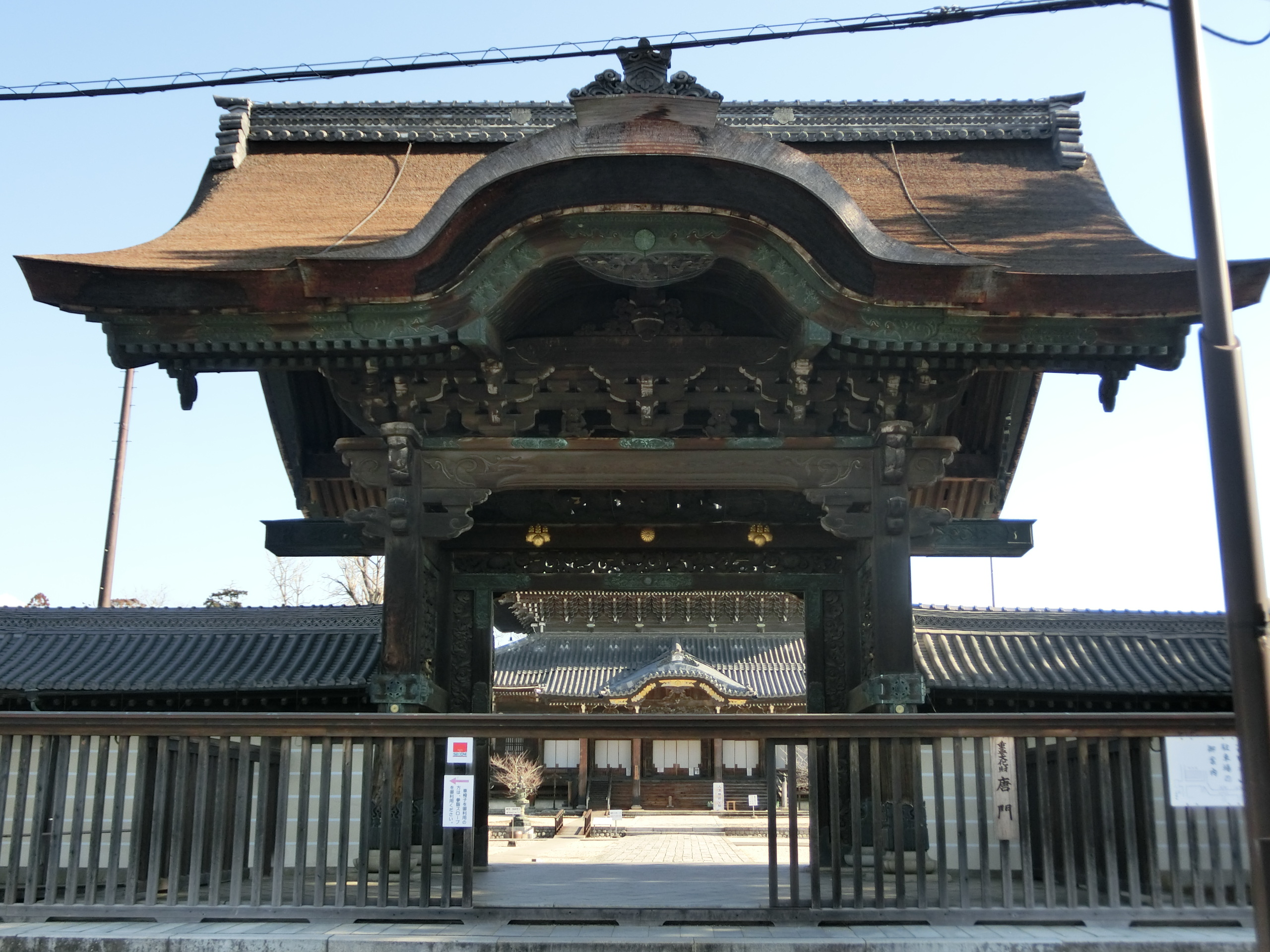
Honzan-Senju-ji Karamon

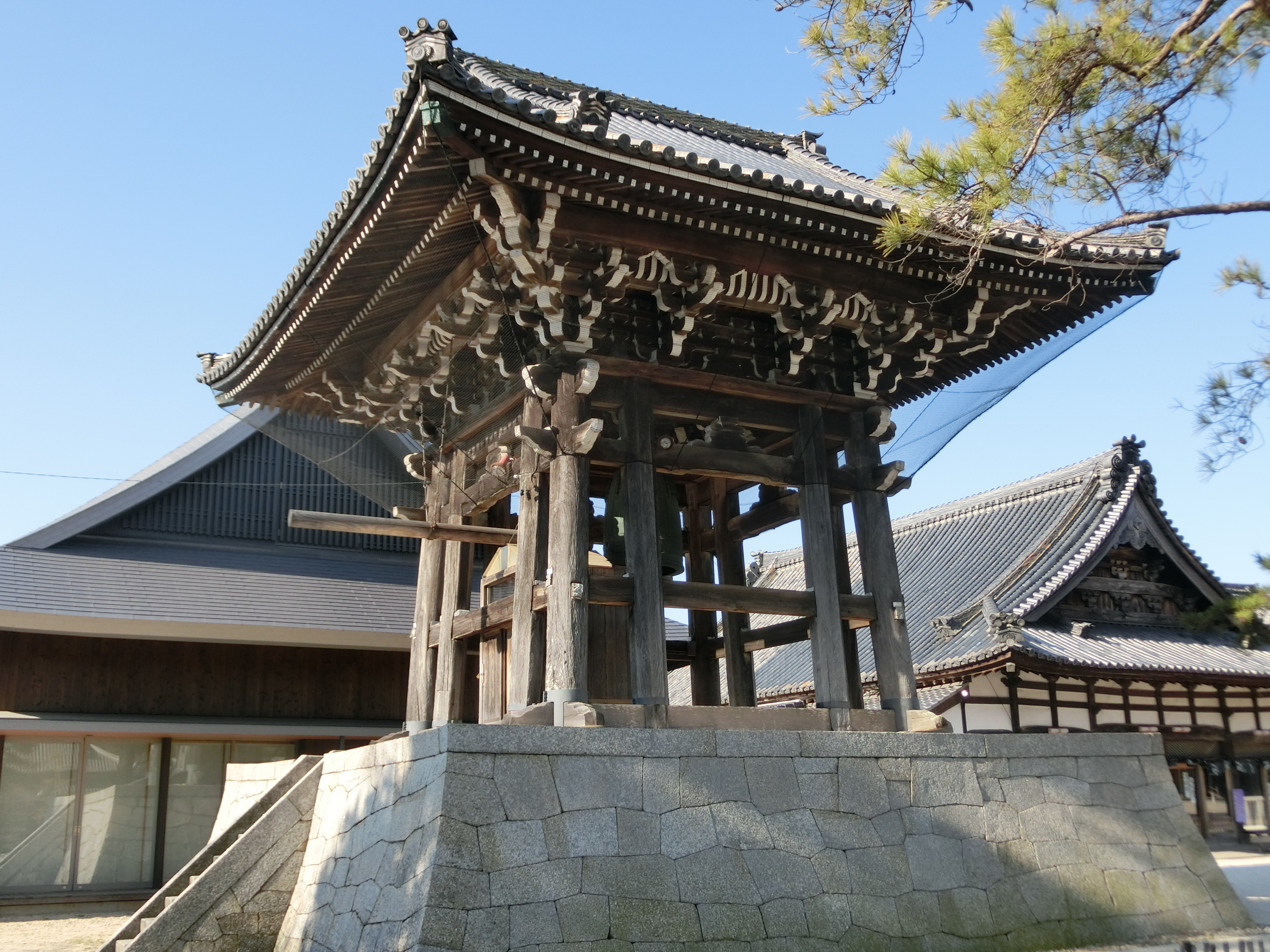
Honzan-Senju-ji Shoro

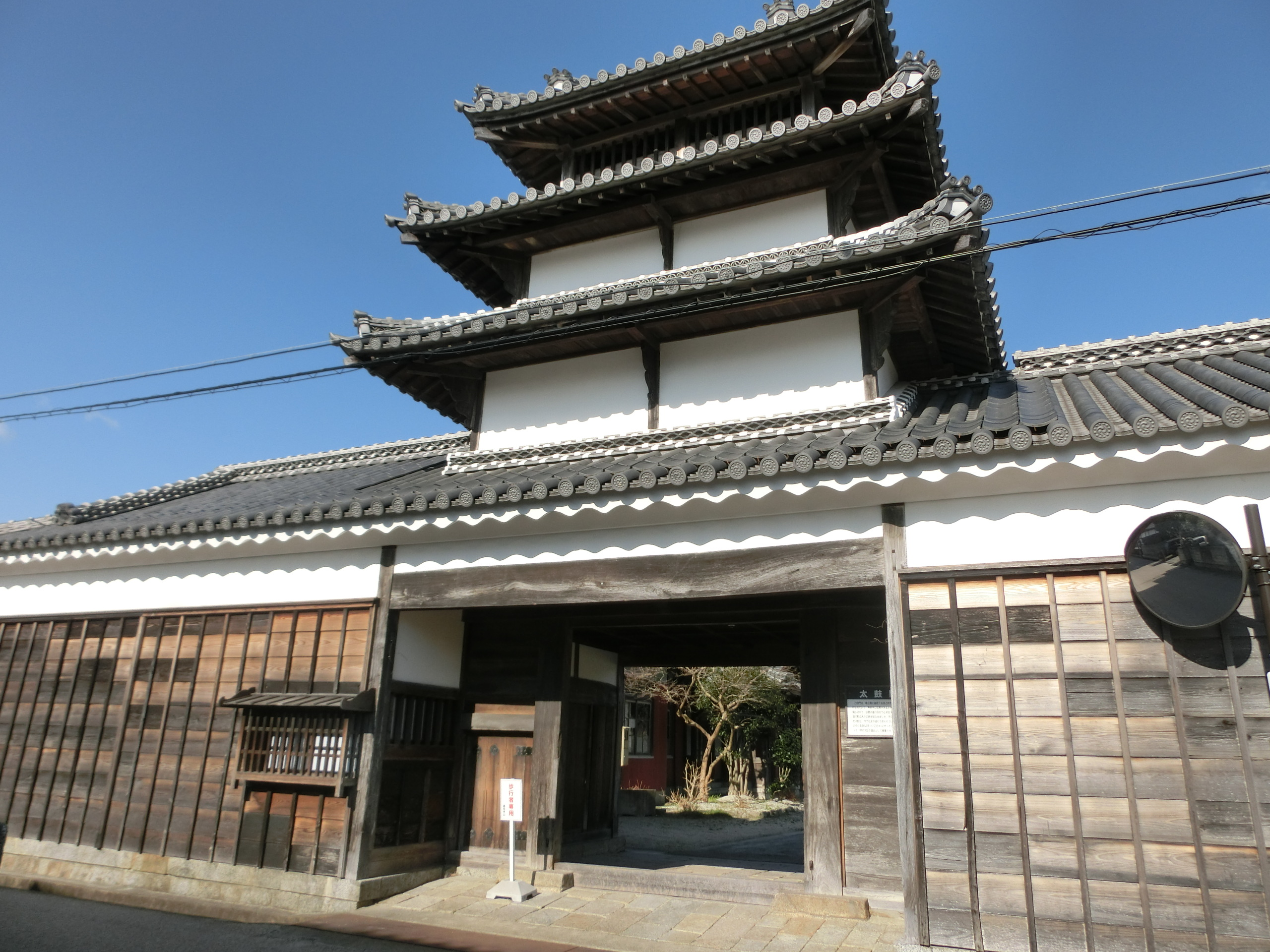
Honzan-Senju-ji Taikomon

== See also ==
- List of National Treasures of Japan (writings: others)
- List of Historic Sites of Japan (Tochigi)
