= Matsuura Takeshirō =

Japanese explorer (1818–1888)

- 松浦武四郎
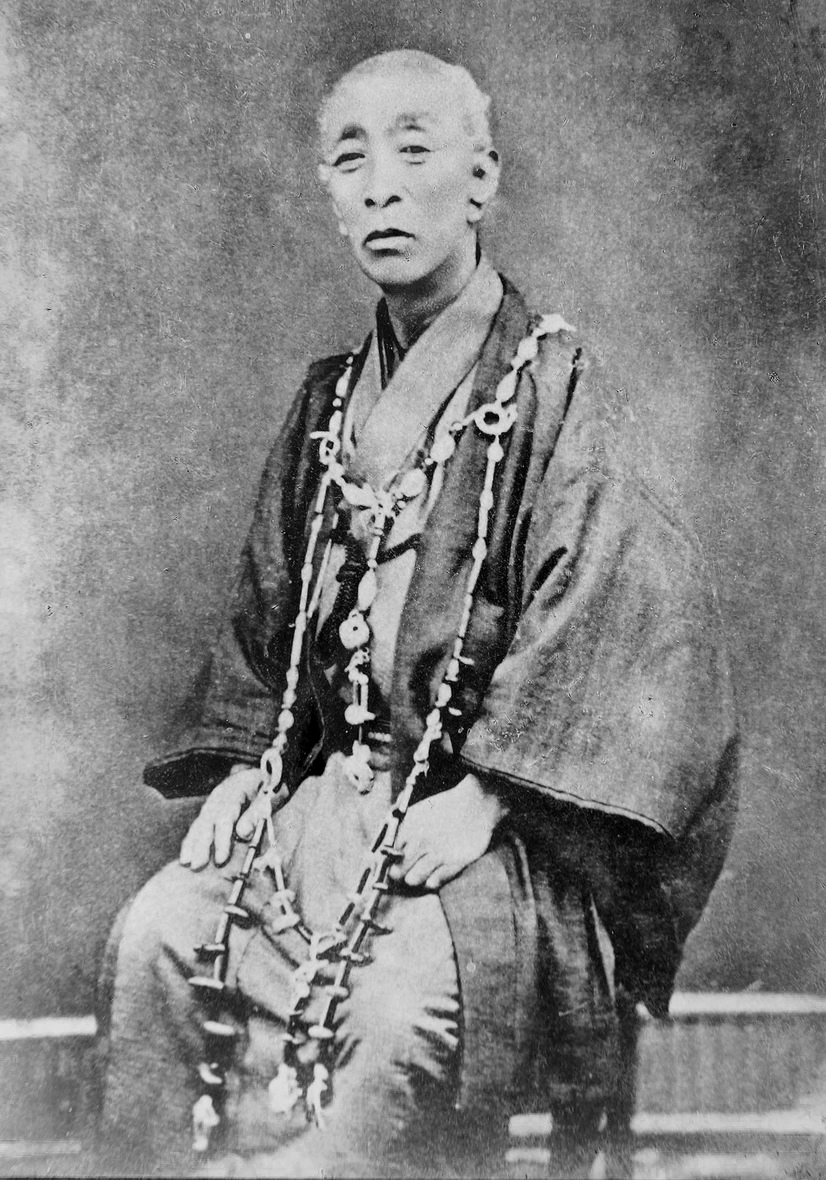
- Matsuura Takeshirō in 1885, with a necklace of magatama, cylindrical kudatama (ja), and crystal beads, largely of the Yayoi period, and now at Seikadō Bunko Art Museum
- Born: 12 March 1818; Matsusaka, Mie Prefecture, Japan
- Died: 10 February 1888 (aged 69)
- Other names: Matsuura Takeshirō (松浦竹四郎) (initial spelling); Matsuura Hiroshi (松浦弘) (imina); Matsuura Shichō (松浦子重) (azana); Bunkei (文桂) (Dharma name); Hokkai Dōjin (北海道人) (art name)

Matsuura Takeshirō (松浦 武四郎; 12 March 1818 – 10 February 1888) was a Japanese explorer, cartographer, writer, painter, priest, and antiquarian. During the late Edo period and Bakumatsu he journeyed six times to Ezo, including to Sakhalin and the Kuriles. In the early Meiji period he was an official in the Hokkaidō Development Commission. Instrumental in the naming of the island and many of its places, he is sometimes referred to as the "godparent of Hokkaidō".

== Name ==
The fourth child of Matsuura Tokiharu (or Keisuke) (松浦時春（桂介）), this is reflected in the shirō (四郎) or "son and fourth child" component of his given name. Born at the Hour of the Tiger in the Year of the Tiger, the Take element of his name comes from the Japanese for bamboo, with which the tiger is closely associated. Later he switched the character for bamboo (竹) with that for valiant or brave (武) (as in Yamato Takeru (日本武尊)). In adulthood he took the official name of Hiroshi (弘), his imina, his azana being Shichō (子重). When he entered the Buddhist priesthood in Nagasaki at the age of twenty-one he assumed the Dharma name Bunkei (文桂). He is also known to have used the art name Hokkai Dōjin (北海道人) from 1859; this might be parsed as "man of Hokkaidō", "man well-versed in north sea ways", or "recluse of the northern seas".

== Life ==
Matsuura Takeshirō was born on the sixth day of the second month of Bunka 15 (1818) in the village of Sugawa, later Onoe (ja), now Matsusaka, in what was then Ise Province, now Mie Prefecture. The samurai family is said to have had ancestral connections with the Matsuura clan of Hirado Domain in Hizen Province, northern Kyūshū. Takeshirō's father Tokiharu was a devotee of the tea ceremony and haikai and had studied under fellow Matsusaka scion Kokugaku scholar Motoori Norinaga. As his older brother was destined to take over as head of the family, Takeshirō knew from a young age he would have to venture forth in the world. Billed as his birthplace, his boyhood home in Matsusaka (designated a municipal Historic Site) lies on the Ise Kaidō (ja), the road that was once thronged with pilgrims to Ise Jingū, the 1830 pilgrimage alone seeing some five million visit the Grand Shrine.

The young Takeshirō began calligraphy lessons at the local Sōtō Zen temple of Shinkaku-ji (真覚寺) at the age of seven. As a boy he showed signs of his later energy, playing on the temple roof, and enjoyed reading illustrated books of meisho or famous places. He also showed early literary promise himself, composing aged eleven a haiku on the subject of returning wild geese that met with the approbation of his father, and he began to manifest his later antiquarian leanings, copying pictures of temple bells from old books. When he was twelve, the chanting of Raiō Oshō (来応和尚), the priest who was his calligraphy teacher, to succour a girl spirit obsessed by a fox, left a great impression on his young mind; the expelled fox was subsequently enshrined as Seishun Inari Daimyōjin (正節稲荷大明神), and he would later write of this episode in his autobiography. Early in life he had ideas of becoming a Buddhist priest himself, but his parents discouraged the notion. Aged thirteen, he was sent to the school run by Confucian scholar Hiramatsu Rakusai (平松楽斎), where he studied Chinese and had the opportunity to meet visiting scholars from all over the country, including Yanagawa Seigan (ja); he continued his studies there until he was sixteen.

In Tenpō 4 (1833) he abruptly set out from home, seemingly spurred on not only by wanderlust but also financial indiscretion, having been obliged secretly to sell some family heirlooms to settle debts run up buying books and antique curios. A letter written shortly after his departure notes his intentions to travel first to Edo, then Kyōto, before heading to Nagasaki, whence he would sail for Morokoshi, and perhaps even onwards to Tenjiku. Though he did not make it as far as China and India, his travels did take him along the Tōkaidō to Edo, where he stayed with Yamaguchi Gusho (ja), learning from him the art of seal carving that is understood to have supported him on his travels, before heading along the Nakasendō to Zenkō-ji; he also climbed nearby Mount Togakushi (ja), in what is now Myōkō-Togakushi Renzan National Park. The following year, yatate and notebooks to hand, he travelled from Kinki to Chūgoku and Shikoku and back; the next, through the Kinki, Hokuriku, Kōshin'etsu, Tōhoku (including Sendai and Matsushima), Kantō (where he served for a period at the mansion of Mizuno Tadakuni in Edo), Chūbu, and Kinki regions to Shikoku again; in 1836 he followed the Shikoku 88 temple pilgrimage route, then traversed the Kinki, San'in, and San'yō regions (including Tomonoura); the next year took him from San'yō around Kyūshū, due to travel restrictions entering Satsuma disguised as a Buddhist monk. In 1838, at the age of 21, he was taken seriously ill in Nagasaki during an epidemic. His father died that year, his sister and a brother having died several years previously. While in Nagasaki, encouraged by the Zen monk who nursed him back to health, he entered the Buddhist priesthood, at Zenrin-ji (禅林寺), going on to serve as priest at Senkō-ji (ja) in Hirado for the next three years. In 1842 he attempted to cross from Tsushima to Chōsen (Korea), but due to sakoku or the "closed country" policy, was unable to do so. His mother died at around this time. It was while in area of Nagasaki at the age of 26 that Matsuura heard from a village headman tales of Ezo and Karafuto, and also about the increasing Russian interest in the region and the approach of Russian ships. In 1844, for the first time in nine years, he returned home, paying his respects at the graves of his parents and visiting Ise Jingū, before setting out for the north.

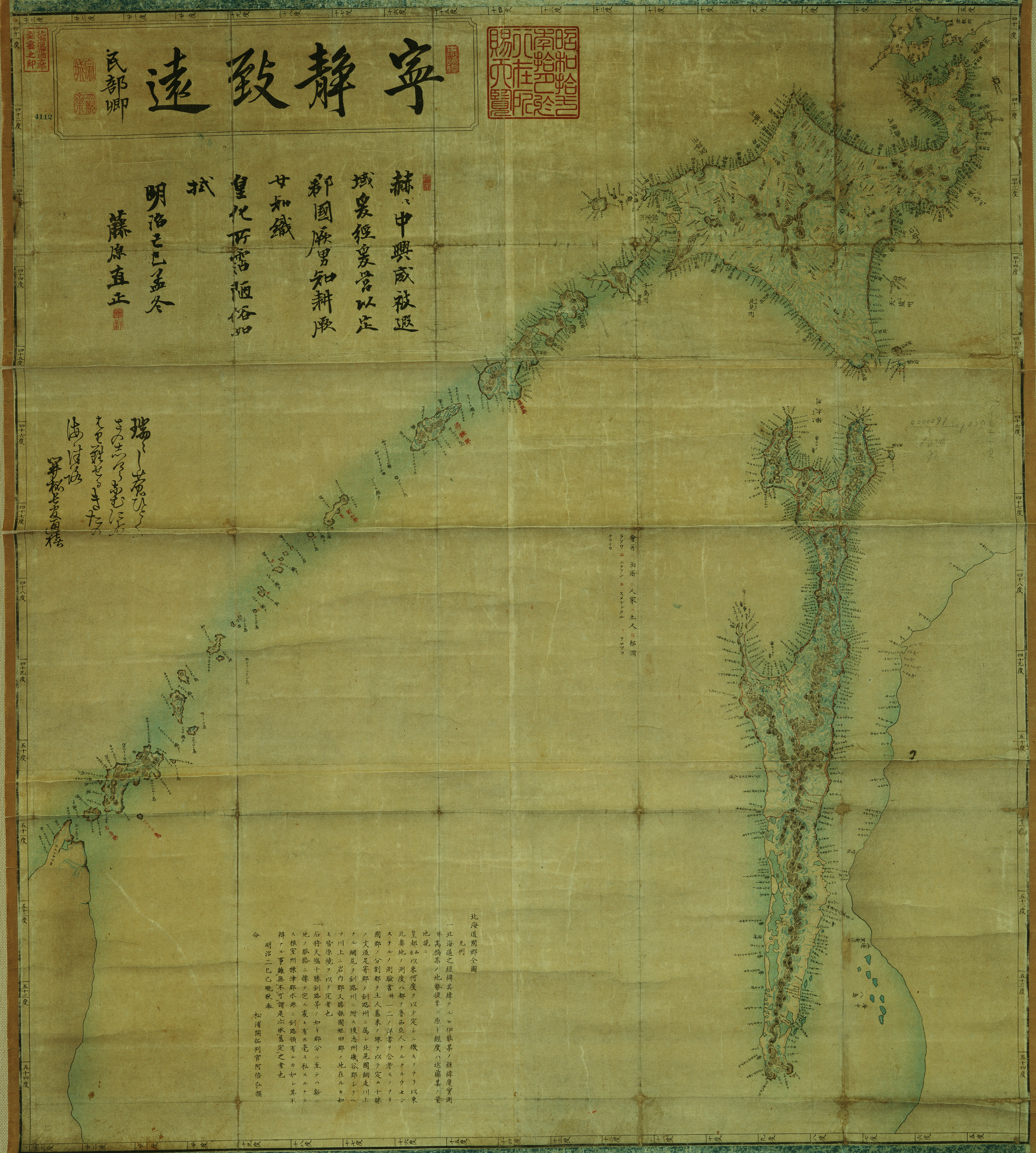
Map of Hokkaidō, Sakhalin, and the Kuriles by Matsuura Takeshirō, issued in woodblock format in 1869 by the Hokkaidō Development Commission (Hokkaido University Library)

Having reached as far as what is now Ajigasawa at the northern end of Honshū, he was unable to cross over to Ezo due to strict restrictions on travel imposed by the Matsumae Domain, turning back instead to Rikuzen Province. In 1845, at the age of 28, for the first time he crossed the Tsugaru Straits, to Esashi, which he left disguised as a merchant, travelling the length of the island for the next seventh months: he walked, with local Ainu as his guides, along the southern Pacific coast from Hakodate to the tip of the Shiretoko Peninsula, where he erected a marker inscribed "Ise Province, Ichishi District, Kumozu River, South: Matsuura Takeshirō" (勢州一志郡雲出川南 松浦竹四郎), before making his way back again to Hakodate, and thence to Edo. The following year, attaching himself as manservant Unpei (雲平) to Nishikawa Shunan (西川春庵), he walked from Esashi along the Sea of Japan coast to Sōya, crossing from there to Karafuto, where they traversed the island and explored the east and west coasts of the southern end of what is now Sakhalin. Crossing back over the Sōya Strait, parting company, he walked the coast of the Sea of Okhotsk to the Shiretoko Peninsula before returning to Sōya by boat, then overland via Ishikari, Chitose, and Yūfutsu back to Esashi, and thence again to Honshū; while in Esashi he met Confucian scholar Rai Mikisaburō (ja), the two competing each to compose a hundred poems and carve a hundred seals in one day. Three years later, in 1849, on his third Ezo expedition, he sailed from Hakodate to Kunashiri and Etorofu. He had now covered the whole of the north. In the words of Frederick Starr, "these journeys were epoch-making", with results of geographic, literary, and political significance. Again, "cartography for those regions practically dates from Matsuura". For this, equipped only with a pocket compass, he relied on his own pacing combined with observation from high points. At the same time, as well as active study of the Ainu language, he was becoming increasingly alive to the plight of the Ainu at the hands of unscrupulous traders and agents of the Matsumae Domain.

He did not return to Ezo until 1856, some seven years later. In the interim, he published multi-volume "diaries" of his first three visits, and interacted with many leading figures of this turbulent period. His house began to be frequented by the shishi or "men of high purpose" and he was in contact with sonnō jōi thinkers Aizawa Seishisai and Fujita Tōko, as well as Ikeuchi Daigaku (ja), Rai Mikisaburō (ja), Umeda Unpin (ja), and Yanagawa Seigan (ja). 1853 saw the arrival of Perry's "Black Ships" in Edo Bay; when they returned the following year, at the instigation of the Uwajima Domain, Matsuura Takeshirō followed their progress, giving rise to his Shimoda Diaries. He was also in touch with Yoshida Shōin who, in an 1853 letter of introduction to an Ōsaka gunsmith, wrote critically of the Bakufu's response to Perry's arrival at Uraga and Putyatin's at Nagasaki, while recommending Matsuura Takeshirō as one who had left his mark all over the country, had intimate knowledge of Ezo, and had the question of coastal defence at his heart. In his autobiography, Matsuura Takeshirō writes of Yoshida Shōin's stay over the New Year of 1853/4, when they stayed up till dawn discussing this topic. After the 1854 Japan–US Treaty of Peace and Amity, 1855 brought the Treaty of Commerce and Navigation between Japan and Russia; exercised by the need for greater oversight and security on the northern borders, that year also the bakufu assume direct control of Ezo, excepting the immediate environs of Matsumae Castle.

Under the new shōgun Tokugawa Iesada, and with the situation in Ezo in light of Russian activity increasingly a priority, the significance of his endeavours began to receive recognition from the top: in 1855 he was given ten ryō of gold by the bakufu, with twice as much arriving in the next few days from Tokugawa Nariaki, daimyō of Mito Domain, and Date Yoshikuni, daimyō of Sendai Domain. He received instructions to travel to Ezo again, this time as an employee of the bakufu, for further work on its geography, to investigate its mountains and rivers, and the potential for new roads. Over the next three years, three visits would ensue—indeed, one theory sees those earlier not as private initiatives, but operations in the pay of the bakufu, connecting this to the obstacles placed in his way by the Matsumae Domain. Joining the expedition headed by Mukōyama Gendayū (ja), he completed a circuit of the island, travelling clockwise from Hakodate, also crossing the Sōya Strait to the northern regions of Ezo, as far as what is now Poronaysk, on Sakhalin. Mukōyama died along the way, Matsuura himself so ill that he composed a death poem. The following year, abandoning plans for further investigation of Sakhalin, he followed the courses of the Ishikari and Teshio Rivers, from their mouths to their upstream regions. His final visit, in 1858, included investigation of the interior of the centre and the east of the island, around Akan. His surveys covered both physical and human geography, and suggestions for the development of the land and the advancement of its inhabitants. Records of these three years run to 117 volumes, while he also aimed at a wider audience through works such as Ezo Manga and a series of travelogues full of detail on the local mountains and rivers, flaura and fauna, and the customs, legends, and material culture of the Ainu he encountered along the way. Sympathetic to their plight, his 1858 Account of the People of Ezo in Recent Times (近世蝦夷人物誌), which includes their sufferings at the hands of traders and officials of the Matsumae Domain, was refused for publication by the Hakodate bugyō.

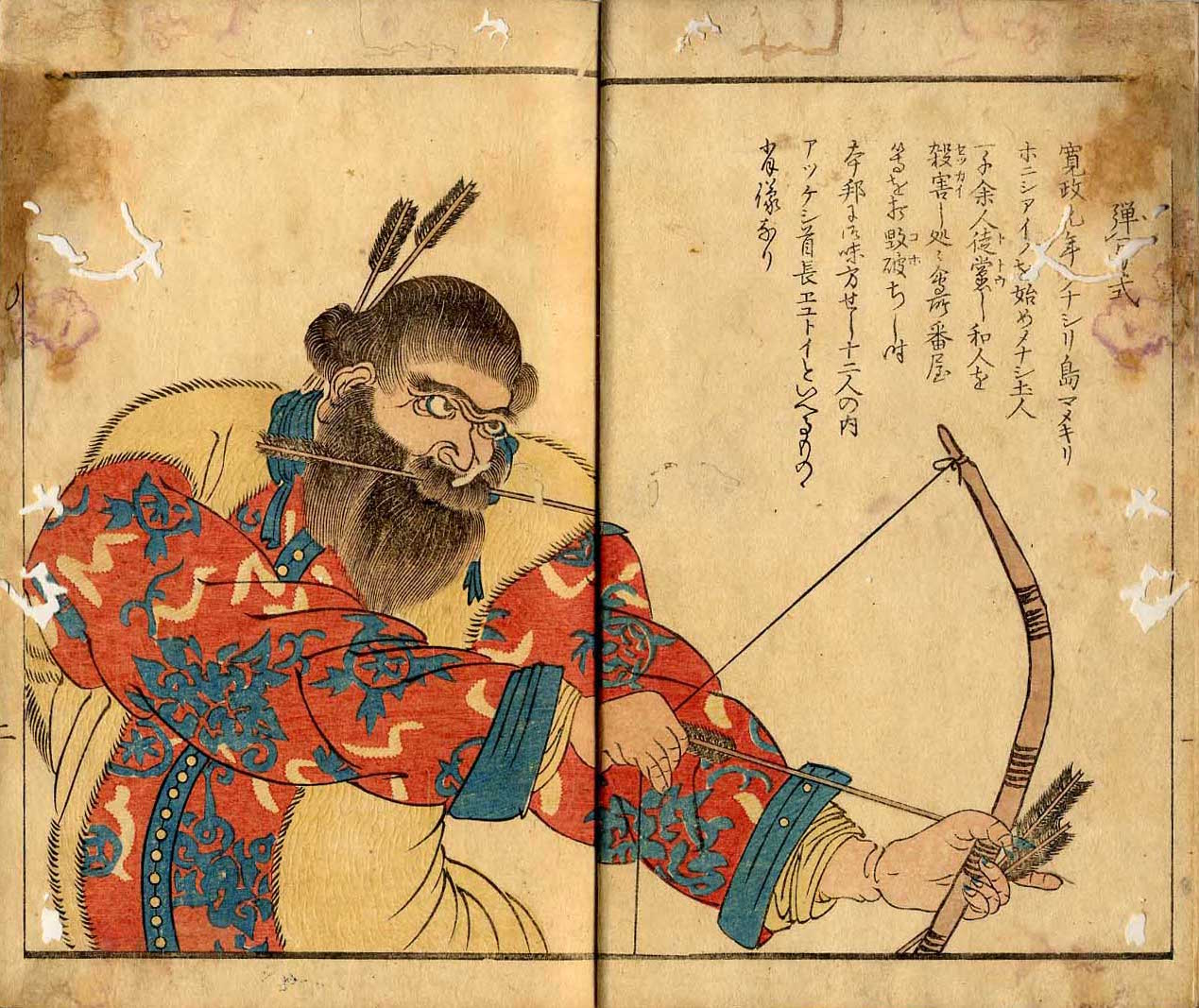
From Ezo Manga (1859); through works such as this and his later series of travelogues, Matsuura Takeshirō brought an understanding of Ezo and of the Ainu to a wider readership

As Bakumatsu drew to its close, as an authority on the north, Matsuura Takeshirō was visited by the likes of Ōkubo Toshimichi and Saigō Takamori, leading figures in the Meiji Restoration. Ōkubo advocated a role for him in the new government, with responsibilities relating to the development of Ezo, and, after conducting a survey of the Tōkaidō, he was assigned a position in the administration of the short-lived Hakodate Prefecture (ja) and elevated to the Junior Fifth Court Rank, Lower Grade. Shortly after he became Adjutant to the Governor of Tōkyō Prefecture; he was involved in dividing the prefecture into districts; and he was a herald during the transfer of the capital from Kyōto. With the establishment of the Hokkaidō Development Commission (ja) in 1869, he was appointed a Development Commissioner (開拓判官). While in post, he focused on official nomenclature, for the island's districts and what are now its subprefectures, as well as finding a replacement for "Ezo" itself. Putting forward six alternatives, (Note: The six names Matsuura Takeshirō put forward for consideration were Hitakamidō (日高見道), Hokkaidō (北加伊道), Kaihōdō (海北道), Kaitōdō (海東道), Tōhokudō (東北道), and Chishimadō (千島道).) the government chose Hokkaidō (北加伊道), substituting the character for sea (海) for the two characters for kai (加伊), which he had drawn from Legends of Atsuta Shrine (熱田大神宮縁起), the repository of the sword Kusanagi no Tsurugi, one of the Three Sacred Treasures, having first heard of kai as an old Ainu endonym for the Ainu people from an elder encountered during his journey up the Teshio River in 1857; thus was "Hokkaidō" born. Indeed, since he went by the art name Hokkai Dōjin (北海道人), it could even be said his alias became the island's name, and Matsuura Takeshirō is sometimes referred to for these reasons as "the Godparent of Hokkaidō". He also had his Fifth Court Rank raised and was given a hundred ryō of gold. In 1870, however, he retired from his post, unhappy with the direction taken and frustrated in his attempts to approve the lot of the Ainu, the island's traders seemingly having worked to isolate him within the commission while sending bribes to its head Higashikuze Michitomi, who refused to countenance his views. He also surrendered his court rank, becoming a shizoku of Tōkyō Prefecture, and receiving a government pension equivalent to the income of fifteen men.

Now 53, his house in Tōkyō was visited by artists, poets, and statesmen. He continued to travel, collecting old coins, magatama, unusually shaped rocks, and the like, which he catalogued and exhibited. He also engaged in the appraisal of artworks and dealing. He followed up his lifelong interest in Sugawara no Michizane, as man, Tenjin, as kami, dedicating a series of oversized bronze mirrors, 1 metre (3 ft 3 in) in diameter and weighing 120 kilograms (260 lb), to Tenmangū shrines founded in his honour, first Kitano Tenmangū (with a map of Hokkaidō, Karafuto, and Chishima on the mirror's reverse), later Ōsaka Tenmangū and Dazaifu Tenmangū, as well as at Ueno Tōshō-gū and Kimpusen-ji, and also smaller mirrors at twenty further shrines to Tenjin. In 1881, he commissioned a painting from Kawanabe Kyōsai entitled Hokkai Dōjin Taking a Nap Under the Trees, a reworking of the traditional nirvāṇa painting (or nehanzu) that, completed five years later, shows a snoozing Matsuura Takeshirō surrounded by objects from his collection, in place of the usual mourners. At the end of his seventh decade, he climbed Mount Ōdaigahara three times, maintaining the mountain trails and rest huts, as well as Mount Fuji. In Meiji 21 (1888), struck down by meningitis, and elevated once more to Fifth Court Rank, he died of a cerebral haemorrhage. His funeral expenses covered by the Emperor, he was initially laid to rest in Asakusa, his remains subsequently transferred and divided, in accordance with his last will and testament (entitled One Thousand Tortoises, Ten Thousand Cranes), between the Somei Cemetery (ja) in Tōkyō and his beloved Mount Ōdaigahara.

== One-mat room ==
Around two years before his death, Matsuura Takeshirō appended to his house in Kanda a one-mat room, observing that, while various one-and-a-half-mat huts had been built, this would be the first measuring only one mat. Helped by being 4 feet 8 inches (1.42 m) (alternatively, around 4 feet 10 inches (1.47 m)) in height, he proceeded to live in this room for the remainder of his life. Named One-Mat Room (一畳敷, Ichijōjiki) or Grass Abode (草の舎, Kusa no Ya), built into and adorning it were nearly a hundred old parts from temples, shrines, and historic buildings across the country, from Miyagi to Miyazaki, sent to him by his friends, the name plaque being burnt wood from the west gate of Shitennō-ji, window surrounds coming from Kōfuku-ji and Ishiyama-dera, a beam that was formerly a pillar at Kennin-ji, and other such from Byōdō-in, Daian-ji, Hōryū-ji, Kōdai-ji, Mii-dera, Tōfuku-ji, Ise Jingū, Izumo Taisha, Kasuga Taisha, Itsukushima Jina, Tsurugaoka Hachimangū, Kitano Tenmangū, Hiei-zan, Togetsu Bridge, Kumamoto Castle, even the torii from Emperor Go-Daigo's mausoleum in Yoshino. Some eighty-nine items are catalogued with illustrations and detail as to their provenance in his Solicitation for Wooden Fragments (木片勧進). His wishes that the room be cremated with him were disregarded; changing hands several times since his death, it is now preserved at the Taizansō (泰山荘) villa in the grounds of International Christian University in Tōkyō.

== Select writings ==
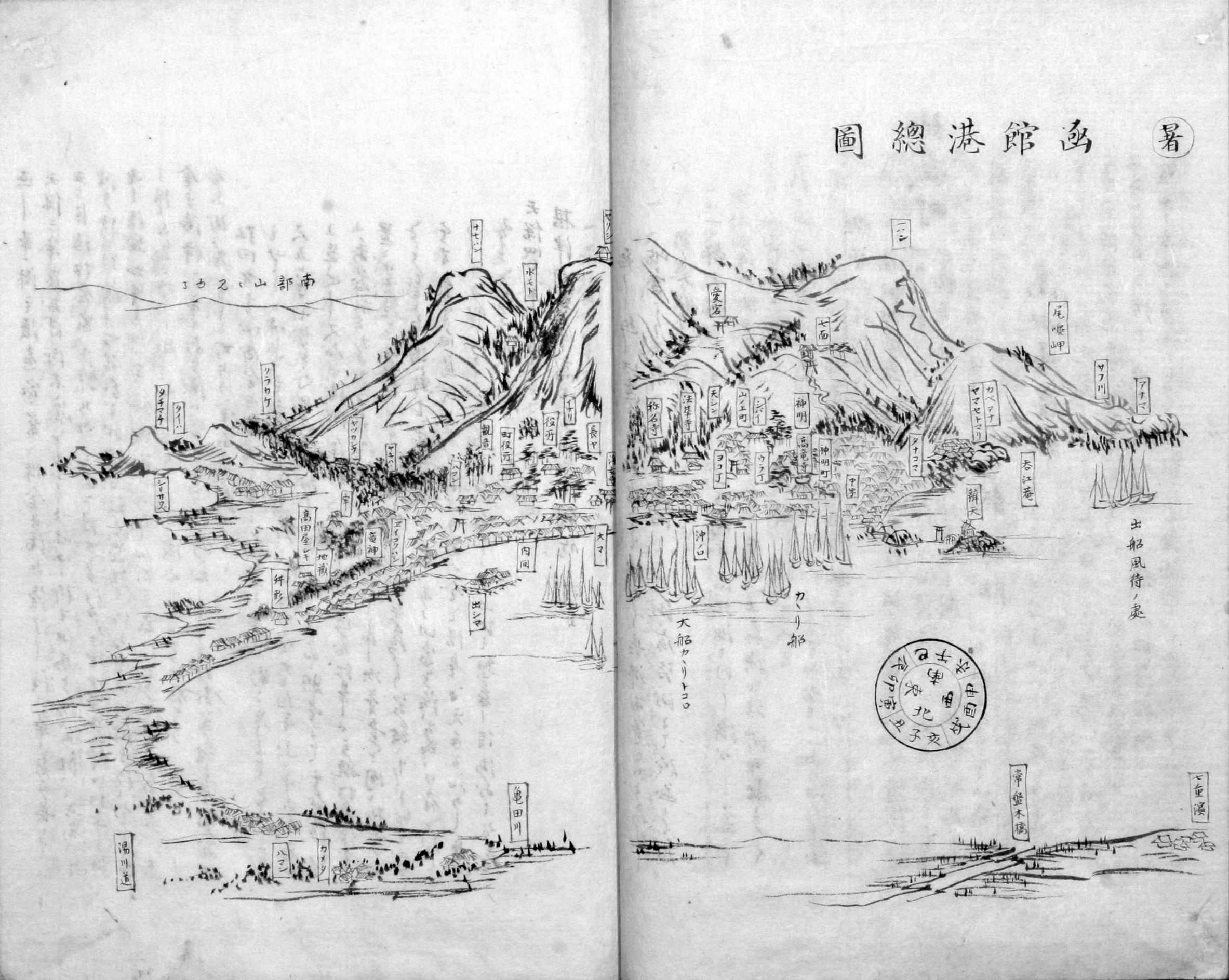
View of Hakodate Port from his Diary of the First Voyage to Ezo (1850) (Hakodate City Central Library) (Municipal Tangible Cultural Property)

- Journal of the Western Seas (西海雑誌) (1843)
- Journal from the Shikoku Henro Road (四国遍路道中雑誌) (1844)
- Diary of the First Voyage to Ezo (初航蝦夷日誌) (1850) (12 volumes)
- Diary of the Second Voyage to Ezo (再航蝦夷日誌) (1850) (14 volumes)
- Diary of the Third Voyage to Ezo (三航蝦夷日誌) (1850) (8 volumes)
- New Leaves of Japanese Poetry (新葉和歌集) (1850)
- Shimoda Diaries (下田日誌) (1853)
- Records from Surveys of the West, East, and North (按西・按東・按北扈従録) (1859) (32 volumes) (on the 1856 expedition)
- Diary of Investigations into the Geography and Landscape of East and West Ezo in Yin Fire Snake (1857) (丁巳東西蝦夷山川地理取調日誌) (1859) (23 volumes)
- Diary of Investigations into the Geography and Landscape of East and West Ezo in Yang Earth Horse (1858) (戊午東西蝦夷山川地理取調日誌) (1859) (62 volumes)
- Ezo Manga (蝦夷漫画) (1859)
- A Personal Account of North Ezo (北蝦夷余誌) (1860)
- Tokachi Diaries (十勝日誌) (1861)
- Yūbari Diaries (夕張日誌) (1862)
- Nosappu Diaries (納沙布日誌) (1863)
- Shiretoko Diaries (知床日誌) (1863)
- Teshio Diaries (天塩日誌) (1863)
- Diaries of Eastern Ezo (東蝦夷日誌) (1865) (8 volumes)
- Diaries of Western Ezo (西蝦夷日誌) (1865) (6 volumes)

== Hokkaidō Heritage ==
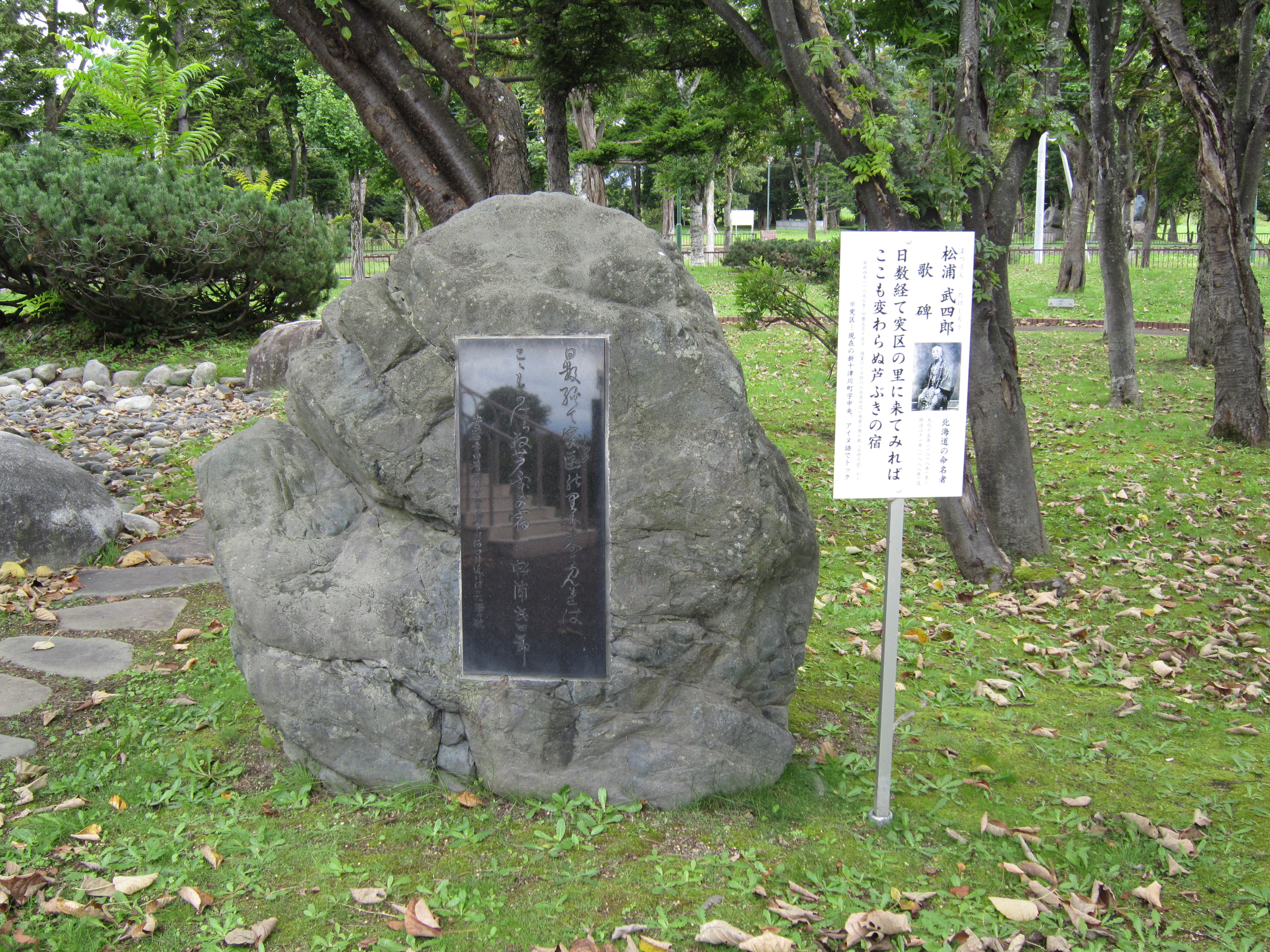
Inscribed tanka by Matsuura Takeshirō in Shintotsukawa

In 2018 a series of sixty-nine stelai inscribed with Matsuura Takeshirō's poems, markers denoting places he stayed, and other inscriptions and monuments in his honour was jointly designated Hokkaidō Heritage, an initiative aimed at valorization of the island's natural and cultural heritage, as Traces of Matsuura Takeshirō's Exploration of Ezo. These include:

- Atsuma: a stele in Tomisato (富里) erected in 1957 in relation to the hundredth anniversary of his two night stay in the vicinity in Ansei 5 (1858) (Municipal Tangible Cultural Property)
- Bifuka: the site where the name of the Teshio River (from the Ainu for a fishing weir) was recorded in Ansei 4 (1857) (Municipal Historic Site)
- Mashike: the site of his crossing the Nobusha River (信砂川) in Ansei 3 (1856) (Municipal Historic Site)
- Obira: a statue and inscribed poem in Nishin Culture and History Park (にしん文化歴史公園)
- Shari: an inscribed poem in Utoro
- Teshio: a statue and inscribed poem in Kagaminuma Seaside Park (鏡沼海浜公園); a marker of the place he stayed, referred to as Sakokaishi (サコカイシ), on the first night of his exploration of the Teshio River in Ansei 4 (1857), as recorded in his Teshio Diaries; a marker near where Japan National Route 40 crosses the Onoppunai River (雄信内川), commemorating his sleeping out on his second night, when he was plagued by mosquitoes at Onkanranma (オンカンランマ)
- Toyotomi: a marker where he stayed in Wakasanai, near the rest stop Sand Dune Station (砂丘の駅)

== Gallery ==
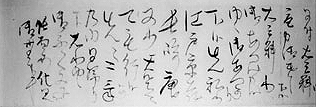
Letter sent by Matsuura Takeshirō shortly after setting out on his first journey in 1833

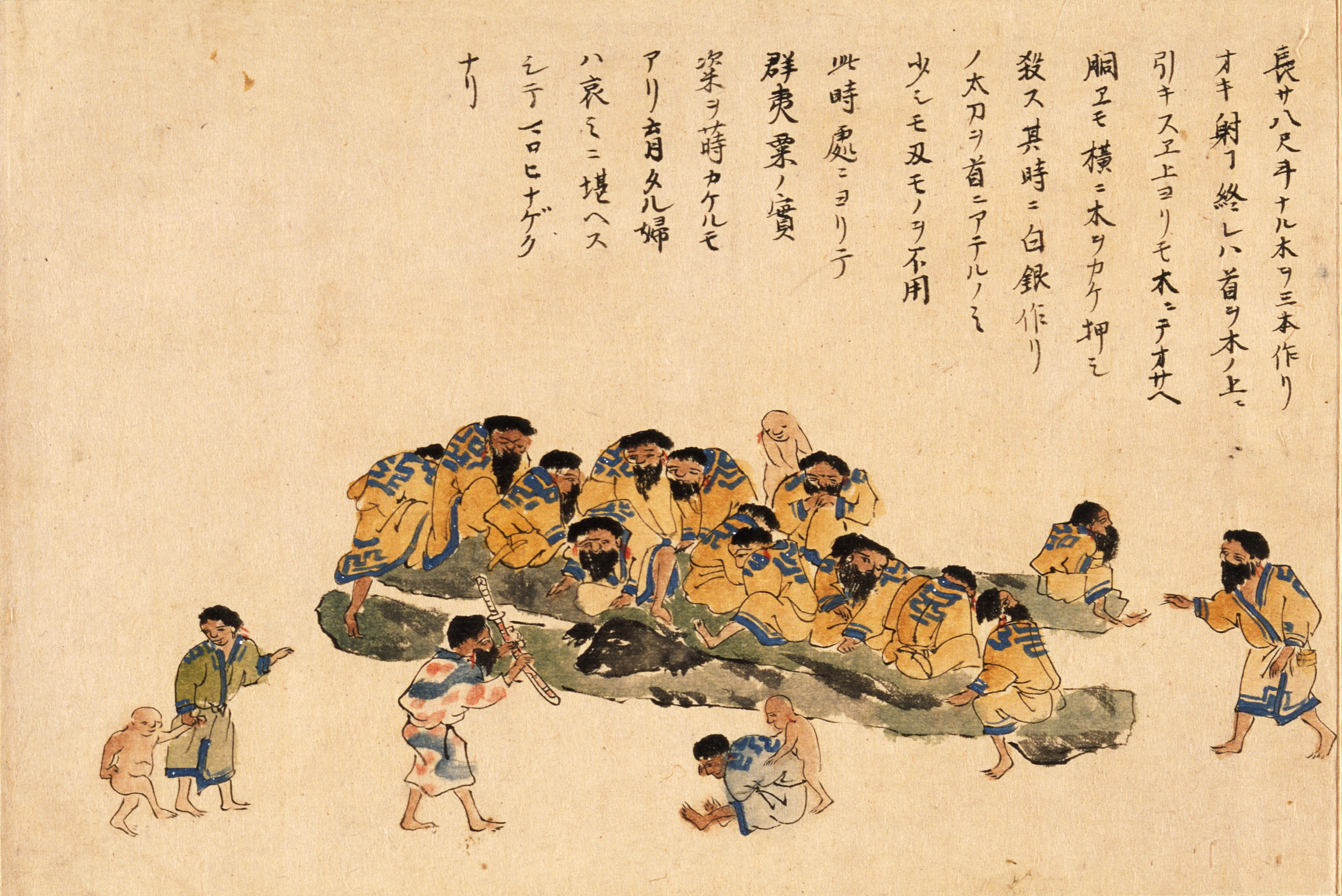
From the 1847 copy by Matsuura Takeshirō (Municipal Tangible Cultural Property) of Murakami Shimanojō's 1800 Curious Sights of the Island of Ezo (Hakodate City Central Library (ja))

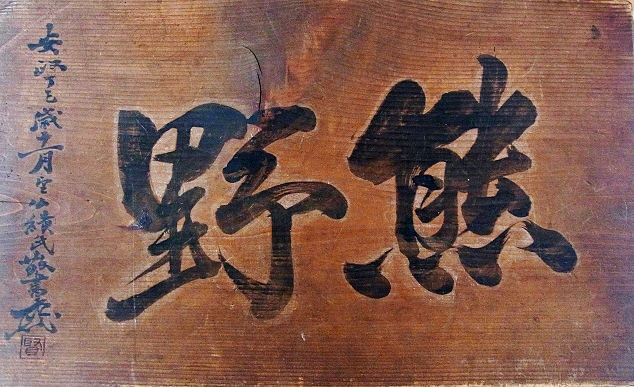
Hengaku or plaque with the shrine's name from Kumano Jinja in Iwanai (1857), calligraphy by Matsuura Takeshirō (Municipal Tangible Cultural Property)

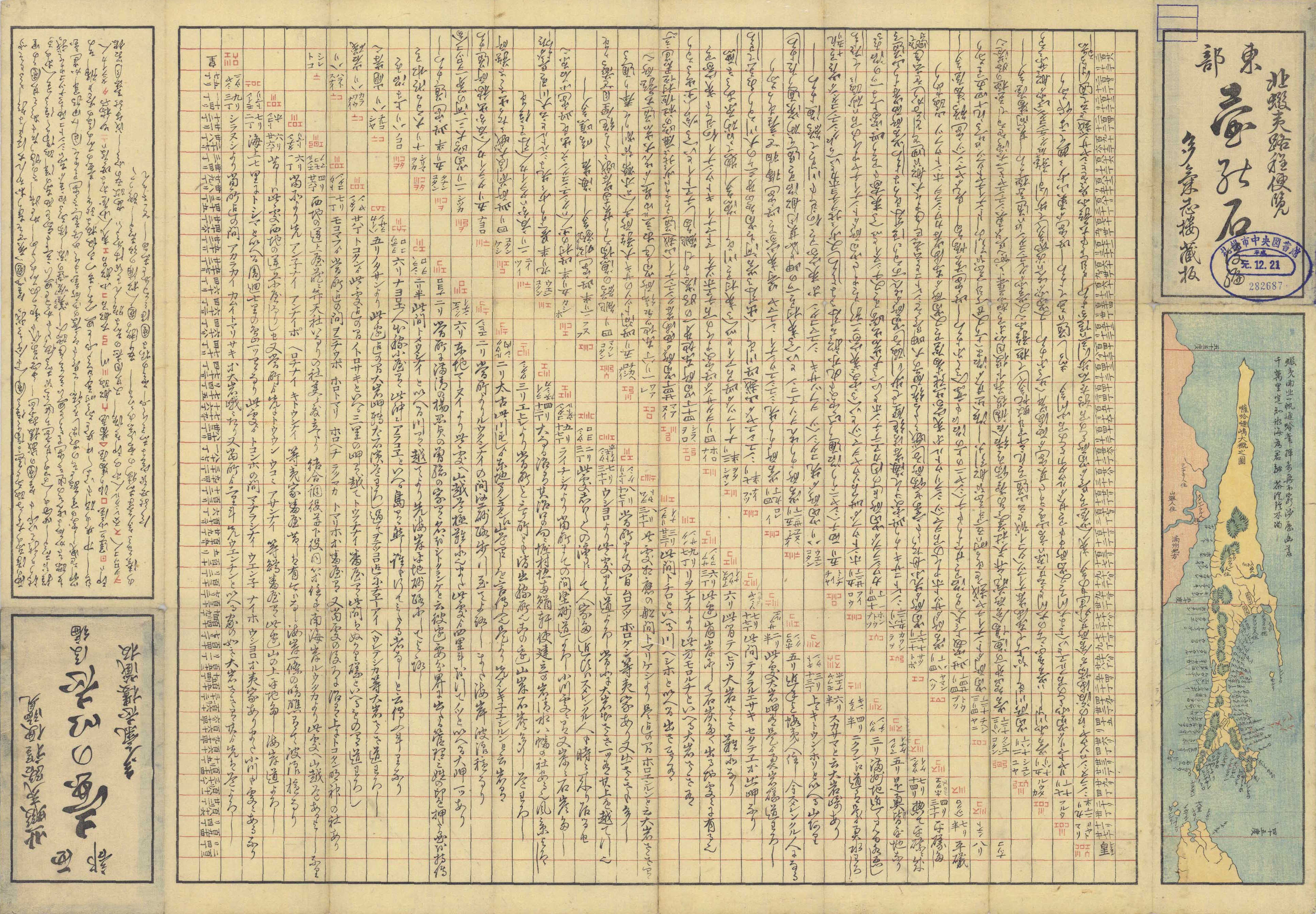
Tsubo no ishi (1858), a table of distances in Ezo compiled by Matsuura Takeshirō (Sapporo Municipal Central Library (ja))

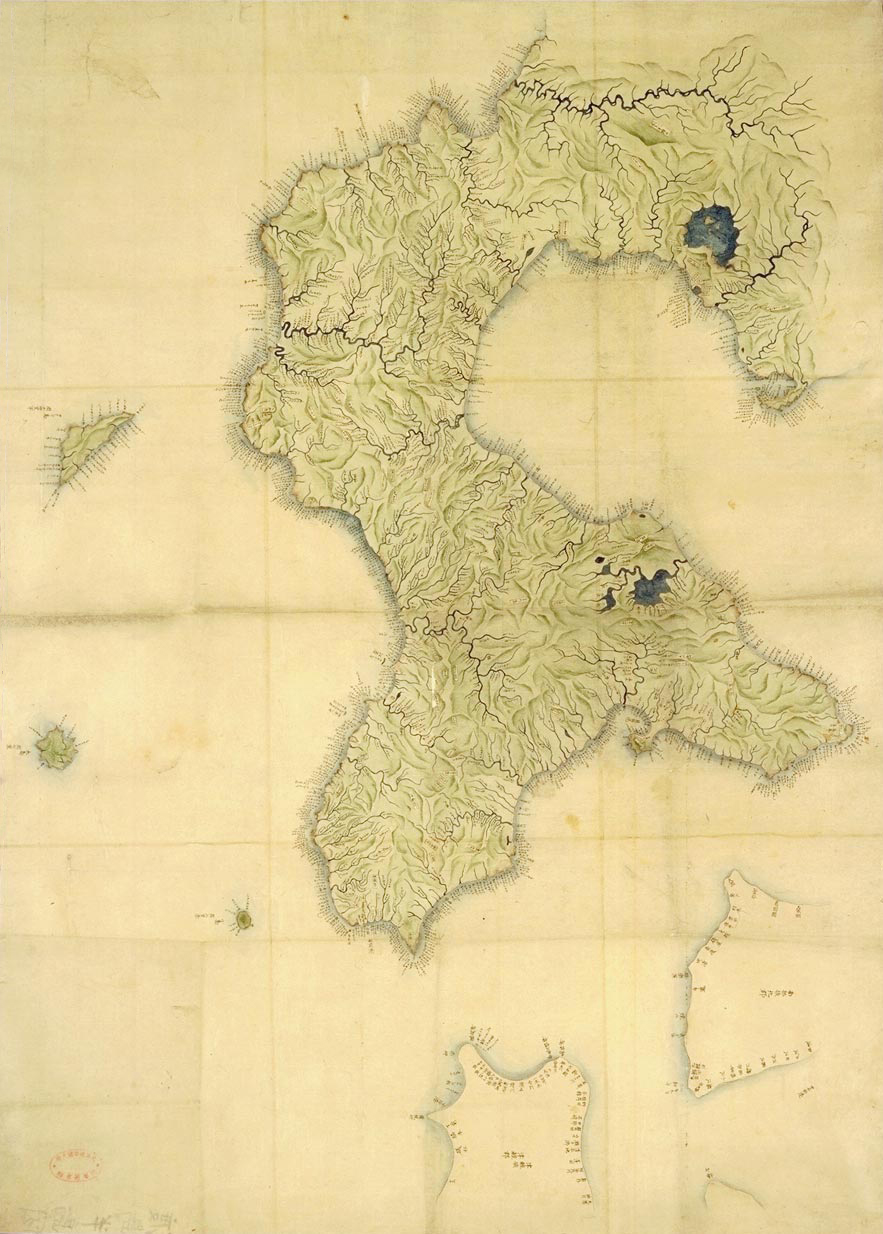
Map of the Oshima Peninsula (1859) by Matsuura Takeshirō (Hokkaido University Library)

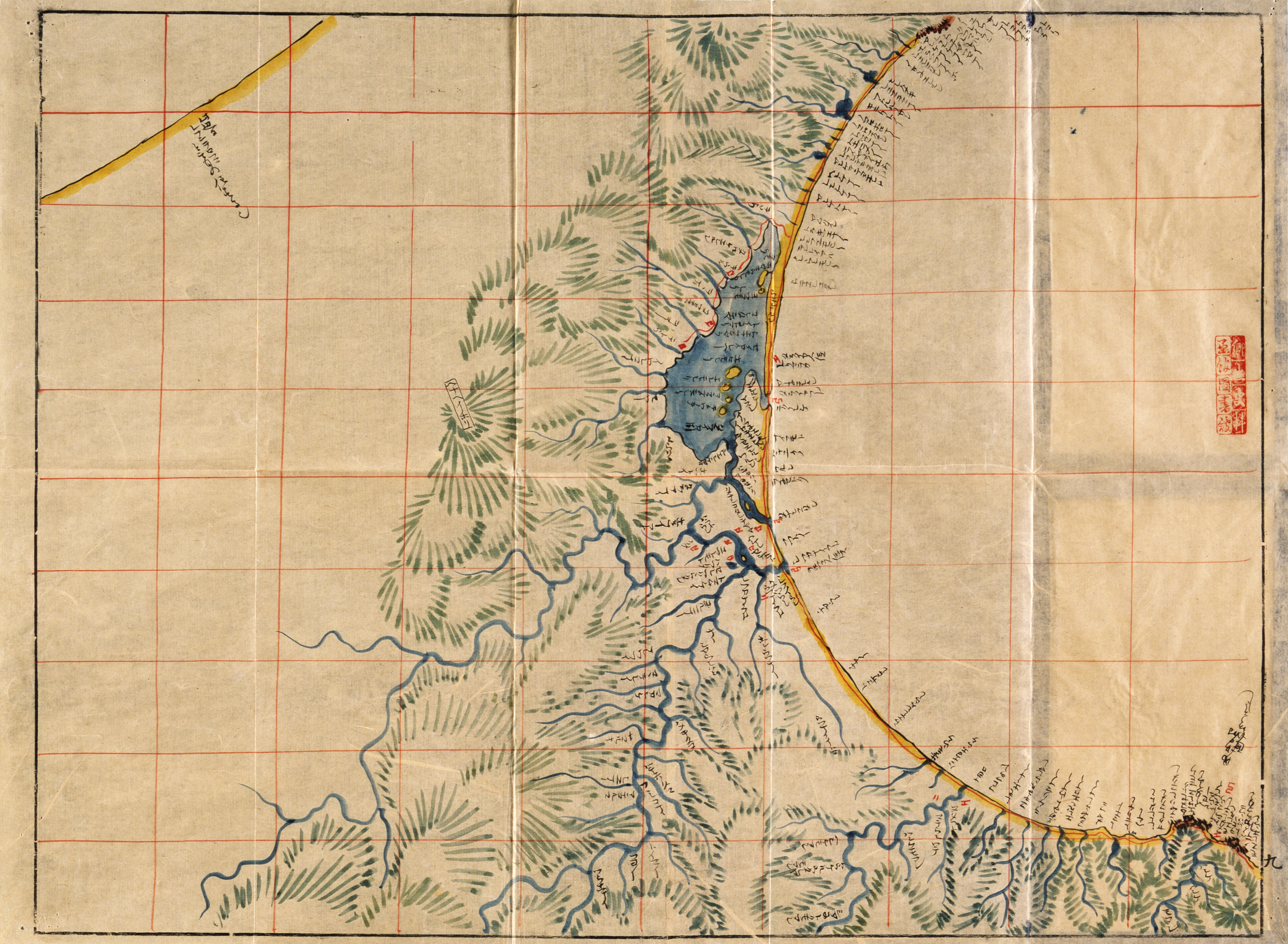
From Experimental Investigations into the Montane and Fluvial Geography of North Ezo (1860) by Matsuura Takeshirō (Hakodate City Central Library) (Municipal Tangible Cultural Property)

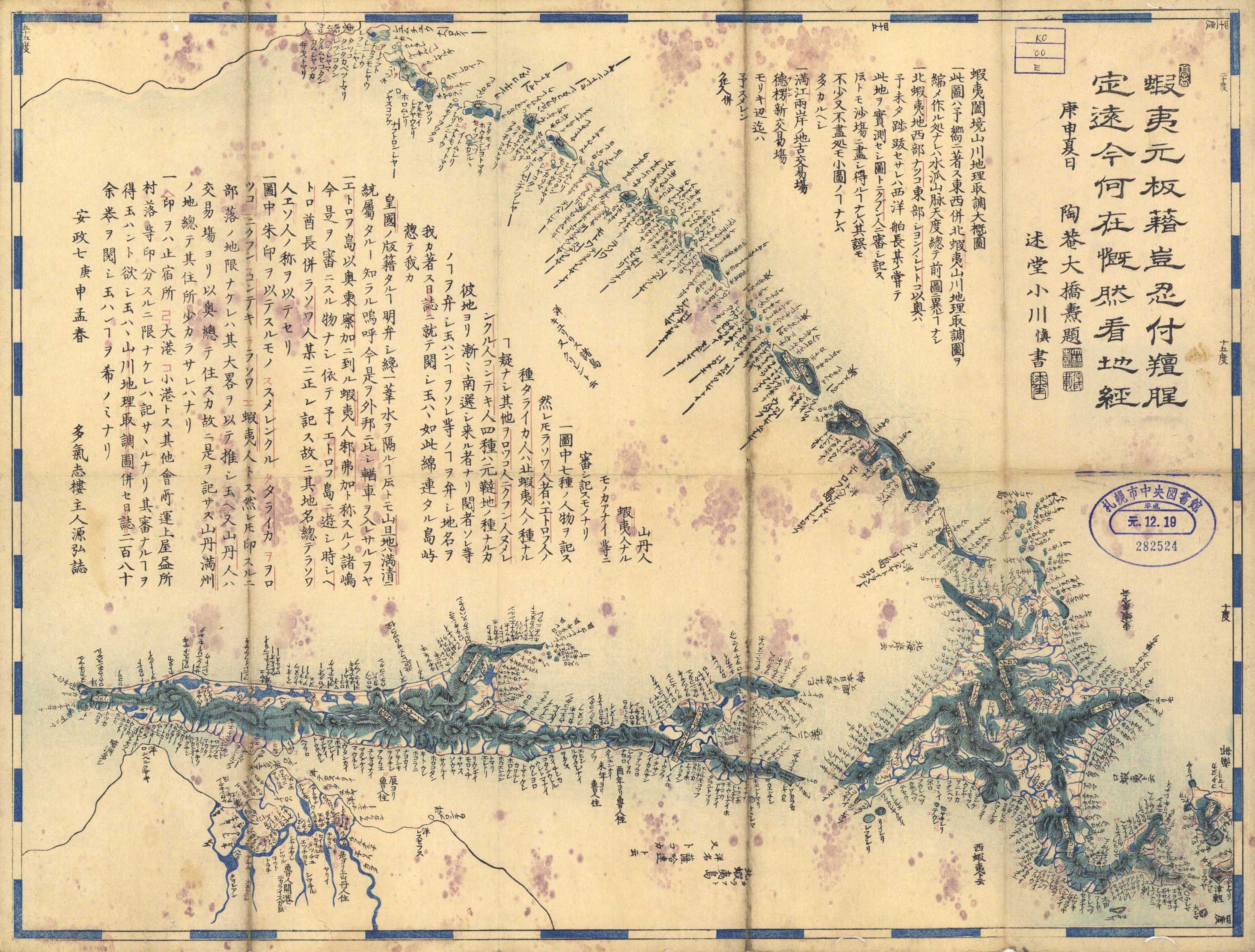
General Investigation into the Montane and Fluvial Geography of the Ezo Frontier (1860), by Matsuura Takeshiro (Sapporo Municipal Central Library)

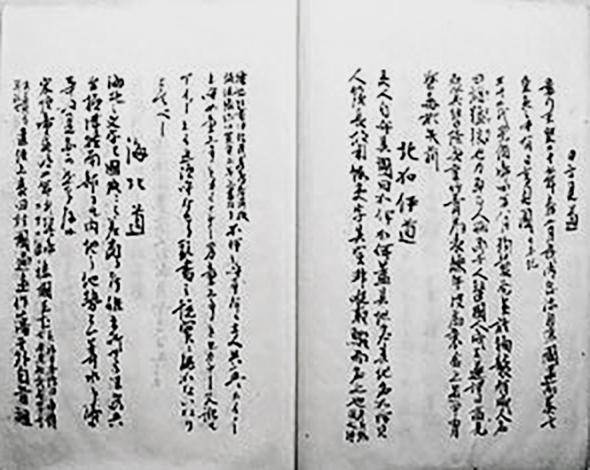
Report containing the proposals for the new name for Ezo put forward by Matsuura Takeshirō in 1869; "Hokkaidō" (北加伊道) may be seen indented towards the end of the right-hand page

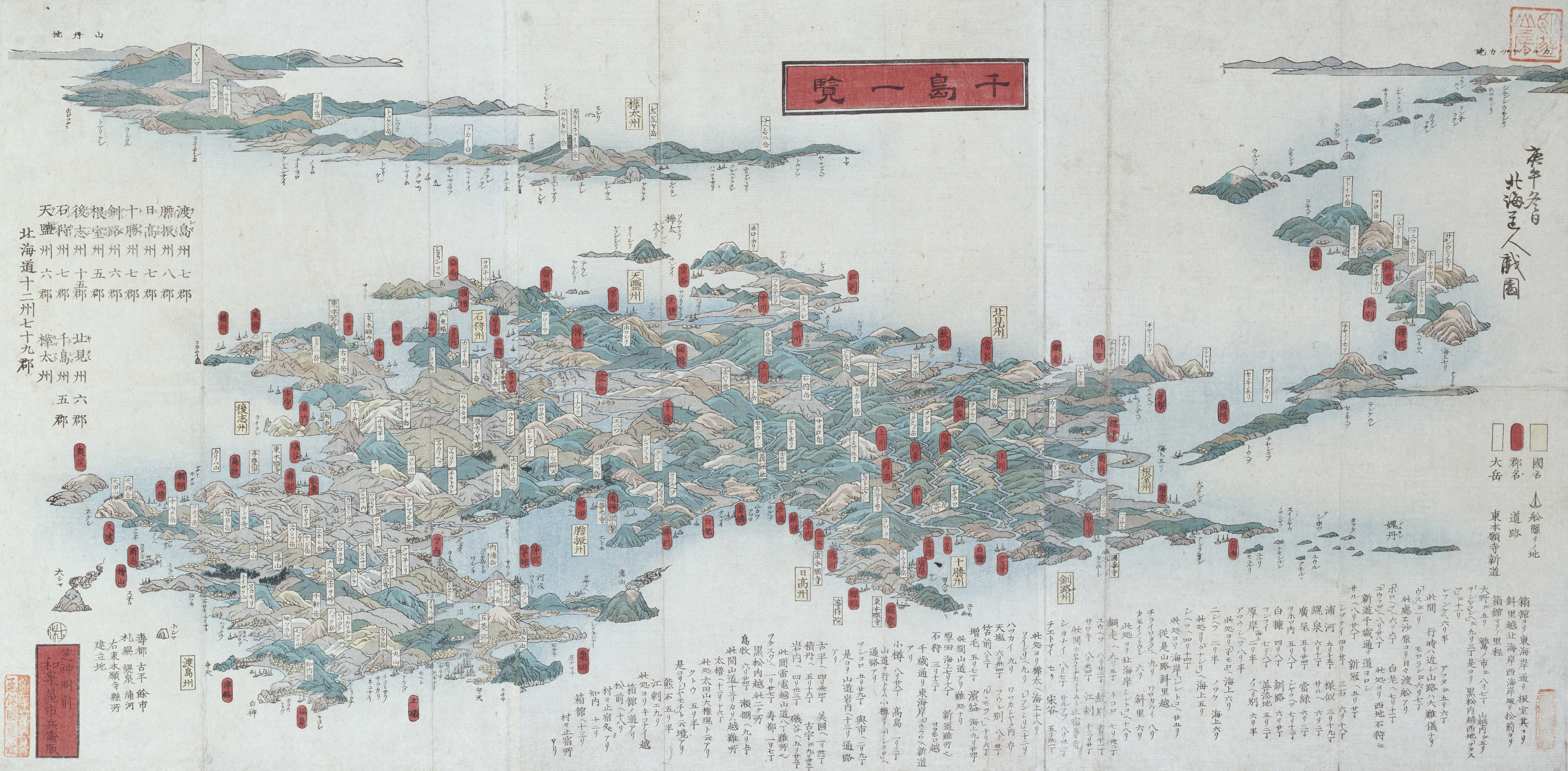
List of the Kuriles by Matsuura Takeshirō issued in 1870 (Hakodate City Central Library)

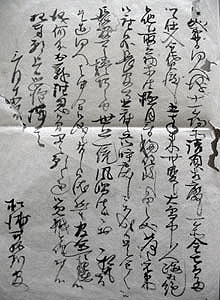
Copy in Matsuura Takeshirō's own hand of his letter of resignation from the Hokkaidō Development Commission in 1870

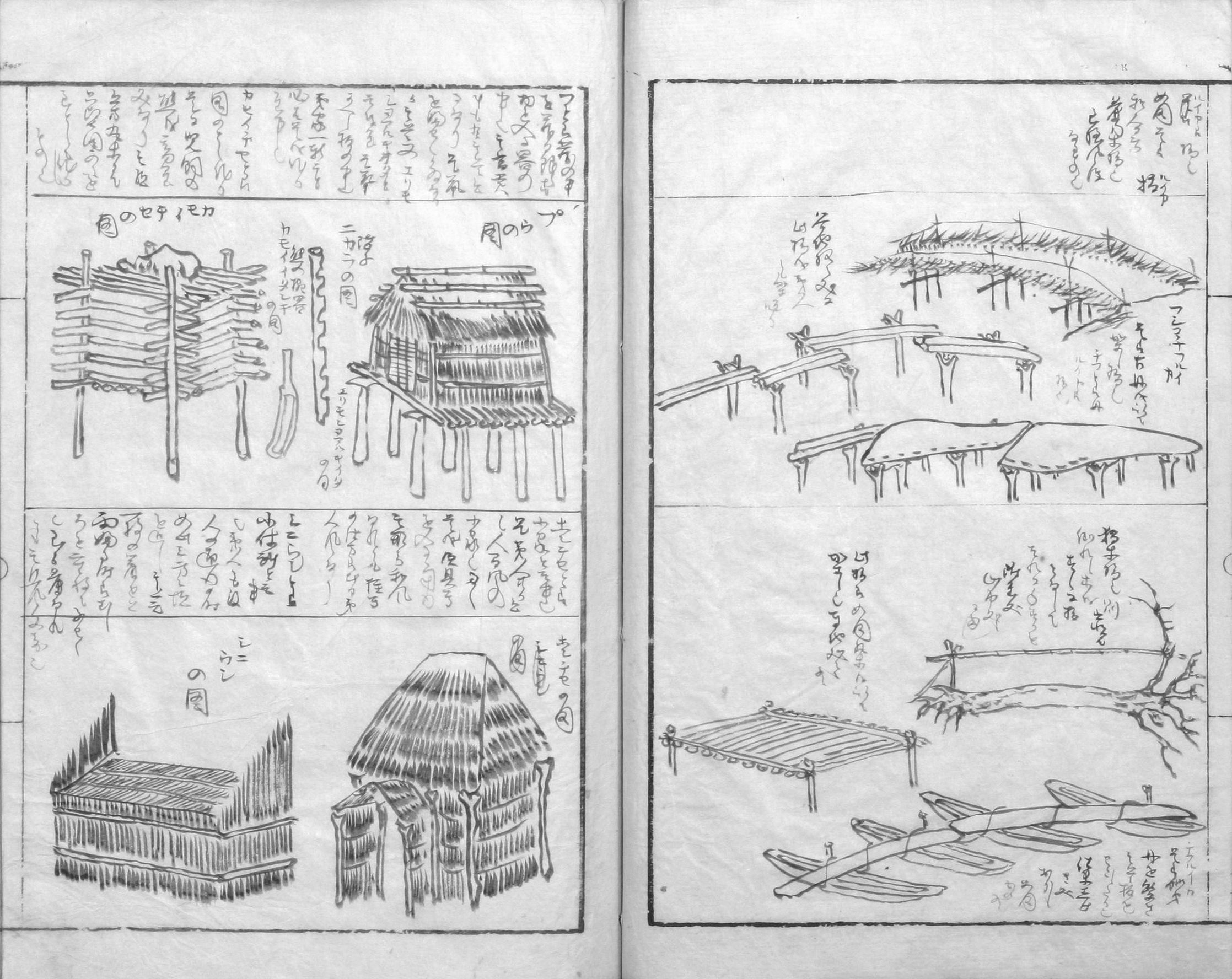
From Household Items of Ezo by Matsuura Takeshirō (Hakodate City Central Library) (Municipal Tangible Cultural Property)

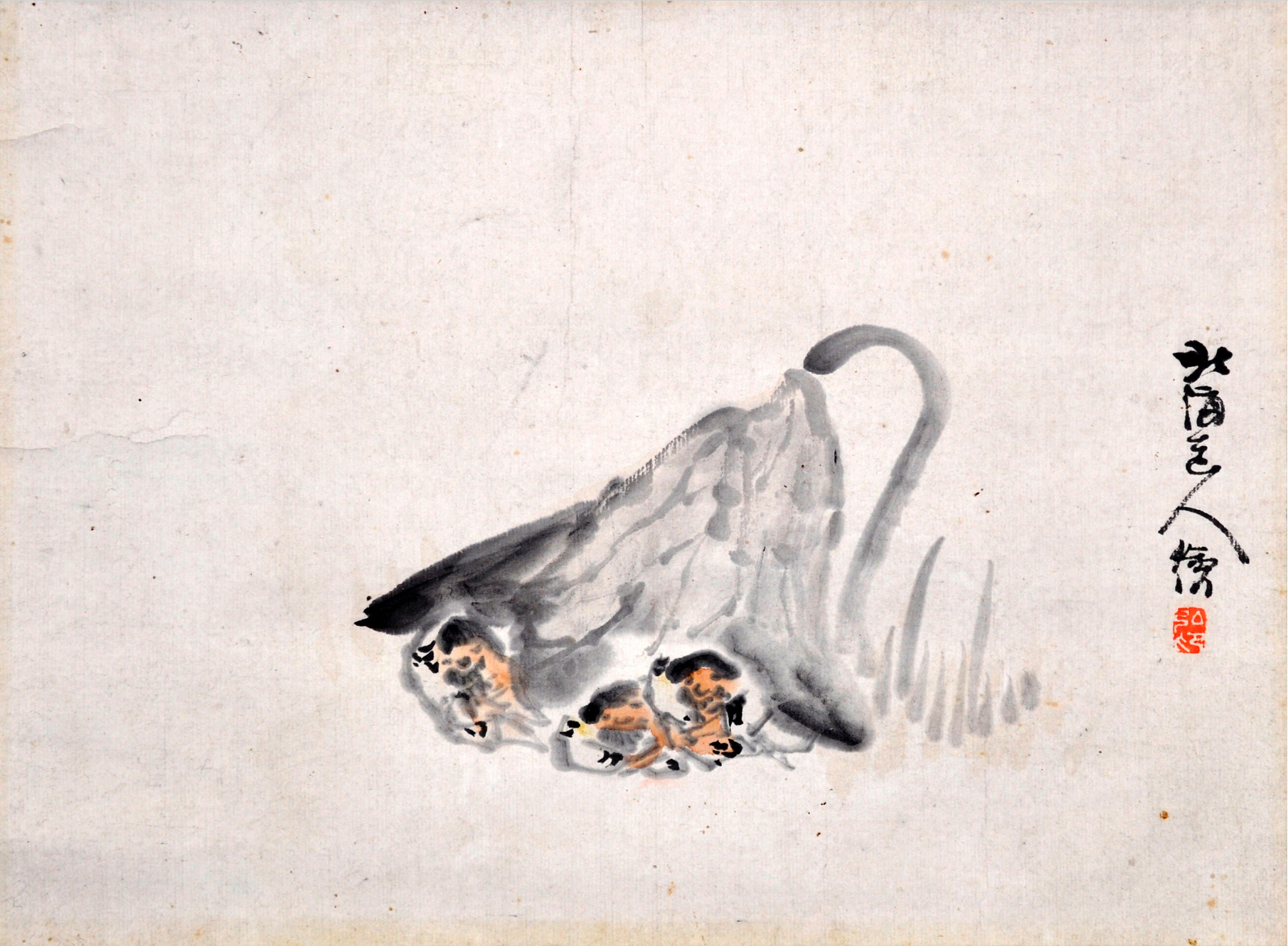
Koroppokuru Beneath a Butterbur, by Matsuura Takeshirō (Hakodate City Museum) (Municipal Tangible Cultural Property)

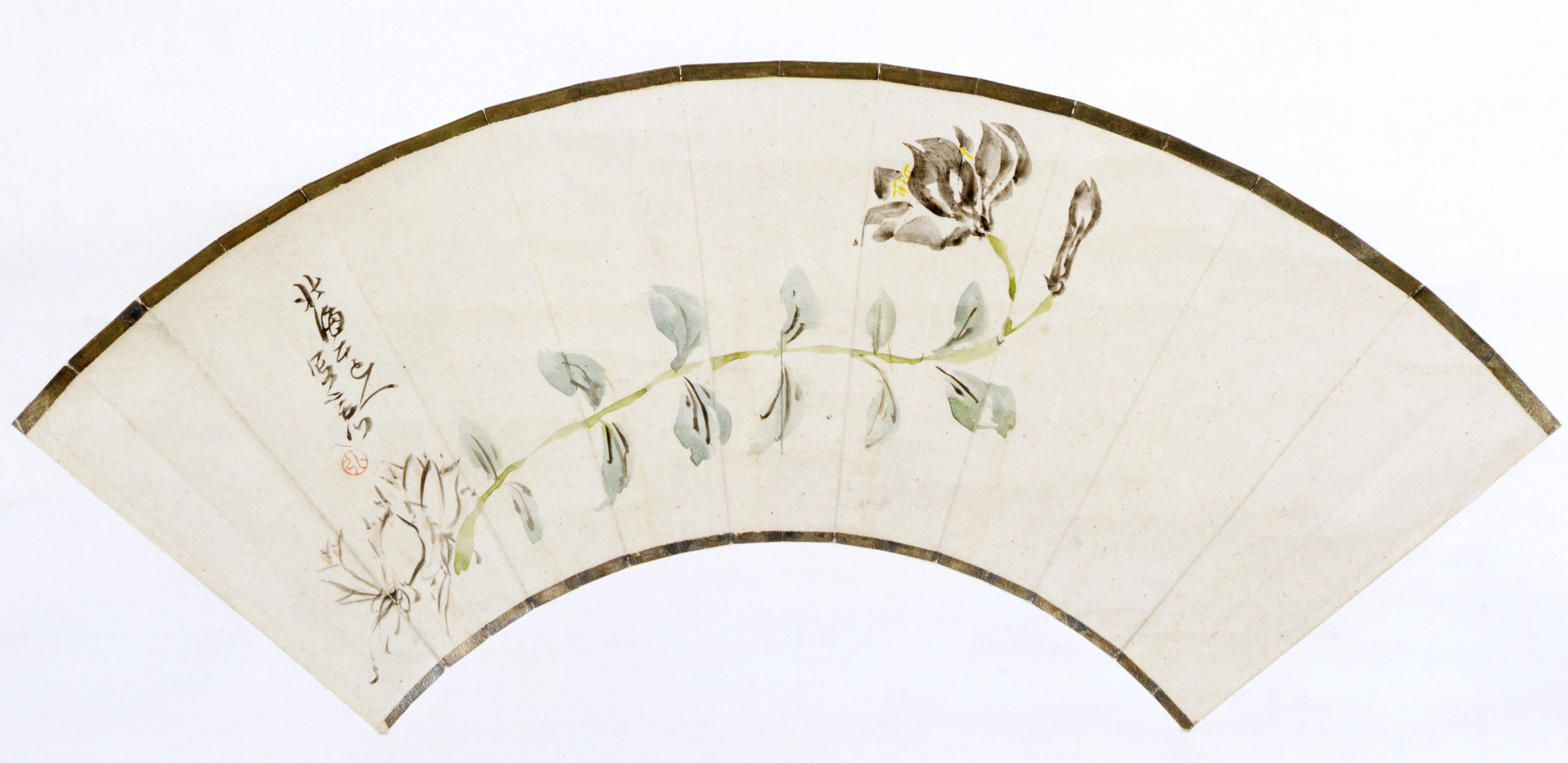
Kamchatka Lily, by Matsuura Takeshirō (Hakodate City Central Library) (Municipal Tangible Cultural Property)

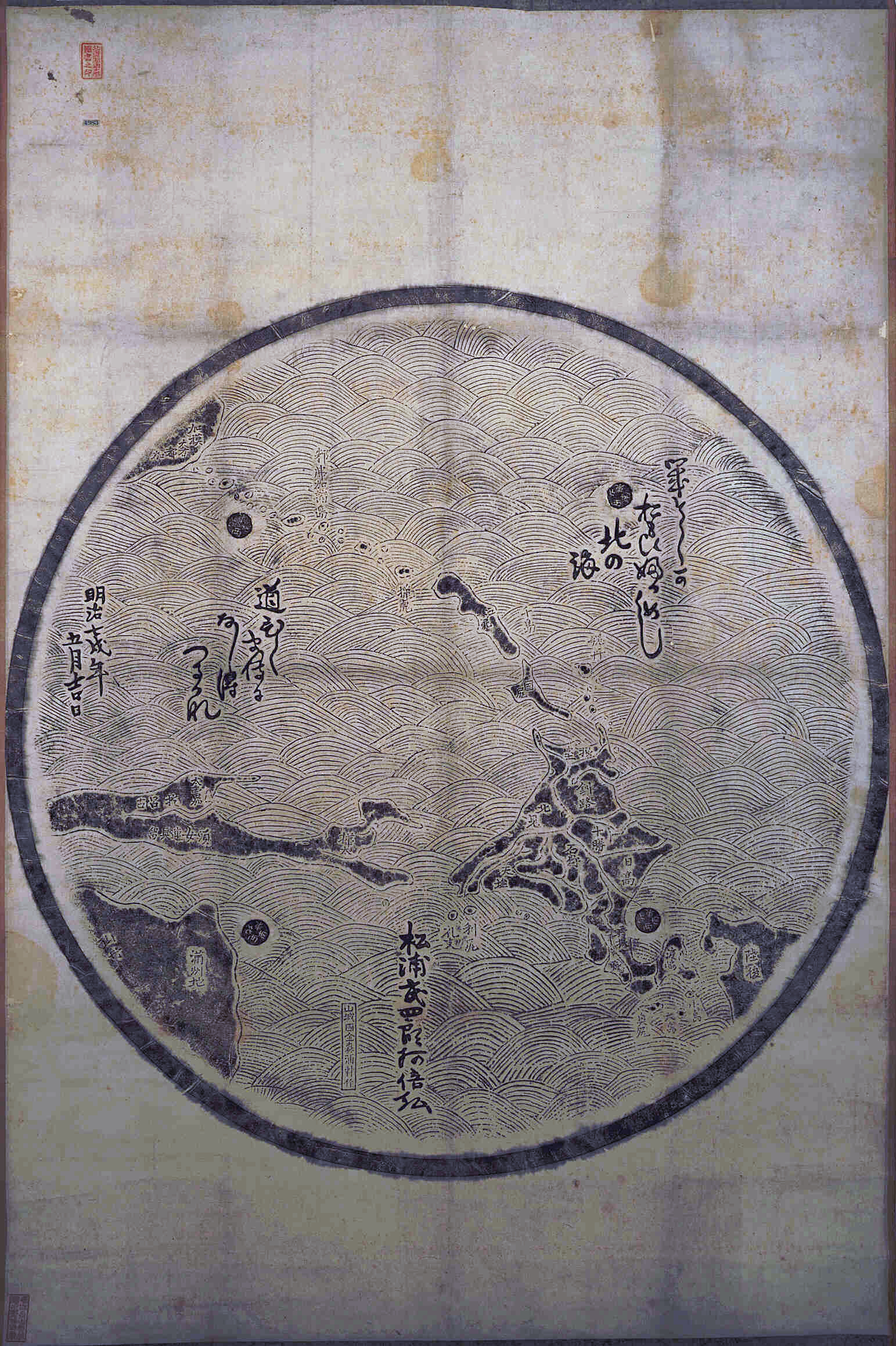
Rubbing of a mirror dedicated by Matsuura Takeshirō at Kitano Tenmangū depicting Hokkaidō and the islands of the northern seas

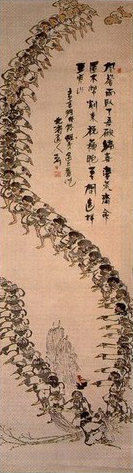
People of Ezo Worshipping a Distant Mountain in the Bitter Cold (1882), by Matsuura Takeshirō (Municipal Tangible Cultural Property)

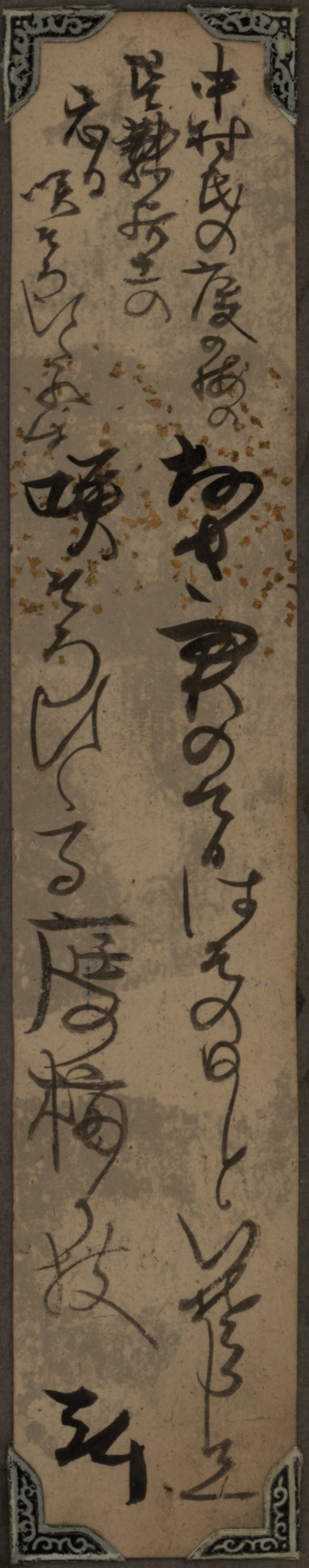
Tanzaku or poem card with calligraphy by Matsuura Takeshirō (Hakodate City Central Library) (Municipal Tangible Cultural Property)

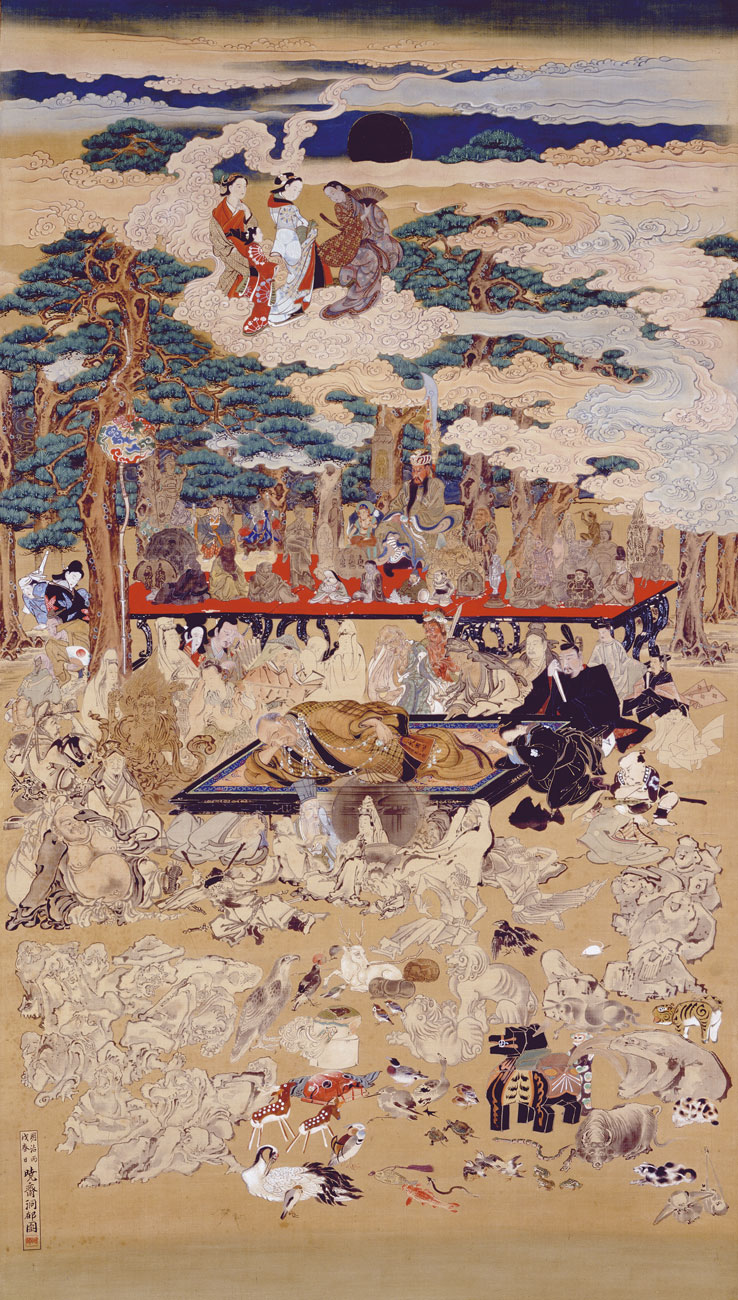
Hokkai Dōjin Taking a Nap Under the Trees (1886), by Kawanabe Kyōsai (Matsuura Takeshirō Memorial Museum)

== See also ==
- Hokkaido Museum
- Adam Laxman
- Ten Foot Square Hut
