= Matsumae Kinhiro =

Japanese daimyō

- 松前公広
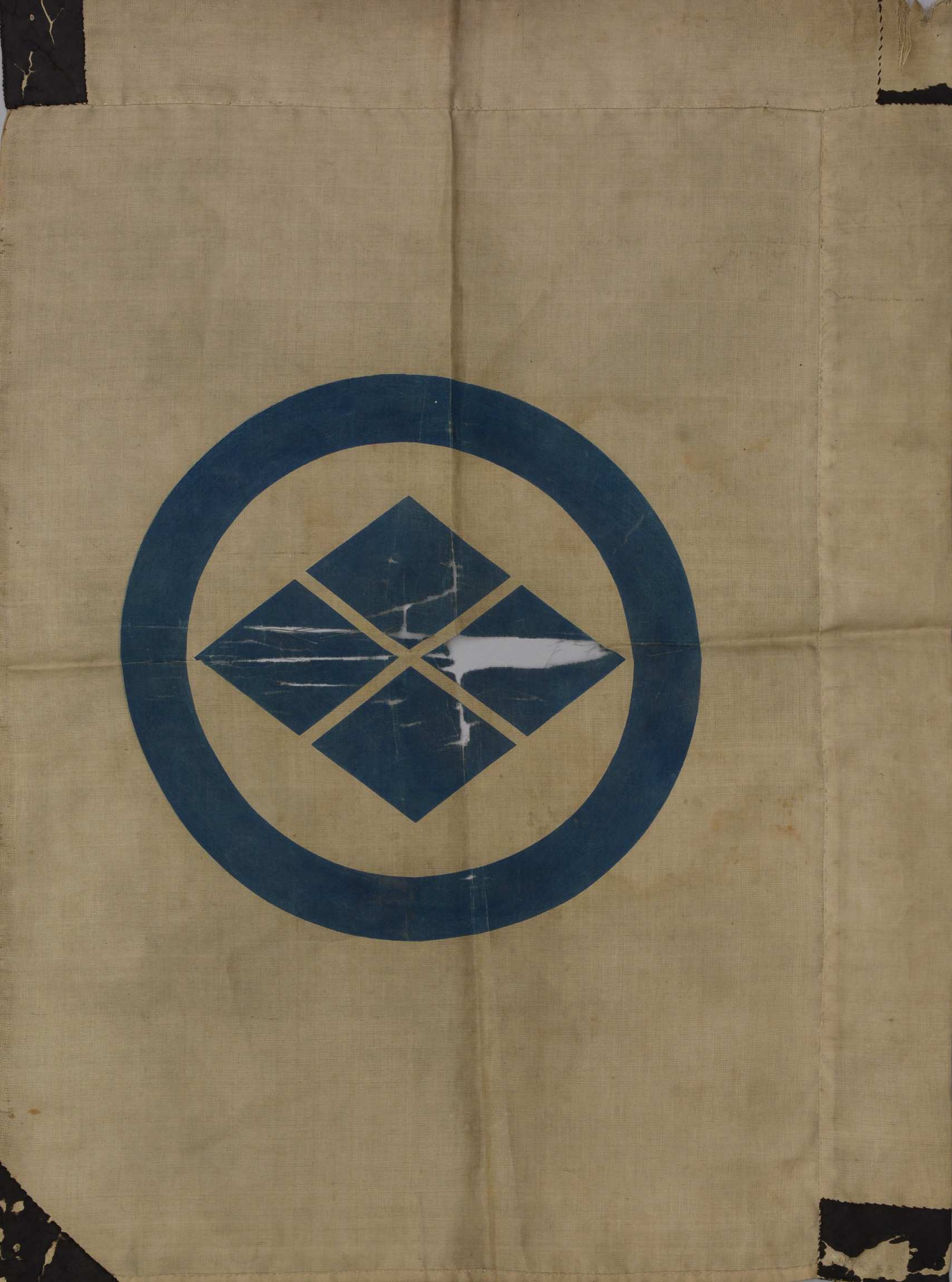
- Banner with the crest (mon) of the Matsumae clan, from the collection of Heinrich von Siebold (Weltmuseum Wien)

1st Daimyō of Matsumae Domain
- In office 1617–1641
- Monarchs: Shōgun: Tokugawa Hidetada; Tokugawa Iemitsu
- Preceded by: Matsumae Yoshihiro
- Succeeded by: Matsumae Ujihiro

Personal details
- Born: 1598
- Died: August 14, 1641 (aged 42–43)
- Children: Kanehiro (兼広); Ujihiro; Yasuhiro (泰広)
- Parent: Matsumae Morihiro (盛広) (father)
- Relatives: Matsumae clan

Matsumae Kinhiro (松前 公広; 1598 – August 14, 1641), was the second daimyō of Matsumae Domain in Ezo-chi, (Hokkaidō), Japan, in the early Edo period. Holding this position from 1617 until his death in 1641, he was successor to Matsumae Yoshihiro and followed by Matsumae Ujihiro.

== Names ==
His given name Kinhiro may also be read Kimihiro. In childhood he was known as Takematsumaru (竹松丸), later as Jingorō (甚五郎), and he also had the imina Shigehiro (茂広) and then Takehiro (武広).

== Biography ==
Kinhiro was born in Keichō 3 (1598) in Ōdate (大館), the Kakizaki, later the Matsumae, clan fortified residence in Matsumae before the construction of Fukuyama Castle. He was the eldest son of Matsumae Morihiro (松前盛広), the eldest son of Matsumae Yoshihiro, the first daimyō of Matsumae Domain, his mother the daughter of a clan retainer. His father died in Keichō 13 (1608). In Keichō 18 (1613), he received audiences with Tokugawa Hidetada and Tokugawa Ieyasu, and the following year was invested with Junior Fifth Court Rank, Lower Grade and the title Lord Protector of the Islands (志摩守). After the death of his grandfather Yoshihiro in 1616, Matsumae Kinhiro was confirmed as daimyō in Genna 2 (1617).

His years as daimyō saw the development of han finances, with the arrival of Ōmi merchants (近江商人), the establishment of a gold dust emporium, and the conferral of trading rights on his senior retainers. In 1617, prospectors using placer methods began to extract gold from local streams in the south of the Oshima Peninsula. In 1620, Kinhiro presented a hundred ryō of gold dust to the bakufu, Doi Toshikatsu and Aoyama Tadatoshi conferring rights to its continued gathering and to new gold mining operations on the island in return. These spread rapidly: by 1628, extraction activities had advanced to the Shiriuchi River (ja), by 1631 to Shimakomaki, then by 1633 to the Kenomai (慶能舞川) and Shizunai Rivers further east, and by 1635 to streams near Samani, as well as the Yūbari River. Kinhiro established a gold mining magistrate (金山奉行, kanayama bugyō) and leased rights to stretches of streams and rivers, the working methods being described in detail in a long surviving letter by Portuguese Jesuit missionary Diogo de Carvalho who, following in the footsteps of Jerome de Angelis, travelled to Ezo in 1620, and again in 1622.

These years were also marked by the development of the town below Matsumae Castle, extending down to the sea and supplanting the earlier centre to the north around Ōdate and the temple district. Kan'ei 10 (1633) saw the arrival of bakufu inspectors (巡見使, junkenshi) and the erection of distance markers every ri throughout the "land of the Wajin" (和人地, Wajin-chi). In the third month of 1637, the predecessor of today's Matsumae Castle went up in flames, with the loss of innumerable family treasures and documents, and Kinhiro himself hurt; it was rebuilt two years later.

Despite earlier tolerance, his final years brought persecution of Christianity, in line with the Shogunate's clampdown. Already in 1613, a Christian physician had been brought over to tend to an ailing lord, most likely Matsumae Yoshihiro. When Jerome de Angelis arrived in 1618, Kinhiro took no action, but after his departure he banned inhabitants of the domain from practising the faith. Turning a blind eye nevertheless to the large number of fleeing Kakure Kirishitan who came for refuge and to work in the gold-mining operations, in 1639 he complied more fully, executing one hundred and six, according to the official clan documents known as Fukuyama Hifu (福山秘府). Registers were compiled of current and former Christians, and attempts were made to persuade adherents to abandon their beliefs.

Kinhiro himself died on the eighth day of the seventh month of Kan'ei 18 (1641), at the age of 44 according to traditional age reckoning, after composing a death poem. He is buried at Hōdō-ji (法憧寺), in Matsumae, and was succeeded by his second son Ujihiro, his original heir Kanehiro having died at the age of ten in a smallpox outbreak that swept the island in 1624.

== See also ==
- Takeda Nobuhiro
- Shinra no Kiroku
- Kitamaebune
- Ichirizuka

Preceded by Matsumae Yoshihiro	Daimyō of Matsumae; 1617–1641	Succeeded by Matsumae Ujihiro
