= Twelve Garrisons of Southern Hokkaido =

Twelve Garrisons of Southern Hokkaido locations

The Twelve Garrisons of Southern Hokkaido (Japanese: 道南十二館, "Twelve Garrisons of the Southern Circuit") was a general term encompassing the Japanese feudal possessions in southern Ezo (now Hokkaido). The names come from the "Shinra no Kiroku" which describes the history of the Matsumae Domain. It is distributed along the southern coastline of the Oshima peninsula facing the Tsugaru Strait, from the Shimosa Garrison in Hakodate to Hanazawa Garrison in Kaminokuni. These garrisons were possessed by the Ando clan and were important sites for trade between Japanese merchants and the indigenous Ainu.

== List of garrisons ==
Name	Owner during Koshamain's War	Location	Building date
Usukeshi (宇須岸館)	Masamichi Kono	Hakodate City	~1450s
Mobetsu (茂別館)	Ando Iemasa	Hokuto City	1445
Nakano (中野館)	Kikinori Sato	Kikonai	1443
Wakimoto (脇本館)	Kisetsu Nanjo	Shiriuchi	
Innai (穏内館)	Kinnao Jindo	Fukushima	
Oyobe (覃部館)	Kitomo Imai	Matsumae	
Ōdate (大館)	Ando Sadasue	Matsumae	
Nebota (禰保田館)	Kisetsu Kondo	Matsumae	1400
Haraguchi (原口館)	Kisumi Okabe	Matsumae	
Hiishi (比石館)	Shigemasa Atsutani	Kaminokuni	
Hanazawa (花沢館)	Kiyoshi Sugisaki	Kaminokuni	
Shinoridate (志苔館)	Yoshikage Kobayashi	Hakodate City	1443

== History ==
In the middle of the 10th century, the Aonae culture, a creole between the Satsumon culture and the Haji pottery culture of Honshu, was established as the pre-stage of the establishment of the Ainu culture. The migration of Japanese to the Oshima Peninsula occurred from the end of the Kamakura period to the middle of the Muromachi period. From archaeological records, it is estimated that Japanese migration began in earnest after the late 14th century during the Muromachi period.

The Hokkaido Japanese then were under the control of the Ando clan. In 1454, Masaki Ando was chased by the Nanbu clan and moved to Hokkaido, where he assigned his generals to twelve garrisons: Ando Iemasa of Mobetsu garrison was to be the guardian of Lower Ezo, and Kiyoshi Sugisaki of Hanazawa garrison was to be guardian of Upper Ezo.

The garrisons came under serious threat during Koshamain's War: ten of the twelve garrisons were captured in 1457. However, in the following year, Koshamain was defeated by Nobuhiro Takeda's army.

In 1593, Matsumae Keihiro of the Oyazaki clan was appointed by Toyotomi Hideyoshi as the presiding lord of Ezo, leading the Ando clan to gradually lose control of Ezo.

After that, the Hokkaido Japanese established the Matsumae Domain, and the twelve garrisons fell out of use and became abandoned.
