= Ghost of Yōtei =

2025 video game

- Developer: Sucker Punch Productions
- Publisher: Sony Interactive Entertainment
- Directors: Nate Fox; Jason Connell
- Producer: Brian Fleming
- Artist: Joanna Wang
- Writers: Ian Ryan; John Dombrow; Li Kuo; Ariadna Martinez; Courtney Woods
- Composer: Toma Otowa
- Platform: PlayStation 5
- Release: October 2, 2025
- Genre: Action-adventure
- Modes: Single-player, multiplayer

Ghost of Yōtei is a 2025 action-adventure game developed by Sucker Punch Productions and published by Sony Interactive Entertainment. It is a standalone sequel to the 2020 game Ghost of Tsushima. Set in 1603 in Ezo, Japan, the story follows Atsu, a mercenary seeking vengeance against the "Yōtei Six" for slaughtering her family sixteen years prior.

Ghost of Yōtei was released for the PlayStation 5 on October 2, 2025. It received generally positive reviews and sold over 3.3 million copies by November 2025. The game won "Adventure Game of the Year" at the 29th Annual D.I.C.E. Awards. A multiplayer mode titled Ghost of Yōtei: Legends was released in March 2026, and the game's Complete Edition, featuring new DLC, in the form of both Legends, a single-player narrative-expansion titled Echoes of Sekigahara, and a survival mode titled "Most Wanted", was released on October 1, 2026.

== Gameplay ==
Ghost of Yōtei introduces several new weapons, including the yari (spear).

Ghost of Yōtei is played in the third-person perspective, and features elements of combat, stealth, and open-world exploration. As Atsu, the player is free to explore various regions of Ezo, each with its own series of locations to visit, allies to recruit, and enemies to fight.

=== Combat ===
As the player progresses through the story, they unlock an arsenal of melee, ranged, and throwable weapons, expanding upon the selection available in Tsushima. The "stance" system has been replaced by a "weapon counter system"; unlocking new weapons gives the player more options to counter various enemy archetypes. Atsu begins with a single katana, and as the game progresses, she unlocks the yari (spear), kusarigama (chain-sickle), ōdachi (two-handed greatsword), and will also be able to dual-wield katana. The hankyu and yumi bows return from Tsushima, and Atsu can also gain access to a tanegashima (matchlock rifle) and a tanzutsu (matchlock pistol).

Returning elements from Tsushima's gameplay are combination attacks (that must be parried), and unblockable attacks (that must be evaded). New features include disarming attacks that can cause Atsu or her enemies to drop their weapons, and the ability to pick up and throw dropped weapons at foes. Atsu can use a resource called "Spirit" which functions similarly to "Resolve" from the first game, using it to heal herself or perform powerful moves in combat. Throughout the game, Atsu befriends a wild wolf, which she can summon to aid her in combat or stealth encounters.

=== Environments and Exploration ===
Ghost of Yōtei's environments have been updated with dynamic weather effects inspired by the real climate around Mount Yōtei, including snow, rain, and aurora borealis. The game is divided into several unique biomes, each with their own characteristics and enemy archetypes. For example, Teshio Ridge in the north of the map is dominated by the Kitsune and the Nine-Tails shinobi clan, and its freezing temperatures will reduce Atsu's maximum health. Oshima Coast in the south is dominated by the best-equipped of Lord Saito's forces, with many of them wielding firearms.

Unlike in Tsushima, Atsu is able to use the grappling hook from the beginning of the game, and will frequently use it to climb up and down from steep ledges and swing along treacherous paths.

Atsu has the ability to set up a camp almost anywhere on the map, allowing her to regain health and spirit, cook meals for stat boosts, craft ammunition, and interact with vendors to trade resources and equipment. Side activities allow the player to improve their statistics; returning from Tsushima, players can bathe in onsen (hot springs), cut bamboo, and follow foxes and trek steep mountain paths to find charms and altars to learn new skills.

New side activities include sumi-e painting (replacing Tsushima's haiku composition), gambling by playing zeni hajiki, and learning new songs on the shamisen. The "guiding wind" also returns to direct Atsu to objectives, and its target can be changed by playing the shamisen.

=== Storyline ===
The game is open-world, and allows the player to explore the various regions at their own pace on their quest to defeat the Yōtei Six (with the exception of the Snake and Lord Saito's family, who are fought as the first and final bosses respectively).

Players can take on side-quests for NPCs for money, rewards, or cosmetic items. New activities include "Bounties", which can be found in each region of the map. Atsu can pursue these quests to defeat especially powerful enemies in exchange for money and cosmetic items. In order to get stronger, Atsu's quest will also lead her to master the various weapons and acquire new equipment, culminating in her final battle against Lord Saito.

Kurosawa Mode returns to Ghost of Yōtei, based on the black-and-white films of Akira Kurosawa. Two additional modes, inspired by the works of Takashi Miike and Shinichirō Watanabe, are also available in the game.

=== Multiplayer ===
A sequel to Tsushima's co-op multiplayer Legends mode was announced, titled Ghost of Yōtei: Legends. Like its previous entry, it will feature two-player story missions and four-player survival matches where players will fight against gigantic, monstrous versions of the Yōtei Six and enemies inspired by Japanese mythology. Yōtei: Legends released on March 10, 2026 as a free update for all base game owners.

=== Downloadable Content ===
As part of the game's one year anniversary, Sucker Punch studios announced a re-release of the game. Titled Ghost of Yōtei: Complete Edition, the game includes all previously released content, as well as a new narrative expansion, Echoes of Sekigahara, and a new single-player combat survival mode, Most Wanted. Players who already owned the game at launch could upgrade to the Complete Edition for a reduced cost.

Echoes of Sekigahara is set as part of the game's main story, before Atsu confronts Lord Saito, and explores some of the events prior to her returning to Ezo to exact her revenge, and the consequences of her quest. In addition to a previously unseen region being added to the main game, the expansion includes new enemy archetypes, skills, and armor sets with unique perks. Meanwhile, Most Wanted is a rogue-like combat survival mode, in which players can take on waves of enemies that culminate in a boss fight against a member of the Yōtei Six. Players can play as Atsu, Oyuki, new character Nagato (who appears in the Echoes of Sekigahara narrative), and Jin Sakai, the player character and protagonist of Ghost of Tsushima.

Besides the paid content, Sucker Punch also released the Beauty of Yōtei mode, a purely visual mode which allows for more opportunities for players to take in-game photos of Ezo's environment, and new tracks for Watanabe Mode, as a free update.

Ghost of Yōtei: Complete Edition was launched on October 1, 2026 globally, and on October 2 in Asia, Australia and New Zealand.

== Synopsis ==
=== Premise ===
The story is set in the environs of Mount Yōtei in Ezo (modern-day Hokkaido, Japan) in 1603, 329 years after the events of Tsushima. The main character, Atsu (Erika Ishii / Fairouz Ai), is a wandering mercenary who adopts the persona of the vengeful onryō in her quest to hunt down the "Yōtei Six" – renegade samurai Lord Nariaki Saito (Feodor Chin / Miou Tanaka) and his lieutenants the Snake/Yukiharu (Nelson Lee / Mutsumi Sasaki), the Oni/Lord Hyozo (Tommy Kang / Atsushi Miyauchi), the Kitsune/Dojun (Matthew Yang King / Jun Fukuyama), and Saito's sons, the Spider/Sakichi (Robert Wu / Tomokazu Sugita) and the Dragon/Ukichi (David Sakurai / Tomokazu Seki) – who, sixteen years prior, had slaughtered her family, destroyed her home, and left her for dead, pinned against a burning ginkgo tree with her father's katana.

Supporting characters allied with Atsu – referred to as her "Wolf Pack" – include Oyuki (Jeannie Bolet / Romi Park), a traveling shamisen performer and former Yōtei Six member; Jubei (Noshir Dalal / Shogo Nakamura), Atsu's twin brother and a Matsumae clan samurai who goes by the title Lord Kitamori; and Kiku (Suzie Yeung / Shion Wakayama), Jubei's teenage daughter.

=== Plot ===
In 1587, after her family is killed, a young girl named Atsu is left for dead by a band of outlaws known as the Yōtei Six, led by the renegade samurai lord Nariaki Saito, in an event later called the Night of the Burning Tree. Atsu survives and flees Ezo, becoming a wandering mercenary for the next sixteen years before returning home to exact revenge against the Yōtei Six. She first finds the Snake drunk in a backwater village and kills him, but is seriously wounded in the process. Atsu miraculously survives and recovers from her injury, causing witnesses to fearfully dub her the "onryō". Saito puts a bounty on her head.

Returning to her family home, Atsu begins her hunt for the remaining Yōtei Six. She learns that Saito is recruiting soldiers to claim the entire island of Ezo for himself, as the self-appointed "Shogun of the North"; the Matsumae clan, who are loyal to the Shogun, have declared war against Saito. Atsu travels around Yōtei, killing Saito's forces, assisting locals, and training under various weapon masters. As Atsu's reputation grows, many rōnin attempt to claim her bounty, and Atsu gains new allies who aid her, known as the "Wolf Pack".

After learning how to dual wield katana from Hanbei, formerly Ezo's best bounty hunter and an old friend of her father, Atsu attempts to assassinate Saito at his training camp, but fails. Surprised she is alive, he challenges her to a duel, which is interrupted when the Matsumae attack the stronghold; Hanbei manages to save her and encourages her to stop chasing her vendetta, while Saito escapes.

While pursuing the Oni in Ishikari Plain, Atsu discovers her brother Jubei also survived the massacre and was rescued by the Matsumae clan, rising in rank to become the samurai officer Lord Kitamori. Atsu and Jubei infiltrate the Oni’s stronghold, Ishikari Castle, to assassinate him, but their attempt is unsuccessful, and the two flee. Jubei struggles to reconcile his love for his sister and his duty to the Matsumae, coupled with her recklessness and disregard for the lives of the prisoners taken by the Oni, and he leaves her behind in frustration before returning to his men. Atsu heads to a Matsumae camp to obtain information from a former Oni Raider named Mad Goro, but the Oni's forces arrive and slaughter the samurai. The siblings reconcile and learn of a secret passage into the castle. They infiltrate, incite a prisoner rebellion, and slay the Oni together, and Atsu helps burn down the castle.

After narrowly surviving an ambush in Teshio Ridge, Atsu assists the traveling shamisen performer Oyuki to track down the Kitsune and thwart his production of wolfsbane poison at his fortress. When the Kitsune fails to recognize her, Atsu deduces that Oyuki was the original Kitsune; Oyuki admits she was formerly the Kitsune who served as Saito's shinobi, who saved Atsu and let her escape after Saito hanged Atsu's mother. Disillusioned by the Night of the Burning Tree, Oyuki planned to betray him, but was herself betrayed and replaced as the Kitsune by her disciple, Dojun, with Saito branding her as punishment. After a duel, Atsu forgives Oyuki, who teaches her shinobi techniques, gives her the antidote to Dojun's toxin, and helps her to kill him.

As Atsu and Jubei reunite at home, Jubei meets Oyuki and nearly attacks her in anger when she reveals she was the Kitsune, before she informs the siblings that Saito and his sons, the Dragon and the Spider, are planning to attack the Matsumae heartland, shocked to discover that Saito has an entire fleet of warships. After breaking through enemy lines, Jubei saves a teenager from execution, revealing she is his daughter, Kiku. While Jubei takes her to the safety of Matsumae Castle, Atsu and Oyuki search for Saito's sons. With the Dragon proving too cautious after Atsu and Jubei attempt to kill him at the lighthouse, Atsu captures his younger brother, the Spider, as he re-enacts the Night of the Burning Tree as a play; enraged, she massacres the Saito forces, but stops at killing the Spider, and Oyuki takes him to Matsumae Castle. The Matsumae organize his public execution to lure out the Dragon, with the Spider mentioning his clan's burial grounds in Tokachi Range, but they are outmaneuvered by a Saito counterattack on the castle and distracted by Saito's ships. Jubei and Oyuki leave to defend the castle and save Kiku, imploring Atsu to help, but she stays to kill the Dragon; as the castle is destroyed, Jubei and Oyuki end up missing, despite Atsu fighting through Saito's men to reach them. After killing his way through the samurai to escape, the Spider recovers the Dragon's body, but Saito disowns him in frustration as punishment for letting his brother die.

Finding Kiku safe at a nearby temple, Atsu evacuates her to her family home and begins to have doubts about her grudge when Kiku similarly becomes obsessed with revenge and lambasts her for abandoning Jubei and Oyuki to kill the Dragon, going to Hanbei for help. At Saito's clan cemetery, she tracks down the Spider, who reveals Jubei and Oyuki were captured by Saito, and tells her that he lost his infant sister after Atsu's father betrayed Saito. Following a duel that leads Atsu to spare the Spider, he offers to lead her to his father's castle, before leaving Ezo for the mainland. Atsu rescues Jubei and Oyuki and learns Saito is waiting for her at her family home with Kiku as his hostage. Together, Atsu and Jubei duel Saito, but Jubei is mortally wounded. Atsu manages to disarm Saito and pin him to her family ginkgo tree with both of their swords, and when he begs her to kill him, she leaves him to bleed out, promising to Jubei that she will raise Kiku in his stead before Jubei dies of his wounds; when Atsu sees Kiku as her younger self, she embraces her as they mourn Jubei's death. Having finally found closure and something to live for instead of revenge, she retires the onryō role to live a quiet, peaceful life as Kiku's guardian.

==== Echoes of Sekigahara ====
Atsu learns of a new bounty for "Nagato the Handsome", whom she recognizes. Travelling to the Ashoro Foothills in eastern Ezo, Atsu discovers that it has been overrun by the Vipers, a faction who once served under the Snake. With his death at Atsu's hands, his followers have begun fighting among themselves while vying for Lord Saito's favor to become a new member of the Yōtei Six.

Atsu reunites with Nagato, albeit on uneasy terms. It is revealed that three years prior to the events of the game, Nagato was a commander for the Western Army at the Battle of Sekigahara, and Atsu had been hired as an ashigaru. The two also developed feelings for each other as they spent more time together. Nagato also coached Atsu in archery, and was responsible for forging her the grappling hook she uses. However, Atsu and Nagato fell out when the latter betrayed the Western Army, having been promised wealth and status by the Eastern factions (led by Tokugawa Ieyasu).

In the present day, Atsu briefly allies with Nagato to take down the Vipers, which leads to them invading the Snake's estate deep in the swamps. They discover a stash of gold, and learn that Lord Saito has used gold from a wrecked Portuguese merchant ship to fund his war effort. They also find out that the Snake was responsible for protecting the bulk of this treasure, and had drawn a map to recover it for his master some day. Although the two initially plan to claim the treasure together, Atsu learns that Nagato has been asking about the bounty on her head. Feeling betrayed, Atsu cuts ties with Nagato.

While on the trail for Saito's fortune, Atsu finds that Nagato has been captured by the Vipers, who turn him over to Saito's elite Black Guard. Rescuing him, Atsu learns that Nagato never intended to claim her bounty, and that he still has feelings for her. Nagato also shares that he intends to use a portion of Saito's fortune to build a forge and begin a new life, touching Atsu and causing her to re-consider her impression of him. In a last-ditch effort to cripple Saito's war effort, Nagato and Atsu bury the gold caravan in a landslide, and recover some of the money. However, the gold is spilled during their escape attempt, and Nagato is killed by the Vipers while attempting to gather the money. A distraught Atsu exacts vengeance on the Vipers, and donates the gold to the people of Ashoro to rebuild their homes, before resuming her quest for revenge.

== Development ==
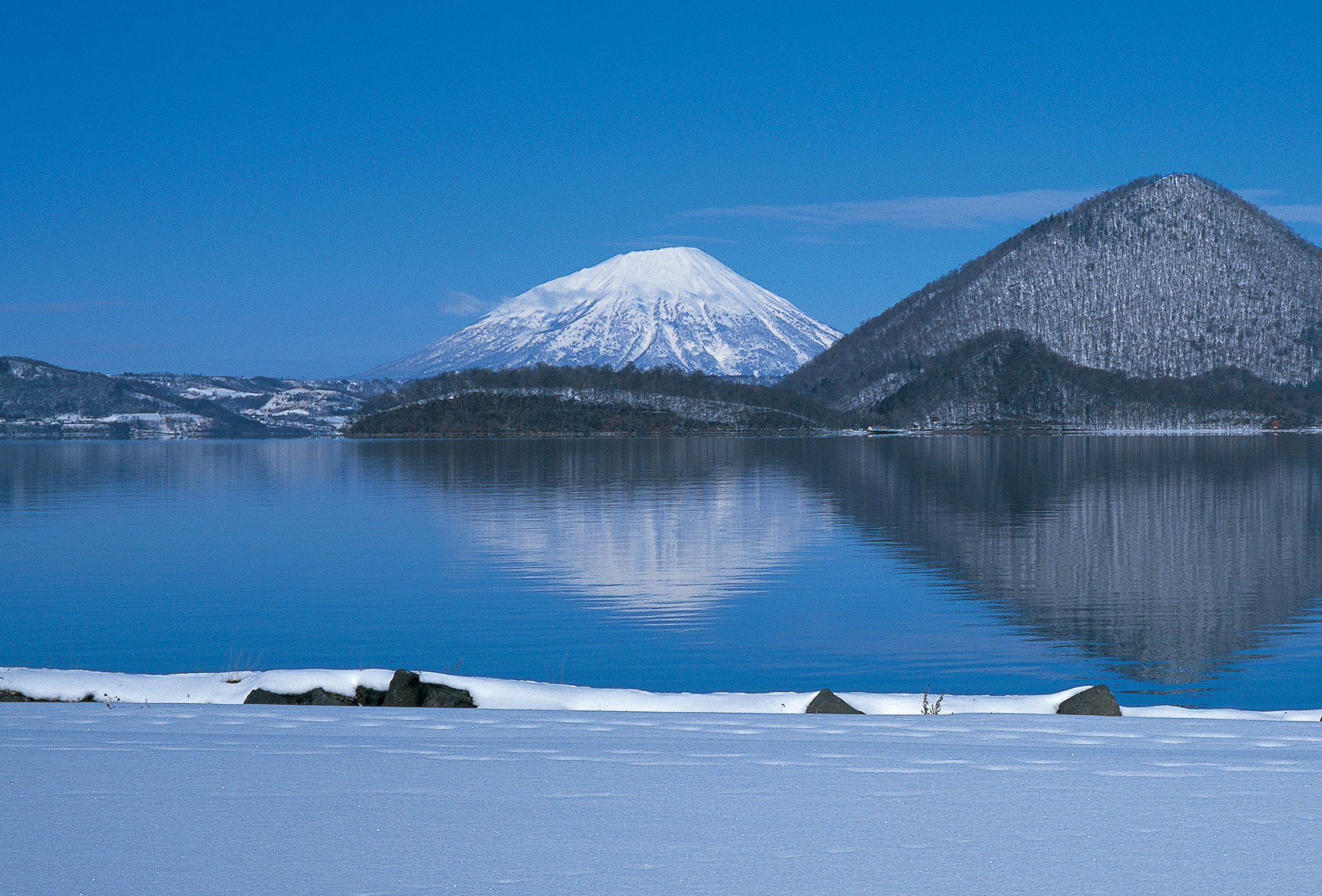
The game's creative directors were inspired by the sight of Mount Yōtei reflecting across Lake Tōya.

Ghost of Yōtei began pre-production in 2021. The game cost around $60 million to develop, similar to its predecessor. According to Rob Davis, Sucker Punch's Campaign Director, the studio wanted the game to be an origin story to allow "the narrative, gameplay, and the character [to] all grow together." Creative directors Nate Fox and Jason Connell worked together on the game's pitch; Fox focussed on the story and character perspectives, including the theme of vengeance, whilst Connell – a former art director – brought ideas focussing on world-building, and wanted Hokkaido as the setting.

During research trips for the game's setting, Sucker Punch Productions were inspired by the "stunning" view of Mount Yōtei reflecting across Lake Tōya, after they had visited "more than a dozen location" across northern Japan. The development team recorded nature sounds at Shiretoko National Park. The team relied upon cultural advisors during development, as well as visiting important cultural sites and consulting with the local Ainu people on their trips to Japan.

The game's directors felt a female protagonist was key to convey the theme of an "underdog defying society's expectations"; Fox said Atsu's in-game reputation as an onryō grows as "People think there's no way this woman could have taken out members of the Yōtei Six unless she is a supernatural creature."

Fox wanted a sequel to Tsushima to maintain its core elements: "transporting the player to the romance and beauty of feudal Japan". Combat was designed to mimic the feel of a "classic samurai movie". Compared to Tsushima, the studio wanted to make the game world of Yōtei more varied, with more unique activities for players to complete.

== Release ==
Ghost of Yōtei was officially revealed during PlayStation's State of Play presentation on September 24, 2024, and it was nominated for Most Anticipated Game at the Game Awards in November 2024. On April 23, 2025, it was confirmed that the game was scheduled for release for the PlayStation 5 on October 2, 2025. In March 2026 it was revealed that despite the port being nearly finished, Ghost of Yotei will not be released on PC.

On September 10, 2025, Sucker Punch developer Drew Harrison posted a joke on Bluesky regarding the assassination of Charlie Kirk. The next day, Harrison reported that she had been subjected to an ongoing harassment campaign and individuals were contacting her employer in an attempt to have her fired. Sucker Punch co-founder Brian Fleming condemned the comment, and Sony confirmed to Kotaku that she was no longer employed by the studio. Upon the release of the game's trailer on September 16, 2025, many of the respondents threatened to boycott Ghost of Yōtei while also writing "RIP Charlie Kirk".

== Reception ==
=== Reviews ===
Reception

Aggregate scores
Aggregator	Score
Metacritic	86/100 (Note: Based on 138 reviews)
OpenCritic	94% recommend (Note: Based on 161 reviews)

Review scores
Publication	Score
Eurogamer	3/5
Famitsu	39/40
GameSpot	9/10
GamesRadar+	4.5/5
IGN	8/10
VideoGamer.com	7/10

Ghost of Yōtei received "generally favorable" reviews, according to review aggregator Metacritic. OpenCritic reported that 94% of critics recommended the game.

GameSpot's Richard Wakling called it an improvement on Tsushima with its "gripping story, rewarding exploration, and fantastic combat". IGN's Michael Higham praised the game's setting and mechanics. Chris Tapsell of Eurogamer lauded its "great swordplay and heartfelt storytelling" while criticizing its "poor sidequests and dated open world".

The game's story received a generally positive reception, with some critics noting issues with its pacing and sidequests. In his review for GameSpot, Wakling called it "a fairly conventional revenge tale, but one that's well told"; IGN's Higham similarly called it a "predictable but well-executed story". In comparison to its predecessor, Polygon's Giovanni Colantonio called it a "more personal, standalone story", while GamesRadar's Andrew Brown called Atsu's story a "more than worthy successor" that "struggled with pacing" towards its end; VideoGamer's Tom Bardwell called it an improvement over Tsushima, but noted the pacing was "questionable". Eurogamer's Tapsell felt it would have been "better served as a linear action game", and that the game's side-quests felt "prehistoric".

=== Sales ===
By September 20, 2025, Ghost of Yōtei was one of the top-selling games on the PlayStation Store's pre-order charts, placing first in Australia and Canada, and second in France, Germany, Japan, Poland, United Kingdom, and the United States. By September 27, it had reached number one in thirteen countries. It was the 11th best-selling game of 2025 in the US.

The game was the third best selling title in the United States in October 2025 behind Battlefield 6 and Pokémon Legends: Z-A. According to Famitsu, Ghost of Yōtei sold an estimated 120,196 retail copies during the week September 29 to October 5, 2025 of its debut in Japan. Sony's financial reports stated Ghost of Yōtei sold about 3.3 million units as of November 2, 2025.

=== Awards ===
Year	Award	Category	Result	Ref.
2025	Golden Joystick Awards	Ultimate Game of the Year	Nominated	
2025	Golden Joystick Awards	Best Visual Design	Nominated	
2025	Golden Joystick Awards	Best Audio Design	Won	
2025	Golden Joystick Awards	Best Lead Performer (Erika Ishii)	Nominated	
2025	Golden Joystick Awards	Console Game of the Year	Won	
2025	16th Hollywood Music in Media Awards	Score – Video Game (Console & PC)	Nominated	
2025	The Game Awards 2025	Best Game Direction	Nominated	
2025	The Game Awards 2025	Best Narrative	Nominated	
2025	The Game Awards 2025	Best Art Direction	Nominated	
2025	The Game Awards 2025	Best Score and Music	Nominated	
2025	The Game Awards 2025	Best Audio Design	Nominated	
2025	The Game Awards 2025	Best Performance (Erika Ishii)	Nominated	
2025	The Game Awards 2025	Best Action/Adventure Game	Nominated	
2026	15th New York Game Awards	Big Apple Award for Best Game of the Year	Nominated	
2026	15th New York Game Awards	Herman Melville Award for Best Writing in a Game	Nominated	
2026	15th New York Game Awards	Great White Way Award for Best Acting in a Game (Erika Ishii)	Nominated	
2026	15th New York Game Awards	Tin Pan Alley Award for Best Music in a Game	Nominated	
2026	29th Annual D.I.C.E. Awards	Game of the Year	Nominated	
2026	29th Annual D.I.C.E. Awards	Adventure Game of the Year	Won	
2026	29th Annual D.I.C.E. Awards	Outstanding Achievement in Game Direction	Nominated	
2026	29th Annual D.I.C.E. Awards	Outstanding Achievement in Animation	Nominated	
2026	29th Annual D.I.C.E. Awards	Outstanding Achievement in Art Direction	Nominated	
2026	29th Annual D.I.C.E. Awards	Outstanding Achievement in Character (Atsu)	Won	
2026	29th Annual D.I.C.E. Awards	Outstanding Achievement in Original Music Composition	Won	
2026	29th Annual D.I.C.E. Awards	Outstanding Achievement in Audio Design	Nominated	
2026	53rd Annie Awards	Best Character Animation – Video Game	Nominated	
2026	26th Game Developers Choice Awards	Best Audio	Nominated	
2026	26th Game Developers Choice Awards	Best Narrative	Nominated	
2026	26th Game Developers Choice Awards	Best Technology	Nominated	
2026	26th Game Developers Choice Awards	Best Visual Art	Nominated	
2026	26th Game Developers Choice Awards	Game of the Year	Nominated	
2026	International Film Music Critics Association Awards 2025	Best Original Score for a Video Game or Interactive Media	Nominated	
2026	73rd Golden Reel Awards	Outstanding Achievement in Sound Editing – Game Dialogue / ADR	Nominated	
2026	73rd Golden Reel Awards	Outstanding Achievement in Music Editing – Game Music	Won	
2026	73rd Golden Reel Awards	Outstanding Achievement in Sound Editing – Game Effects / Foley	Nominated	
2026	22nd British Academy Games Awards	Best Game	Nominated	
2026	22nd British Academy Games Awards	Animation	Nominated	
2026	22nd British Academy Games Awards	Artistic Achievement	Nominated	
2026	22nd British Academy Games Awards	Audio Achievement	Nominated	
2026	22nd British Academy Games Awards	Game Design	Nominated	
2026	22nd British Academy Games Awards	Music	Won	
2026	22nd British Academy Games Awards	Narrative	Longlisted	
2026	22nd British Academy Games Awards	Performer in a Leading Role (Erika Ishii)	Nominated	
2026	22nd British Academy Games Awards	Technical Achievement	Won	
2026	24th Visual Effects Society Awards	Outstanding Visual Arts in a Real-Time Project	Won	
2026	Develop:Star Awards 2026	Best Game	Nominated	
2026	Develop:Star Awards 2026	Best Visual Art	Won	
2026	Develop:Star Awards 2026	Best Game Design	Nominated	
2026	Develop:Star Awards 2026	Best Narrative	Nominated	
2026	Develop:Star Awards 2026	Best Marketing Campaign	Nominated	
2026	Develop:Star Awards 2026	Best Technical Innovation	Nominated	
2026	TIGA Awards 2026	Best Visual Design	Won	
2027	69th Annual Grammy Awards	Best Score Soundtrack for Video Games and Other Interactive Media	Pending	
2027	69th Annual Grammy Awards	Best Immersive Audio Album	Pending	
