= Koshamain's War =

War in Japan in 1457

- Part of the Ainu rebellions
- Map of the Twelve Garrisons of Dōnan, 10 of which were captured by the Ainu
Date	1457–1458
Location	Oshima Peninsula, Hokkaido, Japan
Result	Japanese victory

Belligerents
Kakizaki clan	Ainu

Commanders and leaders
Takeda Nobuhiro	Koshamain †

Koshamain's War (コシャマインの戦い, Koshamain no tatakai) was an armed struggle between the Ainu and Wajin that took place on the Oshima Peninsula of southern Hokkaidō, Japan, between 1457 and 1458. Escalating out of a dispute over the purchase of a knife, Koshamain and his followers sacked twelve forts in southern Ezo (道南十二館), before being overcome by superior forces under Takeda Nobuhiro. The principal record of the conflict is the Shinra no Kiroku, written in 1646. However, as it was written approximately 200 years after the events, historians note that its contents require critical verification. The conflict was a pivotal event in the history of the region, leading to the consolidation of Japanese power and the eventual formation of the Matsumae Domain.

== Background ==
During the 15th century, the Ainu did not possess iron-smelting technology and relied on trade for iron goods. They traded with Ming China and with Japanese settlers who had expanded into the southern Oshima Peninsula (known as the Watari-to or the "Twelve Fortified Residences" area). Following the Tumu Crisis in 1449, Ming China's influence over northern peoples waned, causing Ainu trade with China to decline and their dependence on Wajin trade to increase; the Ainu resentment over territorial invasion and "unfair" Japanese trading ran high during the lead up to the war. Concurrently, the political landscape of southern Hokkaido was in flux. The main branch of the Ando clan had been destroyed following the defeat and suicide of Ando Yoshisue — the local lord of Mutsu and Ezo — during conflict with the Nanbu clan, creating a power vacuum in the region.

== Course of the war ==
The conflict was triggered by a dispute in 1456 at Shinori (modern-day Zenigamezawa, Hakodate). An Ainu man, referred to in records as Okkay (likely the Ainu word for "man" or "young man"), ordered a small ritual knife (makiri) from a Wajin blacksmith. A dispute arose regarding the quality and price of the knife. In the ensuing argument, the blacksmith stabbed and killed the Ainu man. While the Shinra no Kiroku uses the term Otsugai (乙孩) to describe the victim, later interpretations and accounts by 17th-century visitors, such as the Italian Jesuit Girolamo de Angelis, suggest the victim may have been a youth.^{[a]}

In response to the killing, the Ainu unified under the leadership of the chieftain Koshamain^{[b]}. In May 1457, they launched a wide-scale offensive against Japanese settlements, spanning from Mukawa in the east to Yoichi in the west. The Ainu forces successfully captured 10 of the Twelve Garrisons of Dōnan (道南十二館 (Dōnan Jūni-tate)), the primary defensive outposts of the Wajin settlers. Only two forts, Hanazawa and Mobetsu, remained under Japanese control. In 1458, Takeda Nobuhiro, a retainer of the Hanazawa lord Kakizaki Sueshige, led a counteroffensive. At the battle of Nanaehama, Nobuhiro used a bow to kill both Koshamain and his son. Following the death of their leader, the Ainu forces disintegrated and the uprising was suppressed.

== Aftermath and legacy ==
The conflict marked the beginning of a century of intermittent warfare between the Ainu and Wajin. The victory solidified the position of Takeda Nobuhiro, whose descendants eventually established the Matsumae Domain, which would dominate trade and political relations with the Ainu for centuries. Despite this consolidation, the Ainu continued to resist Japanese expansion, leading to later major uprisings such as Shakushain's revolt in 1669 and the Menashi-Kunashir rebellion in 1789.

Some scholars, such as Nobuo Irumada, suggest that the conflict should be viewed against the backdrop of the power struggle between the Nanbu and Andō clans in the northern Ou region, citing the movements of Andō Masasue, who resided in southern Hokkaido until the year before the incident. Conversely, Masato Kobayashi proposes a theory that frames the war as part of an effort by Takeda Nobuhiro and Shimokuni Iemasa to unify Ezo under their control.

Since 1994, an annual memorial service has been held in early July at Mount Io (Iōzan) in Kaminokuni, Hokkaido, organized by both Ainu and Wajin volunteers to pray for peace. In 2025, for the first time in history, descendants of the Kakizaki clan participated in the ceremony.

== See also ==
- Shakushain's revolt
- Menashi-Kunashir rebellion
- Colonisation of Hokkaido

== Notes ==
- ^{1} On the other hand, various records that have survived at least since the early modern period suggest that the Ainu term okkay refers to men in general, not just young men, and that it is questionable whether children would have been allowed to trade in valuable iron products in the first place.
- ^{2} (Also known as Koshamainu or Kosamainu – Japanese: "胡奢魔犬" – other spellings such as "胡奢魔犾", "胡奢麻尹", and "胡奢魔尹" can also be seen.)
