= Matsumae =

Matsumae may refer to:

- Matsumae (surname), a Japanese surname
- Matsumae clan, a former Japanese clan
- Matsumae Castle, a castle located in Matsumae in Hokkaidō, Japan
- Matsumae, Hokkaidō, a town located in Matsumae District, Oshima, Hokkaidō, Japan
- Matsumae District, Hokkaidō, a district located in southwestern Oshima Subprefecture, Hokkaidō, Japan
