= Shakushain's revolt =

Rebellion (1669 to 1672)

- Part of the Ainu rebellions
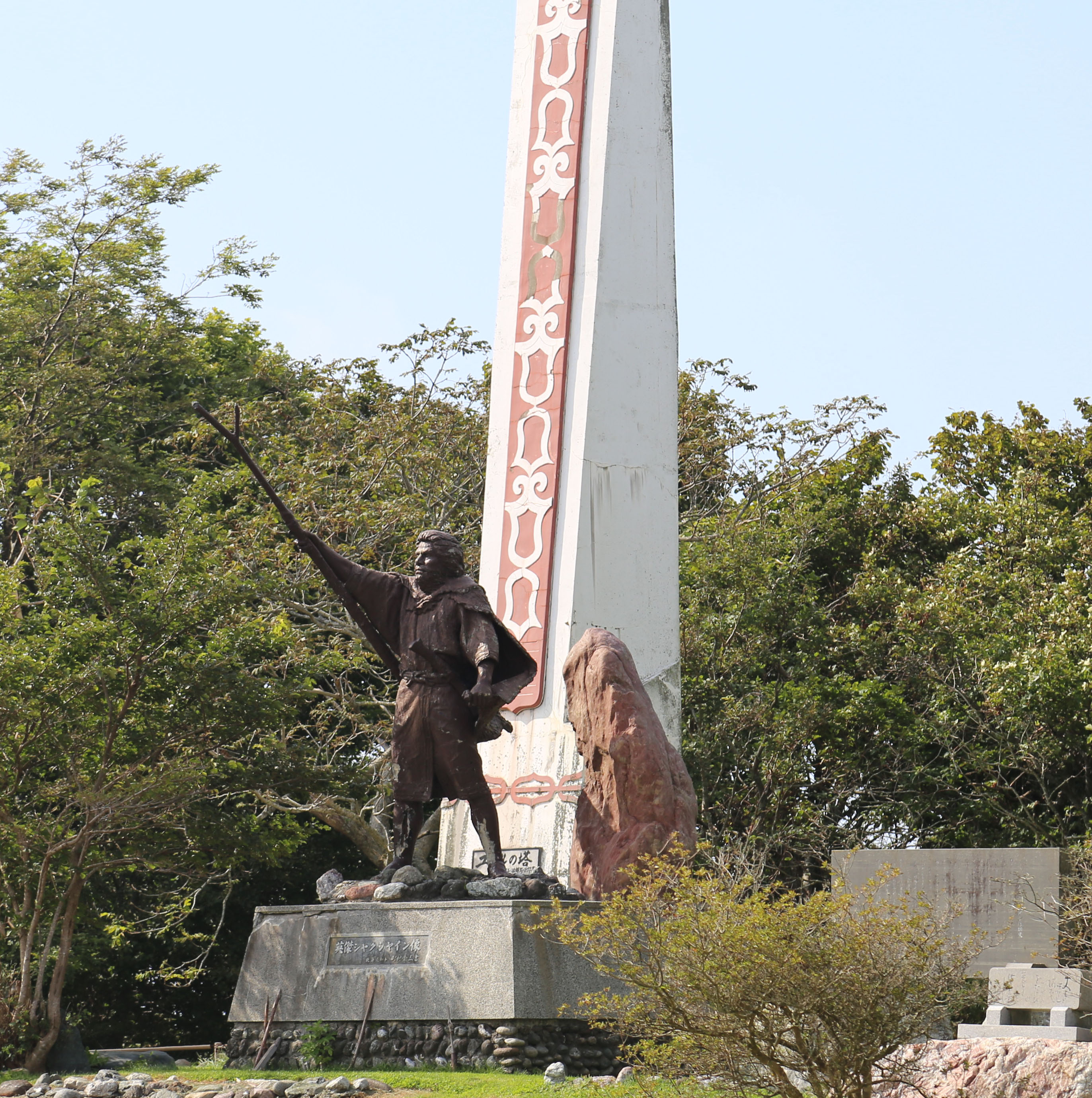
- Monument to Shakushain at the site of the surrender
Date	1669 to 1672
Location	Hokkaido, Japan
Result	Japanese victory

Belligerents
Matsumae clan Supported by: Tokugawa shogunate	Ainu

Commanders and leaders
Norihiro Matsumae Yasuhiro Matsumae	Shakushain †

The revolt of Shakushain (シャクシャインの戦い, Shakushain no tatakai) was an Ainu rebellion against Japanese authority on Hokkaido between 1669 and 1672 in the Edo period. It was led by Ainu chieftain Shakushain against the Matsumae clan, who represented Japanese trading and governmental interests in the area of Hokkaido, then controlled by the Japanese (Yamato people).

== Background ==
The Matsumae clan were given the area around present-day Matsumae, Hokkaido, what would become the Matsumae Domain, as a march fief in 1590 by Toyotomi Hideyoshi. They were charged with defending it, and by extension the whole of Japan, from the Ainu "barbarians" of the north.

Trade between the Ainu and the Yamato changed greatly over time. In the early days, the Ainu often traveled to the Matsumae domain to carry out trade, and could freely trade with anyone. However, in the first half of the 17th century, the Tokugawa shogunate officially granted the Matsumae clan exclusive rights to trade with the Ainu in the northern part of the island. The Matsumae then began to grant the trading right with the Ainu to their samurai as a substitute for a fief. The samurai were assigned trading posts set up in various parts of Hokkaido to trade with the Ainu. The samurai began to force trade goods on the unwilling Ainu, and to overfish salmon using large nets. Furthermore, in 1665, the Matsumae set the exchange rate at a disadvantage to the Ainu. It is believed that this type of trade caused growing dissatisfaction among the Ainu towards the Yamato.

== Revolt ==
In 1669, the revolt began as a fight for resources between Shakushain's people and another Ainu clan led by Hae in the Shibuchari River basin of what is now Shinhidaka, Hokkaido. Concerned that this conflict would worsen trade relations, the Matsumae clan sent envoys to persuade both sides, and invited them to Matsumae Castle City to mediate, temporarily halting the conflict; however, it later reignited. After Shakushain killed Hae's son, Hae sent emissaries to the Matsumae to request arms and potential remediation. While travelling back members of the emissaries died of smallpox, with reports reaching Hae and Shakushain that they had been poisoned by the Matsumae. As a result, Shakushain called on all the Ainu of Hokkaido to work together to fight the Matsumae. The Ainu coalition demanded complete political independence from the Matsumae and Yamato, and a return to the direct trading rights with Honshū, instead of the Matsumae mediated trade currently in place. The Ainu began to attack Yamato people, ships, mining camps, and trading forts in Hokkaido, and they also aimed to capture the colonial cities in the Matsumae Domain.

At the end of 1669, Shakushain's forces surrendered to the Matsumae, assassinated by Matsumae warriors. Afterwards, the war lasted for about three years. The rebellion was eventually quashed, with Shogun Tokugawa Ienobu rewarding the Matsumae for this result.

Historian Brett Walker highlights the rebellion as a watershed moment in the history of the Yamato Japanese conquest of Hokkaido, as it solidified the future involvement of Japanese state powers in colonising Hokkaido instead of it being left to the local Matsumae clan:

The war of Shakushain stands out as a watershed event in the history of the conquest of Ezo. Shakushain exploded onto the scene as a charismatic leader who proved able to bridge regional differences among Ainu communities, threatening to unite them against the Japanese intrusion from the south. The Tokugawa shogunate reacted by solidifying its own united front of military allies in the northeast, replacing local Matsumae generals with men of its own choosing, thus illustrating its self-appointed role as defender of the realm.

== Aftermath ==
After suppression of the revolt, Japan consolidated its control of Hokkaido. The peace treaty bound the Ainu to swear allegiance to Matsumae. The Ainu tribes remained autonomous, but Matsumae quickly established 60 new trading posts in Hokkaido and suppressed monopolistic trade prices, to the point that some Ainu settlements were reportedly on the verge of famine. Those unable to support themselves had no choice but to work as forced labor in fish factories in Honshu on a salary about a seventh of the rate paid to the Yamato.

== See also ==
- Colonisation of Hokkaido

Other Ainu-Yamato conflicts:

- Koshamain's Revolt (1457)
- Menashi–Kunashir rebellion (1789)
