= Menashi–Kunashir rebellion =

1789 battle between Wajin and Ainu in Northeastern Hokkaido

- Part of the Ainu rebellions
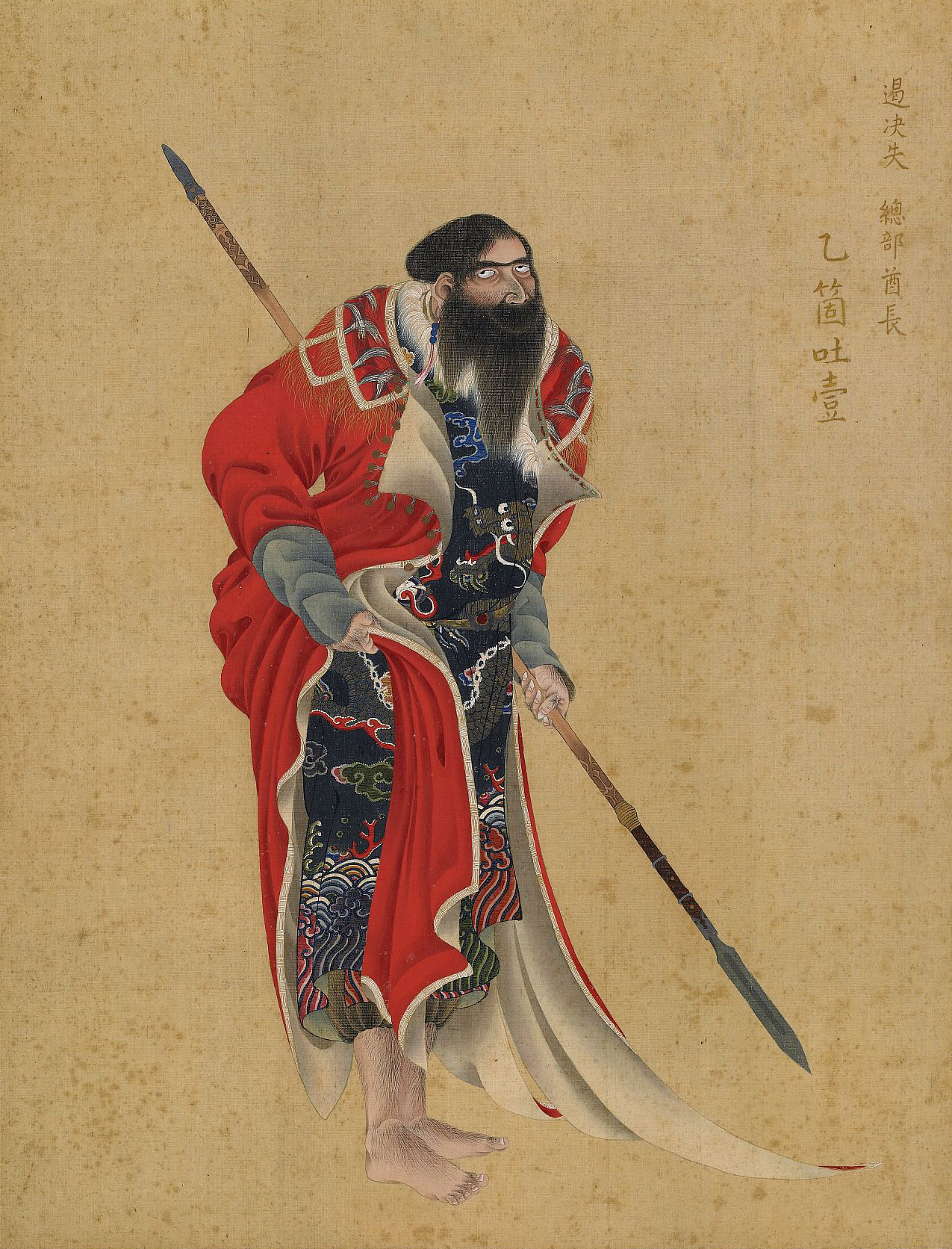
- Ikotoi, chief of Akkeshi who assisted the Japanese, as portrayed in the Ishūretsuzō
Date	1789
Location	Menashi-Kunashir, Japan
Result	Japanese victory

Belligerents
Matsumae clan	Ainu

The Menashi-Kunashir rebellion or war (クナシリ・メナシの戦い, Kunashiri Menashi no tatakai) or Menashi-Kunashir battle took place in 1789 between the Ainu and the Yamato people (i.e. the ethnic Japanese) on the Shiretoko Peninsula in northeastern Hokkaido.

Through the Edo period the Matsumae clan developed the fishing industry in Hokkaido, where Yamato Japanese merchants oversaw Ainu fishers whose catch was processed and sold to the Yamato Japanese of Honshu. The Ainu working in this industry were forced into it, and subjected to rampant exploitation. In response to the exploitation and the abuses of Ainu workers in the industry, and potentially a suspicion of poisoned sake being given to Ainu in a loyalty ceremony, in May 1789 the Ainu attacked the Yamato on Kunashir and parts of the Menashi District, as well as at sea. More than 70 Yamato were killed. The Yamato executed 37 Ainu identified as conspirators and arrested many others.

== Background ==
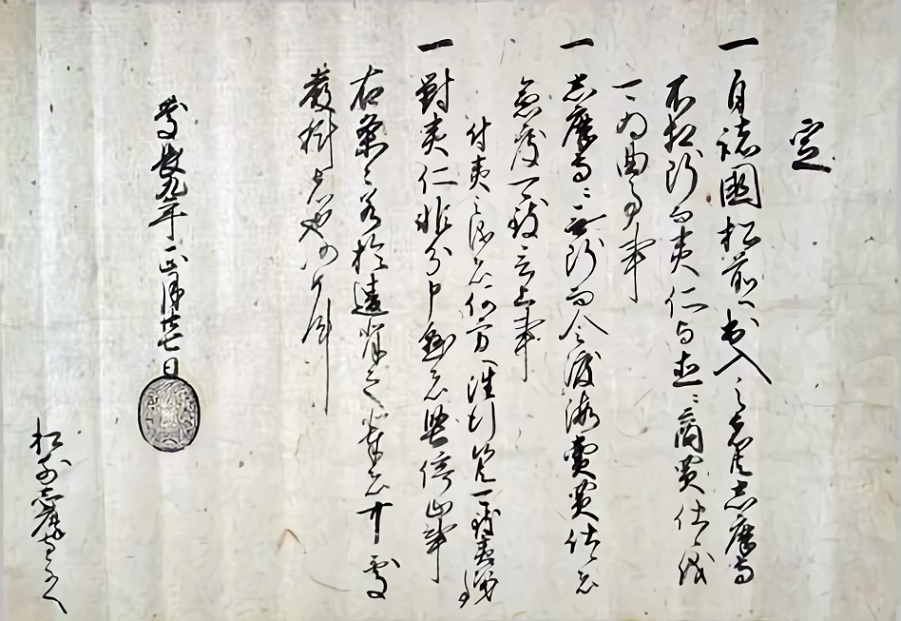
Black seal letter of 1604 from shogun Tokugawa Ieyasu to Matsumae Yoshihiro, first daimyō of Matsumae Domain, granting the Domain exclusivity as intermediaries in trade with the people of Ezo (Hokkaido Museum)

In 1604, the Tokugawa shogunate granted the Matsumae Domain exclusivity in trade with the people of Ezo. From the 1630s, these exchanges were managed through the so-called akinaiba chigyo sei [ja] trade-fief system, which saw Ezochi demarcated into a number of trading posts (known as akinaiba or basho), each assigned to a senior vassal of the Matsumae clan, with exclusive rights to trade with the local Ainu. Following Shakushain's revolt and during the eighteenth century, this was gradually replaced by the basho ukeoi sei [ja] or subcontracted trading post system, with Japanese merchants granted rights to manage local trade on behalf of the Matsumae clan vassals, in exchange for commission. The outcome was loss of economic independence, as the Ainu increasingly became in effect labourers in fisheries and other businesses operated by Wajin merchants.

== Rebellion ==
In 1788, merchant Hidaya Kyūbei (飛騨屋久兵衛) began commercial fishing operations in the Menashi-Kunashiri area, employing Ainu workers to catch salmon and trout for use as fertilizer. Worked so hard that they had insufficient time to lay up food for the winter, food shortages combined with overbearing behaviour — including fishery supervisors making Ainu wives their mistresses — and suspicions of poisonings sparked the Menashi–Kunashir rebellion of May 1789. While local potentate Tsukinoe was away hunting sea otters on Uruppu, seventy-one Wajin were killed, twenty-two of them on Kunashiri, the rest in the Menashi area, all but one of them (a Matsumae Domain soldier) Hidaya employees. When news reached Matsumae at the beginning of June, daimyō Matsumae Michihiro despatched 260 soldiers, who made their way east, recruiting local Ainu chieftains as they went. Arriving in the Nemuro area in July, over three hundred of those involved surrendered, and of the thirty-eight directly involved in the killings — including Tsukinoe's son Seppayabu — all but one (who had fled) were beheaded, their heads stored in salt. In the aftermath, Matsumae Michihiro commissioned the Ishūretsuzō series of portraits of twelve Ainu elders who had helped suppress the revolt.

== In literature ==
The battle is the subject of Majin no Umi, a children's novel by Maekawa Yasuo that received the Japanese Association of Writers for Children Prize in 1970.

== See also ==
- Shakushain's revolt, a similar large-scale Ainu revolt against Yamato influence
- Colonisation of Hokkaido
