= Diogo de Carvalho =

Blessed Diogo Carvalho SJ
- Diogo de Carvalho
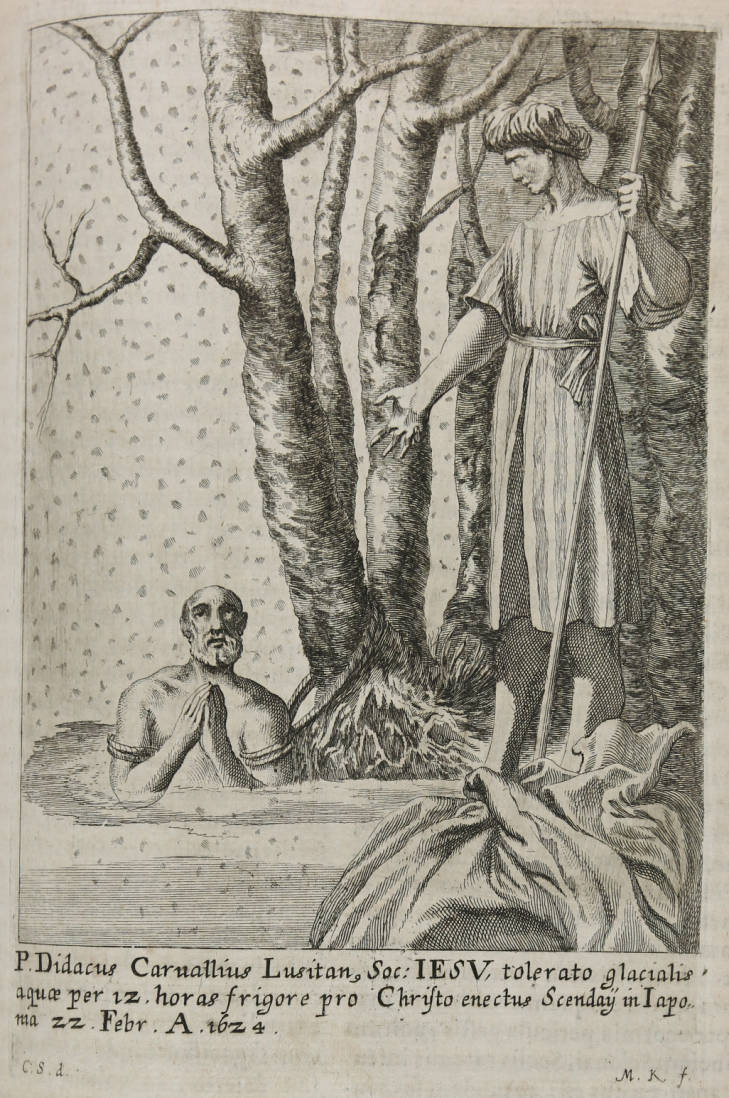

Personal life
- Born: 1578 Coimbra, Portugal
- Died: 22 February 1624 (aged 45–46) Sendai, Japan
- Cause of death: Martyred (icy waters)
- Parents: Alvaro Fernandes (father); Margarita Luis (mother)

Religious life
- Religion: Christianity
- Denomination: Roman Catholicism
- Order: Jesuit
- Ordination: 1608
- Website: www.jesuits.global/saint-blessed/blessed-diogo-carvalho/

Diogo de Carvalho, SJ (1578 – 22 February 1624) was a Portuguese Jesuit missionary martyred in Edo period Japan.

== Biography ==
Carvalho was born in Coimbra, Portugal, in 1578. After entering the Society of Jesus in his hometown in 1594, late in 1600 he arrived, after a long voyage with sixteen other Jesuits, in Goa, India. The following year he set out for Macau, where he was ordained as priest in 1608. In 1609, he arrived in Japan, where, learning Japanese, he was a missionary in the Amakusa Islands, before relocating to Kyōto around 1612.

After the edict of proscription of 1614, in November that year, with seventy-two other Jesuits on three Chinese junks, Carvalho was deported to Macau. Establishing a mission in Đàng Trong (called Cochinchina by Europeans at the time), he remained in Vietnam for a year, before secretly returning to Japan in 1616. He spent two years in the Ōmura Domain in the area of Nagasaki, before joining Jerome de Angelis in Tōhoku, with the alias Nagasaki Goroemon as his cover. Basing himself in the fief of Gotō Juan (後藤寿庵), he twice travelled to the Matsumae Domain in Ezo, while Matsumae Kinhiro was daimyō, first in 1620, then again in 1622.

Early in 1624, Carvalho was martyred in a pit filled with the icy waters of the Hirose River (広瀬川) in Sendai. A long letter by Carvalho detailing his encounters in Tōhoku and Hokkaidō survives.

== Veneration ==
Carvalho's sainthood cause was opened after his death. He was later beatified.

== See also ==
- History of the Catholic Church in Japan
- 26 Martyrs of Japan
- Kakure Kirishitan
- Francisco de Pina
