= Matsumae (surname) =

Matsumae (written: 松前) is a Japanese surname. Notable people with the surname include:

- Matsumae Akihiro (松前 章広, 1775–1833), Japanese daimyō
- Manami Matsumae (松前 真奈美, born 1964), Japanese video game composer
- Shigeyoshi Matsumae (松前 重義, 1901–1991), Japanese electrical engineer, inventor and politician
- Matsumae Takahiro (松前 崇広, 1829–1866), Japanese daimyō
- Matsumae Yoshihiro (松前 慶広, 1548–1616), Japanese daimyō

== Fictional characters ==
- Ohana Matsumae (松前 緒花), a character in the anime series Hanasaku Iroha
