= Matsumae Yoshihiro =

Japanese daimyō

- 松前慶広
- First Matsumae Domain Lord; Matsumae Yoshihiro (Aun-ji (阿吽寺) in Matsumae)

1st Daimyō of Matsumae Domain
- Monarch: Shōgun: Tokugawa Ieyasu
- Succeeded by: Matsumae Kinhiro

Personal details
- Born: October 4, 1548
- Died: November 20, 1616 (aged 68)
- Children: Morihiro (盛広), Tadahiro (忠広)
- Parent: Kakizaki Suehiro (蠣崎季広) (father)

Kakizaki Yoshihiro, later Matsumae Yoshihiro (松前 慶広, October 4, 1548 – November 20, 1616), was the first daimyō of Matsumae Domain in Ezo, (Hokkaidō), Japan.

== Biography ==
Born on the third day of the ninth month of Tenbun 9 (1548), Yoshihiro was the third son of Kakizaki Suehiro. While the Kakizaki clan at this date exerted suzerainty over the lords of the local fortified residences (館) on the Oshima Peninsula, they were themselves subordinate to the Andō clan of Tōhoku; moreover, their authority was limited to the Japanese inhabitants of the "Land of the Wajin" (和人地, Wajinchi), rather than encompassing also the Ainu with whom they traded. After Toyotomi Hideyoshi defeated the Hōjō at Odawara in 1590, and took measures to check the power of the great clans of the north, Yoshihiro travelled to Kyōto, where in the twelfth month of that year he enjoyed an audience with the kampaku at the Jurakudai palace. Reporting on the state of affairs in Ezo, Yoshiro declined a grant of five thousand koku, but had bestowed upon him Junior Fifth Court Rank, Lower Grade and the office of Minbu Taifu (民部大輔) or Senior Vice Minister in the Ministry of Popular Affairs, thus gaining independence from the Andō. Receiving from Hideyoshi also three gorgeous costumes and two hundred ryō of silver, he departed again for the north, reaching the Oshima Peninsula in the third month of 1591. Later that year, Yoshihiro sent troops to help suppress the Kunohe Rebellion, the arrows of the contingent of Ainu seeing mention in Mikawa Go-fudoki (ja) for their remarkable quality of dealing death even upon the lightly injured. In the eleventh month of the first year of Bunroku (1592), Yoshihiro travelled to Ōsaka, but Hideyoshi was at Hizen Nagoya, in relation to the invasion of Korea; reaching his camp in Kyūshū, as recorded in Shinra no Kiroku, on the second day of the new year Yoshihiro enjoyed another audience with Hideyoshi, where the two discussed Ezo and the invasion. Three days later, Yoshihiro had conferred upon him a red-seal letter (ja) affirming his rights to trade with the Ainu. (Note: "At Matsumae, since men on boats, traders, etc, come from all directions, and again in relation to the barbarians, who also dwell underground, in no wise can righteousness prevail and hold sway. Furthermore, as to the matter of shipping duties, assuredly, just as has been the case in earlier times, so should they be levied henceforth ... Bunroku 2 [1593], first month, fifth day. [Red Seal (ja)] To Kakizaki, Lord and Guardian of the Islands" 於松前、従諸方来船頭商人等、対夷人、同地下人、非分義不可申懸、並船役之事、自前々如有来可取之、自然此旨於相背族在之者、急度可言上、速可被加御誅罰者也 文禄二正月五日 朱印 蠣崎志摩守トノヘ) In 1604 he was granted exclusive trading rights with the Ainu by shōgun Tokugawa Ieyasu. While neither document conferred specific territorial rights or a "fictive rice income", the Matsumae Domain would generally be treated as equivalent to tozama daimyō with an income of ten thousand koku.

Yoshihiro built Matsumae Castle (also known as Fukuyama Castle (Fukuyama-jō 福山城).

== See also ==
- Takeda Nobuhiro

== Notes ==
Preceded by none	Daimyō of Matsumae; 1583–1616	Succeeded by Matsumae Kinhiro
