= Matsumae Takahiro =

Daimyo who ruled the Matsumae Domain

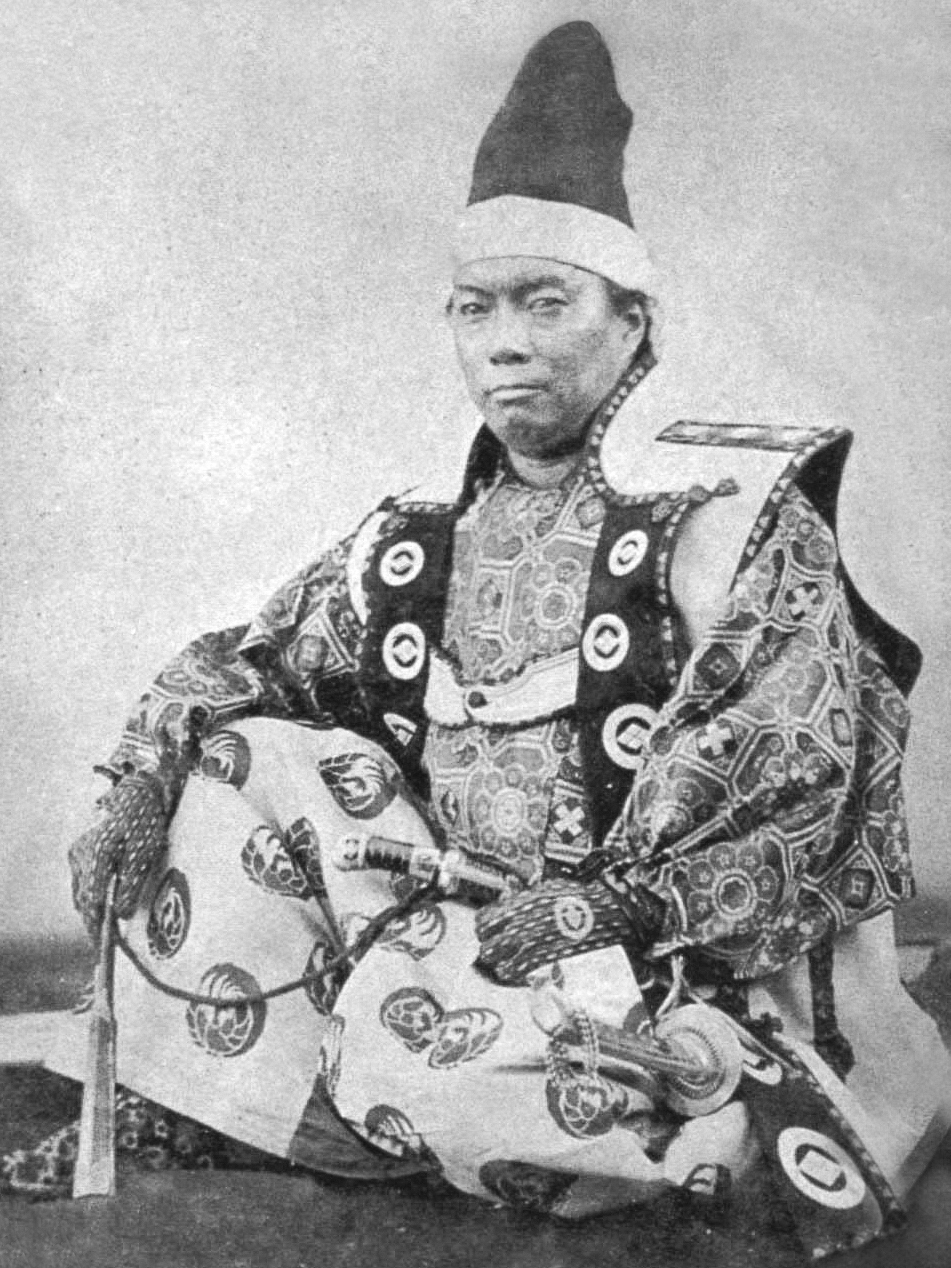

12th Lord of Matsumae
- In office 1849–1865
- Preceded by: Matsumae Masahiro
- Succeeded by: Matsumae Norihiro

Personal details
- Born: December 10, 1829 Matsumae Castle, Ezo
- Died: June 9, 1866 (aged 36) Matsumae Castle, Ezo

Matsumae Takahiro (松前 崇広; December 10, 1829 – June 9, 1866) was a Japanese daimyō (military lord) of the Edo period, who ruled the Matsumae Domain. Though he was a tozama daimyō, he served in the Tokugawa Shogunate as a rōjū. His court title was Izu no kami.

== Youth ==
Takahiro, whose childhood name was Tamekichi, was born at Matsumae Castle in Ezo (Modern Hokkaido). He was the 6th son of Matsumae Akihiro, the 9th lord of Matsumae. At age 4, he was sent to the family estate in Edo. In an act most unusual for a daimyō's son, his education included the study of the English language.

He succeeded to lordship of Matsumae in 1849.

== Rise to Power as Rōjū ==
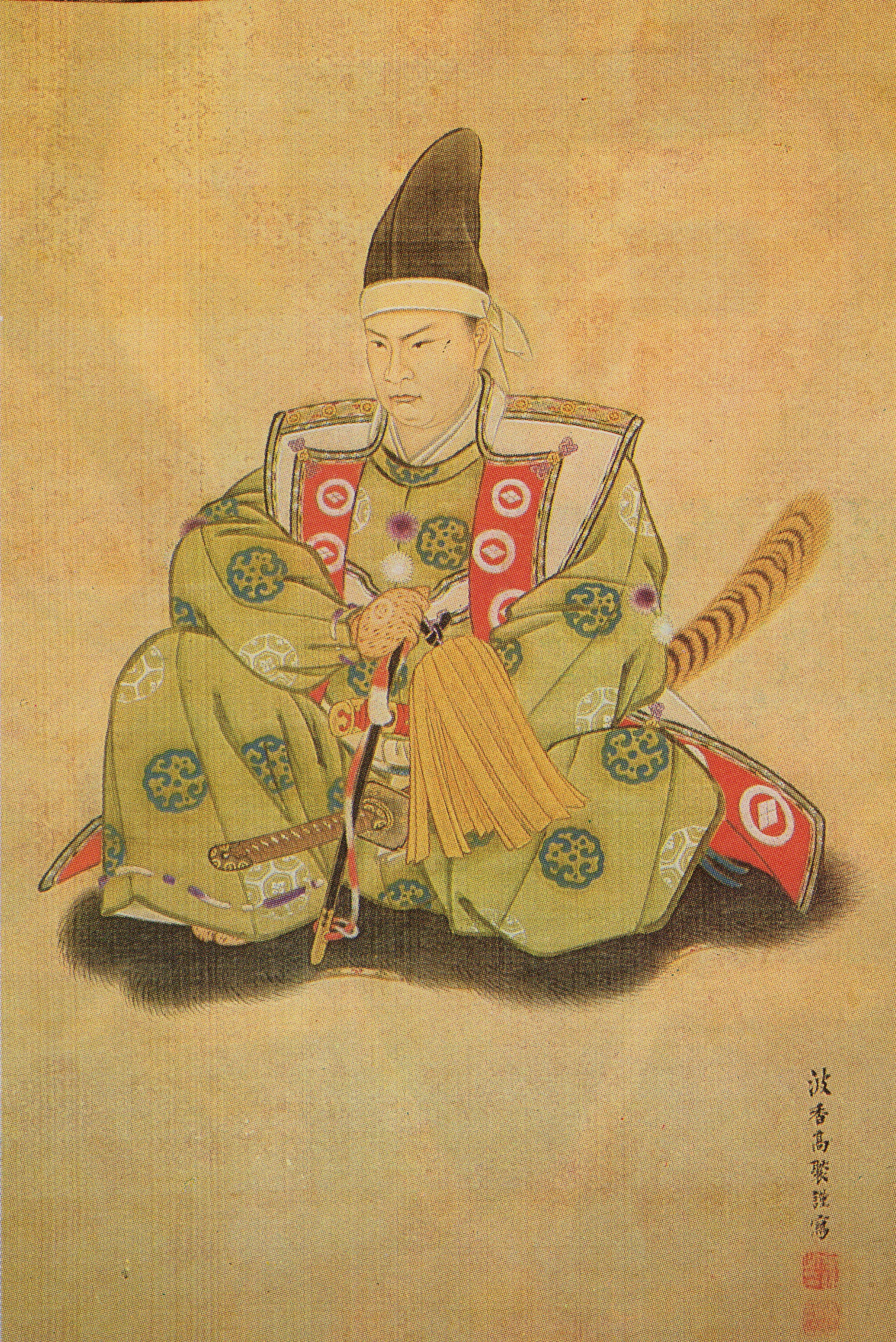
Portrait of Matsumae Takahiro

Takahiro was appointed as rōjū in November 1864; this was a post that was unheard of for a Tokugawa tozama daimyō. The following year, he and his fellow rōjū Abe Masato were responsible for the opening of the Hyōgo port to foreign trade. However, as they did so against the wishes of the imperial court, the court issued orders calling for their dismissal from office. Both men lost their offices, court rank, and titles, and were forced to yield lordship of their domains. Takahiro retired in favor of his eldest son Norihiro.

== Death ==
Takahiro returned to Matsumae in the spring of 1866. Soon after, he contracted a fever and died at age 36. A few years after Takahiro's death, his grandson Nagahiro petitioned the imperial court for a pardon, which was granted, along with a restoration of his court rank and titles.

== Media ==
Takahiro has appeared infrequently in fictional depictions of the bakumatsu era. Most recently, he appeared as a minor character in the manga Kaze Hikaru.

Preceded by Matsumae Masahiro	12th Lord of Matsumae; 1849-1865	Succeeded by Matsumae Norihiro
