= Matsumae Akihiro =

Japanese daimyō

Matsumae Akihiro (1775–1833)
- 松前章広
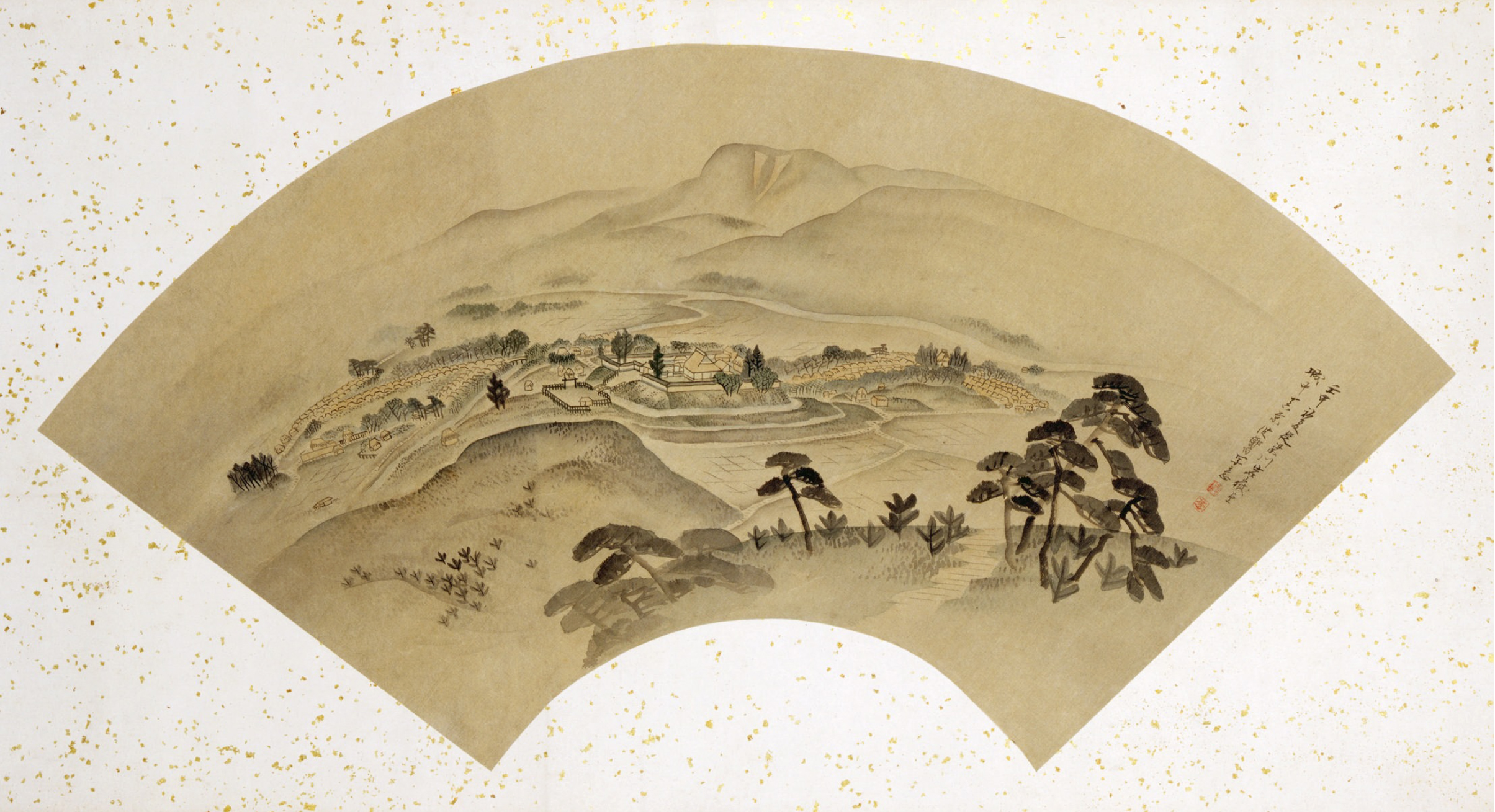
- From Eight Views of Yanagawa (1812), by Kakizaki Hakyō (Hakodate City Central Library)

9th Daimyō of Matsumae Domain
- In office 1792–1807
- Monarch: Shōgun: Tokugawa Ienari
- Preceded by: Matsumae Michihiro

Daimyō of Yanagawa Domain
- In office 1807–1821
- Monarch: Shōgun: Tokugawa Ienari

9th Daimyō of Matsumae Domain
- In office 1821–1833
- Monarch: Shōgun: Tokugawa Ienari
- Succeeded by: Matsumae Yoshihiro

Personal details
- Born: An'ei 4 7th month 30th day 25 August 1775
- Died: Tenpō 4 9th month 25th day 6 November 1833 (aged 58)
- Children: 6 sons, 8 daughters, inc: Chikahiro (見広); Takahiro
- Parent: Matsumae Michihiro (father)
- Relatives: Matsumae clan

Matsumae Akihiro (松前 章広; 8 August 1775 – 6 November 1833) was the ninth daimyō of Matsumae Domain in Ezo-chi, Japan, in the latter half of the Edo period. He held this position from 1792 to 1807 and again from 1821 until his death in 1833; in the years between, the bakufu exerted direct control over the whole of Ezo, while the Matsumae clan were relocated to Yanagawa Domain. He was successor to his father Matsumae Michihiro and succeeded in turn by his grandson Matsumae Yoshihiro.

== Names ==
He originally went by the name of Shikihiro (敷広) and was also known as Yūnosuke (勇之助).

== Biography ==
Matsumae Akihiro was born in An'ei 4 (1775), the eldest son of Matsumae Michihiro, eighth daimyō of Matsumae Domain. In Kansei 4 (1792), his father stepping aside, he became the ninth daimyō. Alerted to the question of the northern frontier by the arrival of Russian and British ships (under Adam Laxman and William Robert Broughton respectively), in 1799 the bakufu assumed direct control over eastern Ezo. Initially the bakufu was to be directly responsible for the area from Urakawa to the Shiretoko Peninsula, and the nearby islands, for a fixed term of seven years; however, since access to this region via Hakodate was still through Domain territory, this caused teething issues for both parties; and so, later that same year, the Domain was asked to relinquish also all the area east from the Shiriuchi River (知内川) on the Oshima Peninsula to Urakawa (i.e., including Hakodate). His domain thus greatly reduced, Matsumae Akihiro was compensated with the grant of lands in Musashi Province, in what is now Kuki, Saitama Prefecture, to the value of five thousand koku. In Kyōwa 2 (1802), the bakufu decided to take permanent control of eastern Ezo, establishing the Hakodate bugyō, the Matsumae clan receiving a gift of 3,500 ryō of gold in return.

In Bunka 2 (1805), learning that Nikolai Rezanov, on his return from Nagasaki, had met with officials of the Matsumae Domain and a number of Ainu, the bakufu sent out Tōyama Kagekuni (遠山景晋) to inspect the state of affairs in Matsumae and western Ezo. Taken ill upon his arrival in Matsumae that winter, he returned to Edo, journeying north again in 1806, his tour of inspection taking him from Matsumae to Sōya, before he returned to Edo once more. Concluding that the Matsumae Domain was unable to protect the northern borders, in 1807 the bakufu decided Matsumae Akihiro should hand back Matsumae and western Ezo, so as directly to control the entirety of Ezo. Matsumae Akihiro was consequently transferred to Yanagawa Domain in Mutsu province, in what is now Date, Fukushima Prefecture, the fief valued at 9,000 koku.

In Bunsei 4 (1821), Matsumae Akihiro was returned to his former fief in Ezo. The following year, he founded the Kiten-kan (徽典館) han school. Passing away in Tenpō 4 (1833), he was succeeded by his grandson Matsumae Yoshihiro, his son Chikahiro having died in 1827; another of Matsumae Akihiro's fourteen children, by more than one lady, Matsumae Takahiro, would later become the twelfth daimyō. Matsumae Akihiro's grave may be found amongst those of the other Matsumae daimyō at Hōdō-ji (法幢寺) in Matsumae.

Preceded by Matsumae Michihiro	Daimyō of Matsumae; 1792–1807; 1821–1833	Succeeded by Matsumae Yoshihiro

Preceded by none	Daimyō of Yanagawa; 1807–1821	Succeeded by none

== See also ==
- Sakoku
- Kakizaki Hakyō
- Vasily Golovnin
- Matsuura Takeshirō
