= Shinra no Kiroku =

1643 history book by Matsumae Kagehiro

Shinra no Kiroku (新羅之記録) or "Record of Shinra" is an early-Edo period Japanese domainal history. The chronicle is also known as Matsumae no Kuni Kiroku (松前国記録) or Shinra-ki (新羅記). It was compiled in 1643 by Matsumae Kagehiro (松前景広), the sixth son of Matsumae Yoshihiro, first daimyō of the Matsumae Domain (松前藩). Its two scrolls recount the early history of the Matsumae clan and describe the extension of Wajin influence over Ezo and encounters with the Ainu. The history is named after Shinra Saburō, an alias of Minamoto no Yoshimitsu, from whom the Matsumae clan claimed descent. The original text from 1643 is preserved in private hands in Okushiri and is the earliest extended record of Hokkaidō.

== See also ==
- List of Cultural Properties of Japan - writings (Hokkaidō)
- Koshamain's War
