= List of cultural properties of Japan – writings (Hokkaido) =

This list is of the cultural properties of Japan designated in the categories of calligraphic works and classical texts (書跡・典籍, shoseki tenseki) and ancient documents (古文書, komonjo) for the circuit of Hokkaido.

== National Cultural Properties ==
=== Calligraphic works and classical texts ===
As of 1 November 2016, one Important Cultural Property has been designated in the category of calligraphic works, being of national significance.

Property	Date	Municipality	Ownership	Comments	Image	Coordinates	Ref.
Kumano Kaishi by Emperor Go-Toba 後鳥羽天皇宸翰熊野懐紙〈山路眺望／暮里神楽〉 Go-Toba tennō shinkan Kumano gaishi	Kamakura period	Obihiro	private				

=== Ancient documents ===
As of 1 November 2016, zero Important Cultural Properties have been designated.

== Prefectural Cultural Properties ==
=== Writings ===
Property	Date	Municipality	Ownership	Comments	Image	Coordinates	Ref.
Notebooks of Chiri Yukie 知里幸恵ノート; Chiri Yukie nōto	Taishō era	Ebetsu	Hokkaido Prefectural Library (北海道立図書館)	four volumes		43°04′11″N 141°30′02″E	
Shinra no Kiroku 新羅之記録; Shinra no kiroku	1643	Okushiri	private	pair of scrolls			

== See also ==
- Cultural Properties of Japan
- List of National Treasures of Japan (writings: Chinese books)
- List of National Treasures of Japan (writings: Japanese books)
- List of National Treasures of Japan (writings: others)
- List of National Treasures of Japan (ancient documents)
- List of Cultural Properties of Japan - historical materials (Hokkaidō)
