= Ainu rebellion =

Ainu rebellion may refer to several wars between the Ainu and Wajin peoples in Japanese history:

- Koshamain's War (1457)
- Shakushain's revolt (1669–1672)
- Menashi–Kunashir rebellion (1789)
