= Takeda Nobuhiro =

Samurai of the Takeda clan

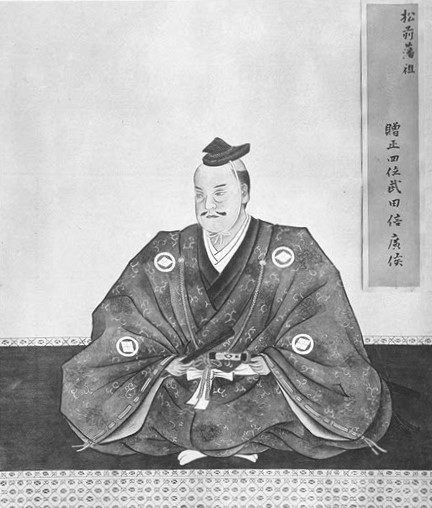
Portrait of Nobuhiro Takeda

Takeda Nobuhiro (武田 信広), also known as Kakizaki Nobuhiro (蠣崎 信廣) (1431 – 1494) was the ancestor of the Matsumae clan, and is celebrated for his role in suppressing the 1457 Ainu revolt of Koshamain. The adopted son of Takeda Nobukata, shugo (Governor) of Wakasa Province, he was later re-adopted by Kakizaki Sueshige. Some sources say he was originally of the Minabe clan.

== Life ==
Nobuhiro was born in Aoi castle in Obama, the capital of Wakasa province, and was called Hikotarō as a child. Though he was the older child, he was passed over as his father's heir for his younger brother Takeda Kuninobu, who had already himself produced a son. Nobuhiro was said to have been adopted, not a true blood relative, and became estranged from the family.

At the age of 21, he escaped Wakasa in the middle of the night, along with Takeda vassals Sasaki Shigetsuna, Sora Nakamura, Kudō Sukenaga and two others. They made their way towards the shogunal residence, but found that Minabe Mitsumasa had left. Moving to the territory of the Kakizaki clan, Nobuhiro adopted their surname as his own. A few years later, in 1454, he followed Andō Masasue to Hokkaidō (then called Ezo), and settled in the town of Kaminokuni. There, he came to be adopted by Kakizaki Sueshige, who named Nobuhiro his heir. Two years later, he sired a son named Kakizaki Mitsuhiro.

One of largest Ainu revolts in history, Koshamain's Revolt, occurred the following year, in 1457. Koshamain led a group of Ainu in a surprise attack on the samurai town, and Nobuhiro led a fierce counterattack along with Kakizaki Sueshige. The tide of battle turned a few times, but the samurai won in the end. Thus, Nobuhiro became one of the more famous and celebrated heroes in the Japanese history of Hokkaidō.

He built Katsuyama castle in 1462, and began to receive tribute from the Ainu of Sakhalin in 1475, though there was no possibility of the small number of samurai present effectively extending their control that far.

Nobuhiro died at the age of 64, in 1494. His descendants would continue to defend Japanese settlements in Hokkaidō from the natives. Around the year 1600, the family name was changed to Matsumae, and as the lords of Matsumae Domain, they headed shogunal relations with (and defense against) the Ainu until the late 19th century.

Hokkaidō was officially annexed following the Meiji Restoration. A few years later, when railroads began to be spread across the island, one of the first locomotives was named Nobuhiro after him.

== Related ==
- Yoru no Hikari Ryū
