= Matsumae Domain =

Japanese feudal domain located in Hokkaidō Province

Matsumae Domain 松前藩
- Domain of Japan
- 1590–1871
- Mon of the Matsumae clan

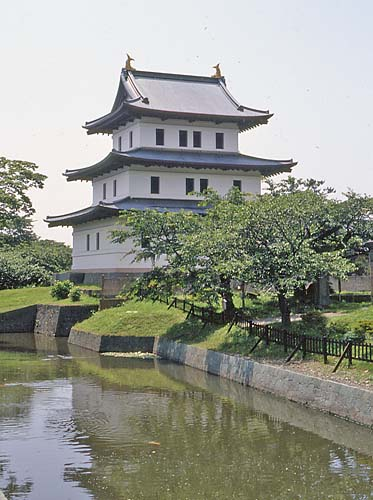
- Restored castle tower of Matsumae Castle
- Capital: Matsumae Castle
- Government
  - Type: Daimyō
- Historical era: Edo period
  - Established: 1590
  - Disestablished: 1871
- Today part of: Hokkaido

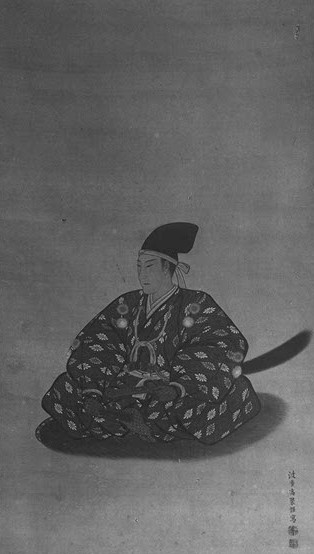
Matsumae Norihiro, the 13th next to last daimyo of Matsumae Domain

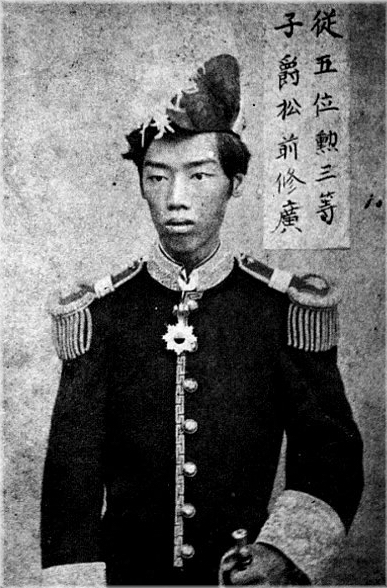
Matsumae Nagahiro, final daimyo of Matsumae Domain

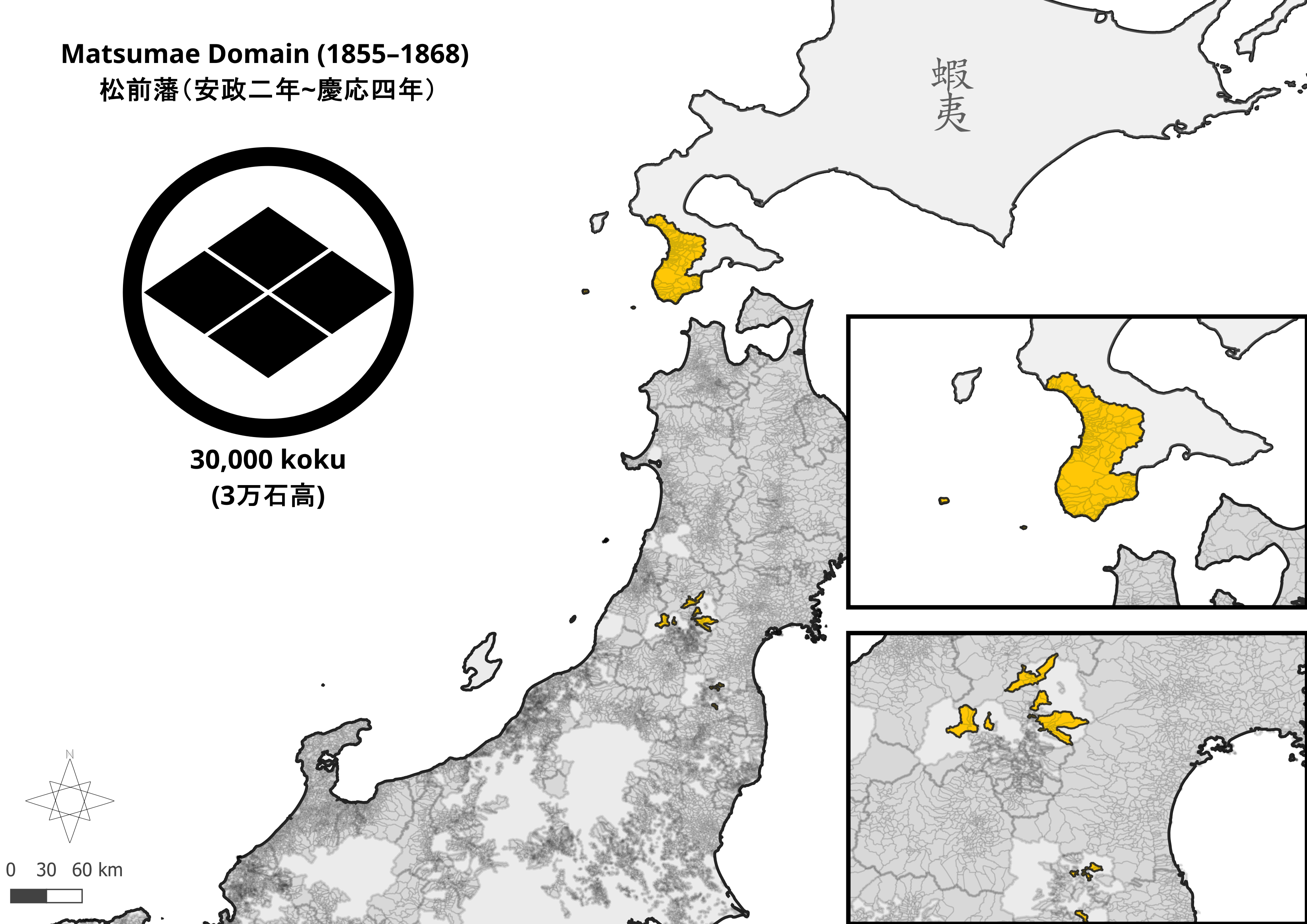
Matsumae Clan holdings and kokudaka

The Matsumae Domain (松前藩), a prominent domain during the Edo period, was situated in Matsumae, Matsumae Island (Ishijima), which is currently known as Matsumae Town, Matsumae District, Hokkaido, via Tsugaru District, Oshima Province. The clan's leader, also known as the lord of the domain, constructed Matsumae Fukuyama Castle in the same location and henceforth, the clan came to be referred to as the Fukuyama clan. In 1868, the castle was relocated to Tatejo in Assabu-cho, Hiyama-gun, within the territory, and was known as Tatehan during the Meiji period. Initially, the Matsumae clan's jurisdiction was limited to the Wajin territory on the Oshima Peninsula in southwest Hokkaido. However, they gradually expanded their control over the Ezo region, which is now part of Hokkaido, and transformed it into their domain. The clan's economic foundation relied on their exclusive trade with the Ainu people of Ezo, which set them apart from the agricultural-based governance principles of the Shogunate system. Towards the end of the Edo period, the shogunate often assumed control over Ezo.

== History ==
As per the historical account in the Matsumae domain's Shinra no Kiroku, Takeda Nobuhiro, believed to be a descendant of the Kai-Genji and Wakasa-Takeda clans, was the founder during the Muromachi period. Nobuhiro succeeded Kakizaki Suishige after having suppressed Koshamain's War, appointed by Masasue Ando as the shugo of Kamigoku, assumed the Kakizaki clan name, and settled in the southern part of the present-day Oshima Peninsula. Under Kakizaki Toshihiro's leadership, with the lord Ando Shunsuke, peace was established with the Ainu of Chikomotain and Hashitain, strengthening control over Ezo. Towards the end of the Sengoku period, Tamenobu Oura led an army in the Tsugaru region, resulting in the expulsion of the Ezo Kanrei (Hiyama Ando clan) from Tsugaru. This event hastened the Kakizaki clan's independence in the Ezo region. During Matsumae Yoshihiro's era, the son of Tokihiro, official separation from the Ando clan (later the Akita clan) was approved by submitting to Toyotomi Hideyoshi. In 1599, submission to Tokugawa Ieyasu led to the recognition of the right to rule over Ezo. In the early Edo period, the lord of Ezo Island was treated as a guest vassal, but during the fifth shogun Tsunayoshi Tokugawa's time, joining the Tokuyoriai resulted in being treated as a hatamoto. Additionally, from 1719, becoming a feudal lord with a rank of 10,000 koku marked a significant development in the history of the Matsumae domain's governance over Ezo. At the conclusion of the Sengoku period, Oura Tamenobu assembled a military force in the Tsugaru region, resulting in the expulsion of the Ezo Kanrei (Hiyama Ando clan) from Tsugaru. This event played a significant role in expediting the independence of the Kakizaki clan in the Ezo region. Under the leadership of Matsumae Yoshihiro, the son of Tokihiro, he gained official recognition for his separation from the Ando clan (later known as the Akita clan) by pledging allegiance to Toyotomi Hideyoshi. In 1599, he further solidified his position by submitting to Tokugawa Ieyasu, thereby securing the authority to govern over Ezo. Initially, during the early Edo period, he was regarded as a guest vassal and held the position of the lord of Ezo Island. However, during the reign of the fifth shogun, Tokugawa Tsunayoshi, he joined the Tokuyoriai and was elevated to the status of a hatamoto. Moreover, starting from 1719, he became a feudal lord with a substantial landholding of 10,000 koku.During that period, cultivating rice in Ezo was deemed unattainable, leading to the Matsumae clan holding a feudal lord position without a high rank. The designation of 10,000 koku as a rank came later on. The black seal bestowed upon Matsumae Yoshihiro by Ieyasu in 1604 granted the clan exclusive trading rights with the Emishi (Ainu people. Trade commodities like salmon, kelp, herring, and furs brought in revenue, reportedly amounting to 70,000 koku. The feudal lord himself dispatched trading vessels to Ezo, while his retainers were entrusted with the responsibility of establishing trading posts (akinaiba) in Ezo and authorizing them to send ships for trade. The Matsumae clan implemented a policy of regulating trade between Ezo and Wajin, designating the southern Oshima Peninsula as Wajinchi and the remaining area as Ezochi. Ainu individuals used to journey to Wajin territories and Honshu for trade until the early Edo period, after which control became more stringent. In 1679, the Matsumae clan established an anajinya in Kusharukotan (Kusukei, Odomari-cho, Odomari-gun) in Sakhalin, initiating the development of the region as a fishing hub. Fishing was the primary industry in Wajinchi, directly managed by the Matsumae clan, but due to dwindling herring catches, individuals began migrating to Ezo for employment opportunities. By 1834, the castle town of Matsumae had evolved into a thriving urban center with a populace exceeding 10,000 residents. Matsumae Nobuhiro, the 14th lord of the domain, submitted a request for the reinstatement of the domain name on June 24, 1869, and his request was approved. Subsequently, he was designated as the governor of the Matsumae domain. During that year, Hokkaido consisted of 86 districts across 11 provinces. The Matsumae Domain was established for a period of two years before it was transformed into a prefecture on July 14, 1871. Its name derived from the fact that the Imperial Court granted permission to construct a new castle in the village of Atsubu in the western region of the country. Initially, the government office was situated at Fukuyama Castle, as the construction of the new castle was interrupted by the Hakodate War. During the Boshin War and the Tohoku War, the Matsumae clan joined forces with the Ou-etsu clan alliance, but the loyalist Seigi-tai took control of the domain and defected to the new government. They relocated to the newly built Tate Castle and fought against the former shogunate army in the Hakodate War under the name of the Tate clan. Following the war, individuals who collaborated with the former shogunate army were apprehended and punished accordingly. Over 90 individuals, including both townspeople and samurai, faced punishment, with 19 of them being publicly executed.

== Holdings at the end of the Edo period ==
  - Oshima Province
- Erzhi County
- Hiyama-gun
- Tsugaru-gun
- Fukushima-gun
  - Mutsu Province
- Ryuhi Cape
- Iwashiro Province
- Date County - 10 villages
- Murayama County - 39 villages

== List of daimyo ==
#	Name	Tenure	Courtesy title	Court Rank	kokudaka
Matsumae clan, 1590 - 1871 (Fudai daimyo)
1	Matsumae Yoshihiro (松前慶広)	1590–1616	Shima no kami, Izu no kami (志摩守, 伊豆守)	Junior 5th Rank, Lower Grade (従五位下)	10,000 koku
2	Matsumae Kinhiro (松前公広)	1616–1641	Shima no kami (志摩守)	Junior 5th Rank, Lower Grade (従五位下)	10,000 koku
3	Matsumae Ujihiro (松前氏広)	1641–1648	None	Junior 5th Rank, Lower Grade (従五位下)	10,000 koku
4	Matsumae Takehiro (松前高広)	1648–1665	None	Junior 5th Rank, Lower Grade (従五位下)	10,000 koku
5	Matsumae Norihiro (松前矩広)	1665–1720	Shima no kami (志摩守)	Junior 5th Rank, Lower Grade (従五位下)	10,000 koku
6	Matsumae Kunihiro (松前邦広)	1720–1743	Shima no kami (志摩守)	Junior 5th Rank, Lower Grade (従五位下)	10,000 koku
7	Matsumae Sukehiro (松前資広)	1743–1765	Wakasa no kami (若狭守)	Junior 5th Rank, Lower Grade (従五位下)	10,000 --> 30,000 koku
8	Matsumae Michihiro (松前道広)	1765–1792	Mimasaka no kami (美作守), Shima no kami (志摩守)	Junior 5th Rank, Lower Grade (従五位下)	30,000 koku
9	Matsumae Akihiro (松前章広)	1792–1833	Wakasa no kami (若狭守)	Junior 5th Rank, Lower Grade (従五位下)	30,000 koku
10	Matsumae Yoshihiro (松前良広)	1833–1839	None	Junior 5th Rank, Lower Grade (従五位下)	30,000 koku
11	Matsumae Masahiro (松前昌広)	1839–1849	Shima no kami (志摩守)	Junior 5th Rank, Lower Grade (従五位下)	30,000 koku
12	Matsumae Takahiro (松前崇広)	1849–1865	Izu no kami (伊豆守)	Junior 5th Rank, Lower Grade (従五位下)	30,000 koku
13	Matsumae Norihiro (松前徳広)	1865–1868	Shima no kami (志摩守)	Junior 5th Rank, Lower Grade (従五位下)	30,000 koku
14	Matsumae Nagahiro (松前徳広)	1869–1871	None	Senior 4th Rank, Lower Grade (従五位下)	30,000 koku

== See also ==
- Shiranushi
- List of han
- Abolition of the han system
