= Oshima Province =

Former province of Japan

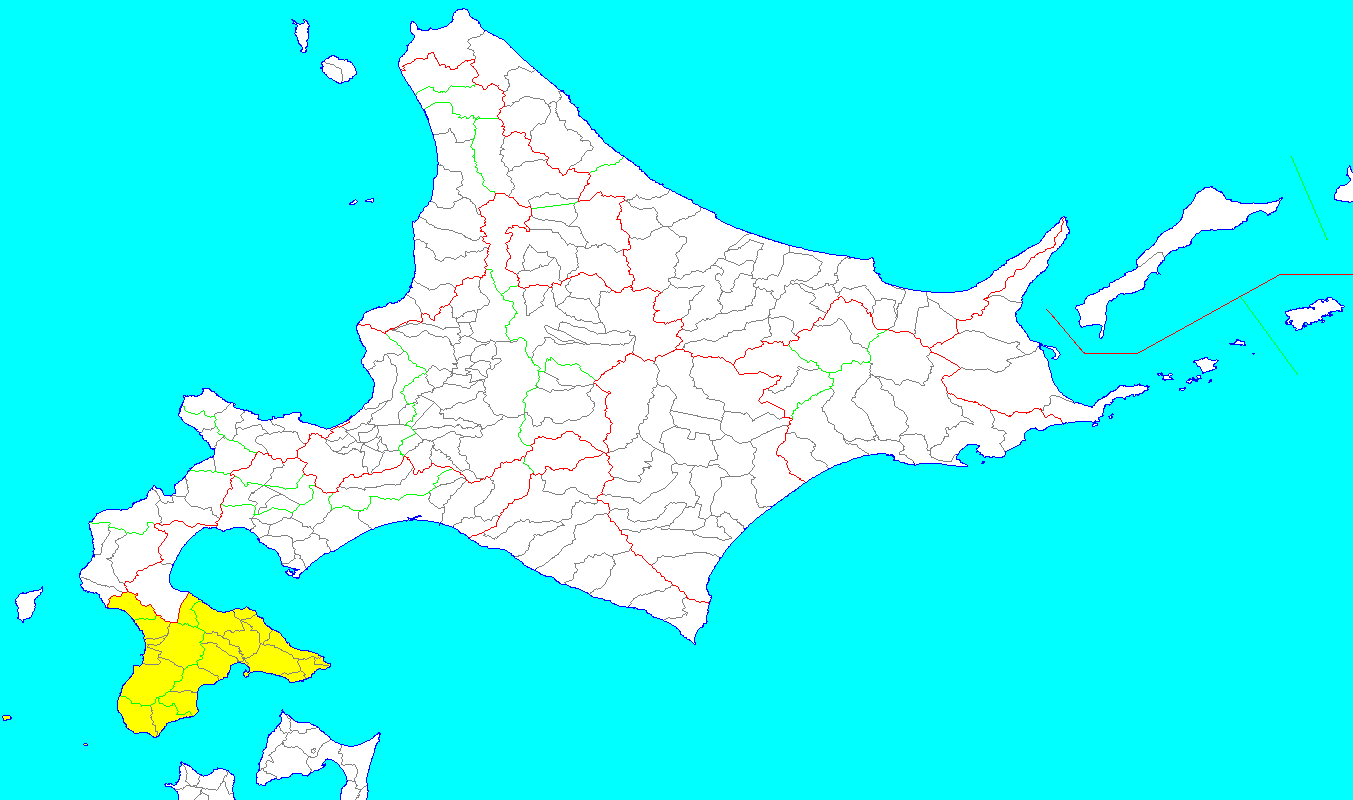
Location of Oshima Province c. 1869.

Oshima Province (渡島国, Oshima no Kuni; Japanese pronunciation: [ó̞.ɕì.mä̀ (nò̞ kɯ̈̀.ɲ̟ì)]) was a short-lived province located in Hokkaidō. It corresponded to the southern part of today's Oshima and Hiyama Subprefectures.

== History ==
After 1869, the northern Japanese island was known as Hokkaido; and regional administrative subdivisions were identified, including Oshima Province.

- August 15, 1869 Oshima Province established with seven districts
- 1872 Census reports 75,830 inhabitants of the province
- July, 1881 Tsugaru District and Fukushima District merged to form Matsumae District, reducing the number of districts to six.
- 1882 Provinces dissolved in Hokkaidō.

== Districts ==
- Kameda (亀田郡, -gun))
- Kayabe (茅部郡)
- Kamiiso (上磯郡)
- Fukushima (福島郡), merged with Tsugaru District in 1881 to form Matsumae District
- Tsugaru (津軽郡), merged with Fukushima District in 1881 to form Matsumae District
- Hiyama (檜山郡)
- Nishi (爾志郡)
