= Matsumae clan =

Japanese clan in Matsumae, Hokkaido

Matsumae clan 松前
- Banner with the crest (mon) of the Matsumae clan, from the collection of Heinrich von Siebold (Weltmuseum Wien)
- Home province: Matsumae, Hokkaido
- Parent house: Takeda clan
- Titles: Daimyō; Viscount
- Founding year: 1590

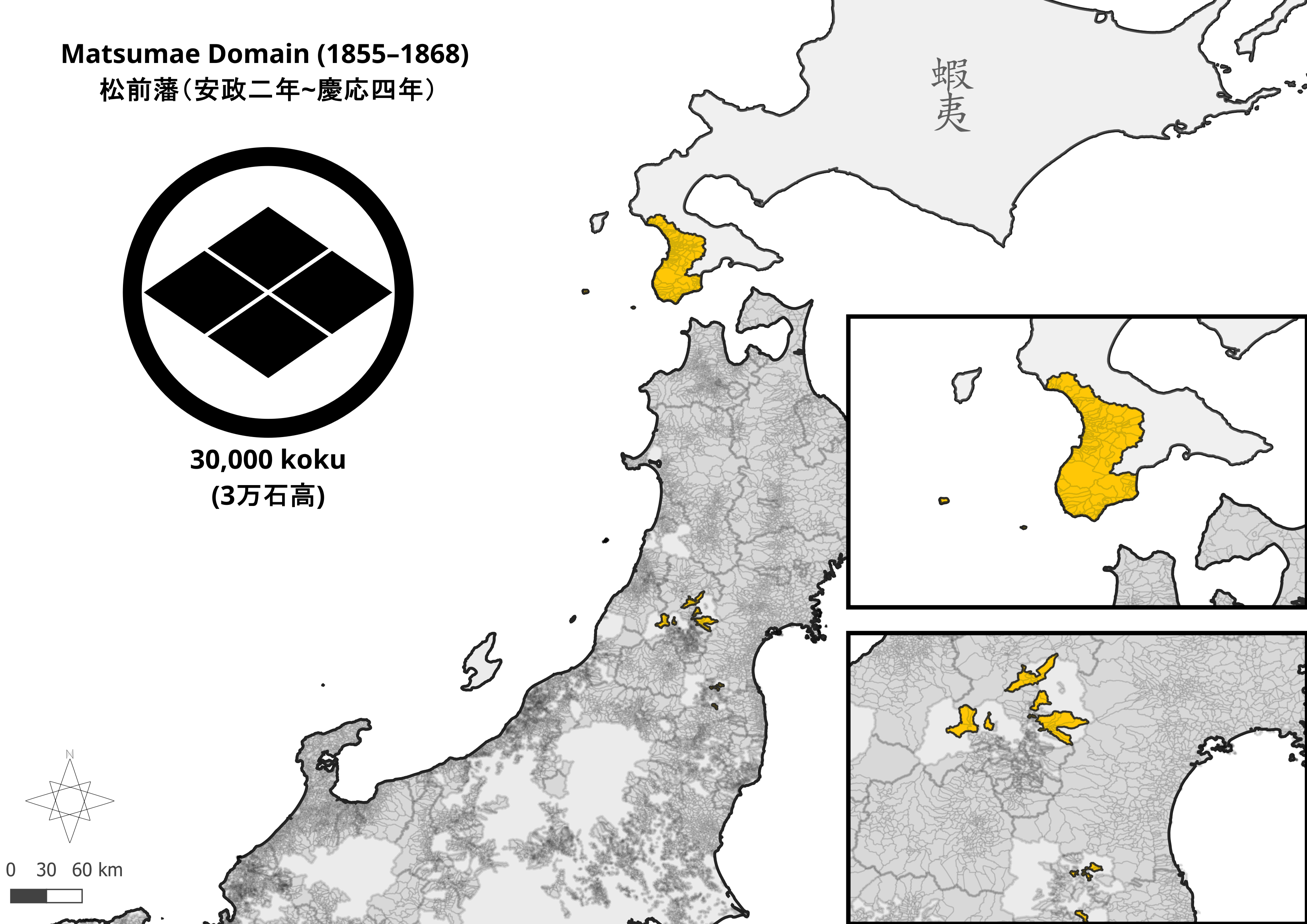
Matsumae clan holdings and kokudaka

The Matsumae clan (松前氏, Matsumae-shi) was a Japanese aristocratic family who were daimyo of the Matsumae Domain, now in Matsumae, Hokkaido, from the Azuchi–Momoyama period until the Meiji Restoration. They were given the march as their fiefdom in 1590 by Toyotomi Hideyoshi, and charged with defending it, and by extension the whole of Japan, from the Ainu "barbarians" of the north.

The Late Middle Japanese and Early Modern Japanese term for Hokkaido was Yezo, now pronounced Ezo; it was renamed only during the Meiji Restoration of 1868.

The Matsumae were the first Yamato people to negotiate with the Russian Empire. Following the Meiji Restoration, the family was bestowed the title of Viscount.

== History ==
The Matsumae, originally the Kakizaki clan (蠣崎氏, Kakizaki-shi)), had settled in Kakizaki, Kawauchi, Mutsu on the Shimokita Peninsula. Claiming descent from the Takeda clan of Wakasa Province, the family later took the name Matsumae.

Toyotomi Hideyoshi gave the Matsumae the area around what is now Matsumae, Hokkaidō as a march fief in 1590. They were charged with defending it and Mainland Japan from the non-Yamato peoples of the north. In exchange for their service in protecting the country, the Matsumae were made exempt from owing rice to the Tokugawa shogunate in tribute and from sankin-kōtai, which kept feudal lords and their families hostage in Edo to prevent rebellion.

Following the Meiji Restoration in 1868, the family was appointed the rank of viscount in the new kazoku peerage.

== Relations with the Ainu and Russia ==
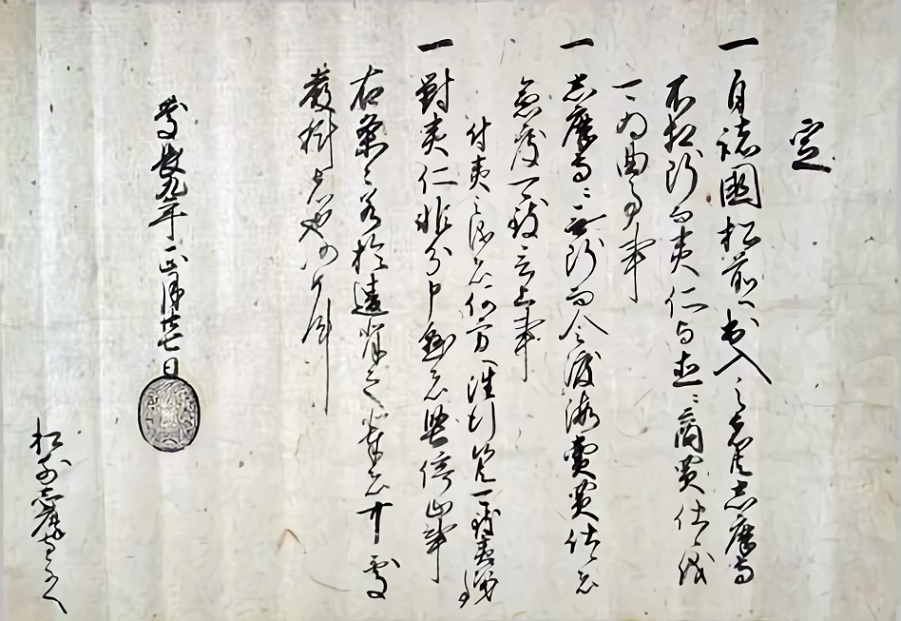
Black seal letter of 1604 from shogun Tokugawa Ieyasu to Matsumae Yoshihiro, first daimyō of the Matsumae Domain, granting the Domain exclusivity as intermediaries in trade with the people of Ezo (Hokkaido Museum)

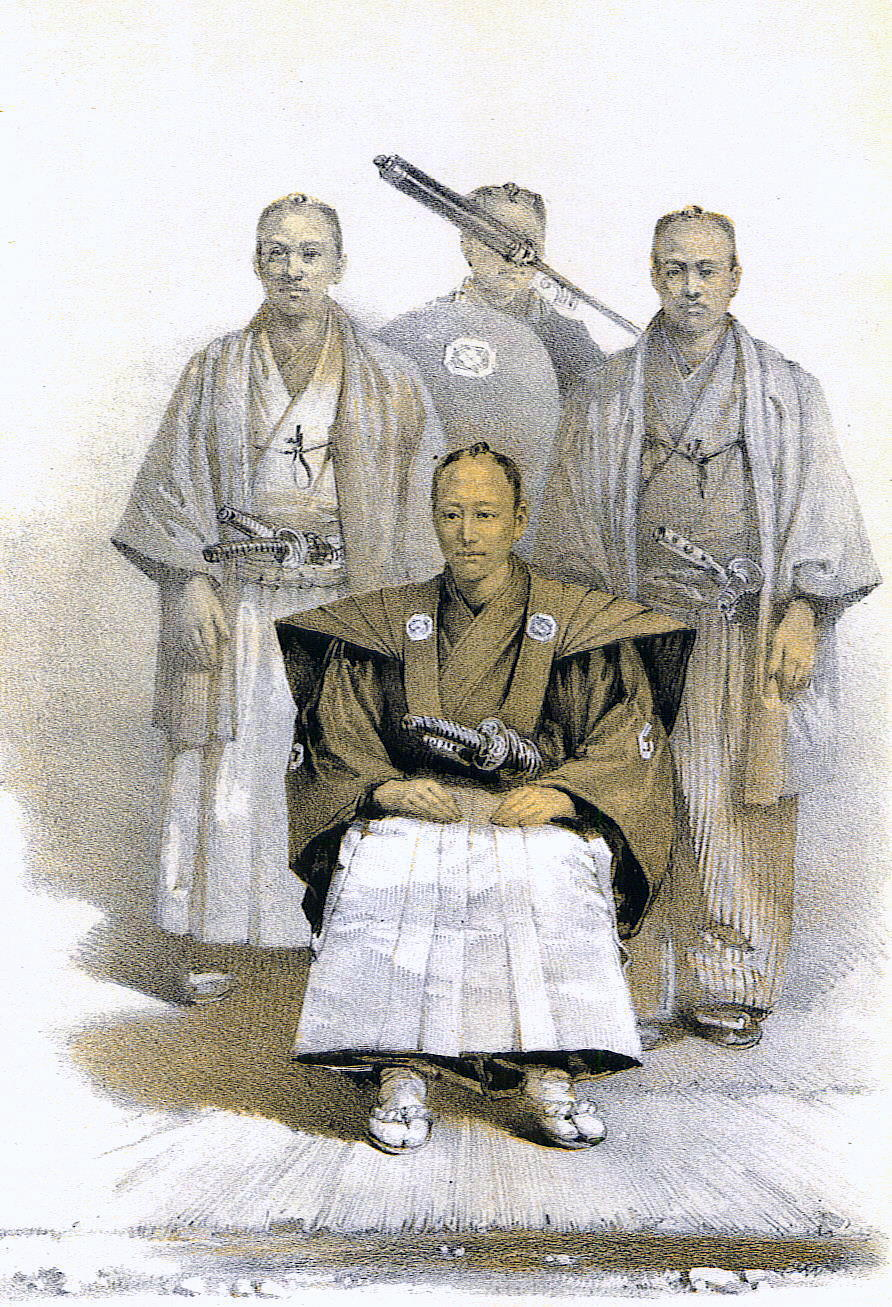
This 1856 print is entitled "Deputy of the Prince of Matsmay." This artist's impression of four samurai was among the images that were published after the Perry Expedition "opened the door" to Japan.

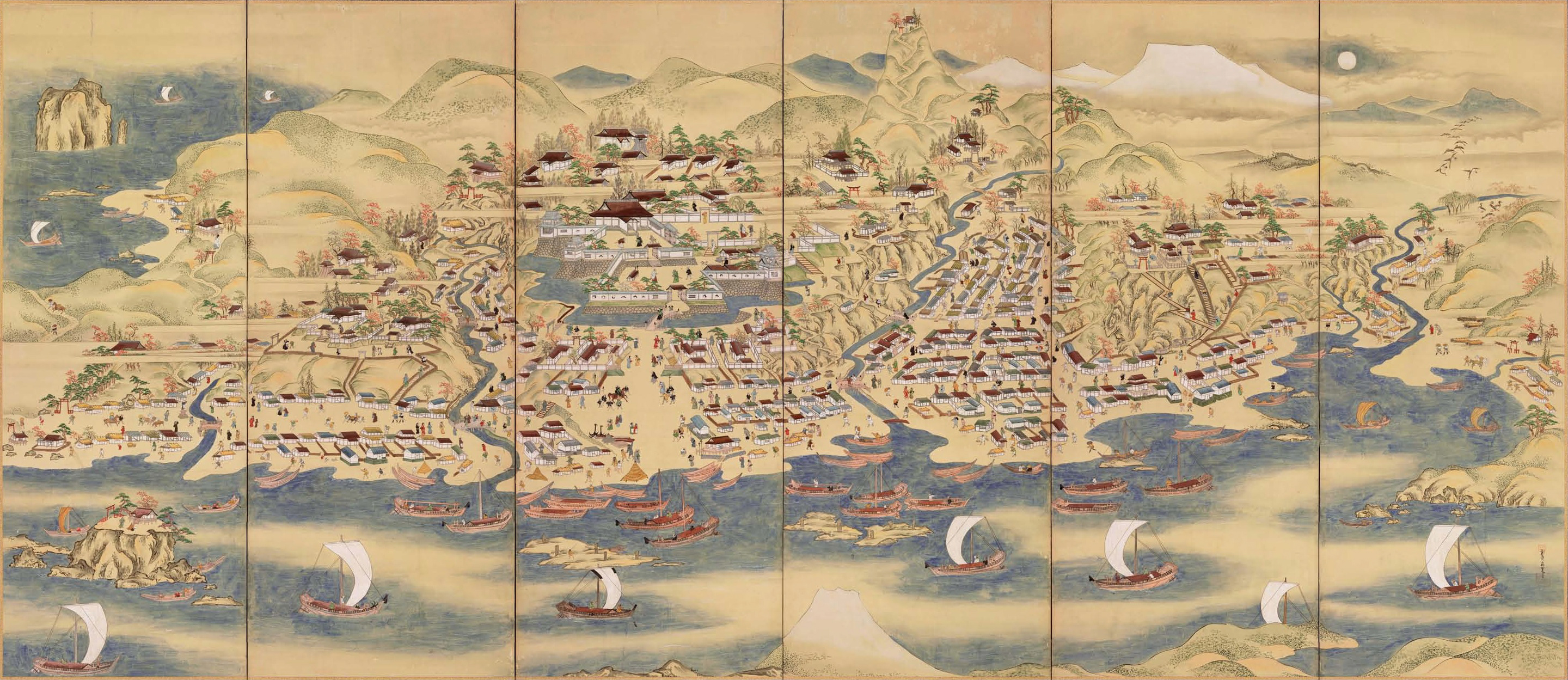
The Matsumae Folding Screen depicts in detail the castle town bustling with trade circa 1754–1764.

In the summer of 1779, a merchant from Yakutsk by the name of Pavel Lebedev-Lastochkin arrived in Ezo with a small expedition. He managed to reach a basho, or official Matsumae trading post for the Ainu, at Akkeshi on the easternmost point of the island. Here he was told no trade was possible except via the Ainu, and he and his crew sailed back to their exploratory base on Urup, an uninhabited island in the Kuril Islands to overwinter. However, Sakurajima erupted, and a related massive earthquake struck Hokkaidō. On January 19 1780, a tsunami deposited his ship, the Natalia, a quarter-mile inland. The survivors returned to Russian-controlled Kamchatka by Aleutian-style sea kayaks. He ceased further attempts to return to the Kurils and Hokkaido after Catherine the Great declared that the Ainu no longer had to pay the yasak, the Imperial fur tribute. The expanding Yamato colony was pushing the Ainu into the Kurils from their earlier territories in Sakhalin and Yezo (now Hokkaidō).

Palace reception near Hakodate in 1751. Ainu bringing gifts.

The Matsumae clan fief maintained extensive contacts with the Yezo Ainu and held exclusive rights to trade with their communities and to guarantee the security of Yamato interests there. Relations between the Matsumae and the Ainu were sometimes hostile, demonstrating that their power was not absolute in the region. In 1669, what began as a dispute over resources between rival Ainu clans escalated into a rebellion against Matsumae control. It lasted until 1672, when Shakushain's revolt was finally put down. The last serious Ainu rebellion was the Menashi-Kunashir rebellion in 1789.

In 1790, Kakizaki Hakyō painted Ishūretsuzō, a series of portraits of Ainu chiefs, to prove to the Mainland populace that the Matsumae were capable of controlling the northern borders and the Ainu. The 12 paintings of Ainu chiefs were exhibited in Kyoto in 1791.

At roughly the same time, in 1789, a Swedish Finn professor, Erik Laxmann, of the Russian Academy of Sciences, came across several Japanese castaways in Irkutsk. Like others before them, Russian sailors found them in the Aleutian Islands off the coast of Alaska and asked to be returned to Japan, but were instead transported to Saint Petersburg. Laxman saw their plight as an opportunity to work towards the opening of Japan, and suggested this to Catherine the Great, who agreed. In 1791, she appointed the professor's son, Adam Laxman, to command a voyage to repatriate the castaways and open discussions towards a trade agreement.

The expedition reached Hokkaidō in October 1792, and the Matsumae were hospitable. The Russians were allowed to spend the winter, and documents about them were sent to the bakufu in Edo. However, Professor Laxman insisted on bringing the castaways to Edo and said that he would sail there himself, even against the Shōgun's wishes. The bakufu sent envoys to the Matsumae, who requested that the Russians travel overland to Matsumae town. Sensing a trap, they refused and were eventually permitted to enter Hakodate by sea with a Japanese escort. They were assigned a guest house near Matsumae Castle and officially allowed to maintain their own customs. They did not have to deny Christianity despite a Shogunate ban on the religion, nor were they forced to remove their boots indoors, and they did not have to bow to the Shōgun's envoys.

The envoys gave them three swords and a hundred bags of rice, but also informed them that the Shōgun's rules remained unchangeable. Foreigners could trade only at Nagasaki in western Kyushu, and only if they came unarmed. All other ships would be subject to seizure. Laxman had been pardoned of this because he was returning castaways.

However, Laxman refused to relinquish them until he was given something in writing answering his trade request. The envoys returned three days later with a document restating the rules regarding trade at Nagasaki and the laws against the practice of Christianity. The Russians never established any regular system of trade at Nagasaki, and historians still disagree as to whether the document given to Professor Laxman was an invitation to trade or an evasive maneuver by the shogunate. The Russian expedition led by Adam Johann von Krusenstern and Nikolai Rezanov stayed for six months in the port of Nagasaki in 1804–1805, failing to establish diplomatic and trade relations with Japan.

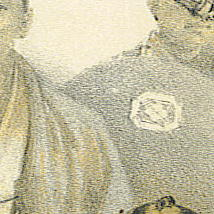
Cropped and enlarged segment of "Deputy of the Prince of Matsmay" (image at left). The detail of the Matsumae clan mon on the clothing of the standing figure in background looks like four diamond-shapes turned sideways.

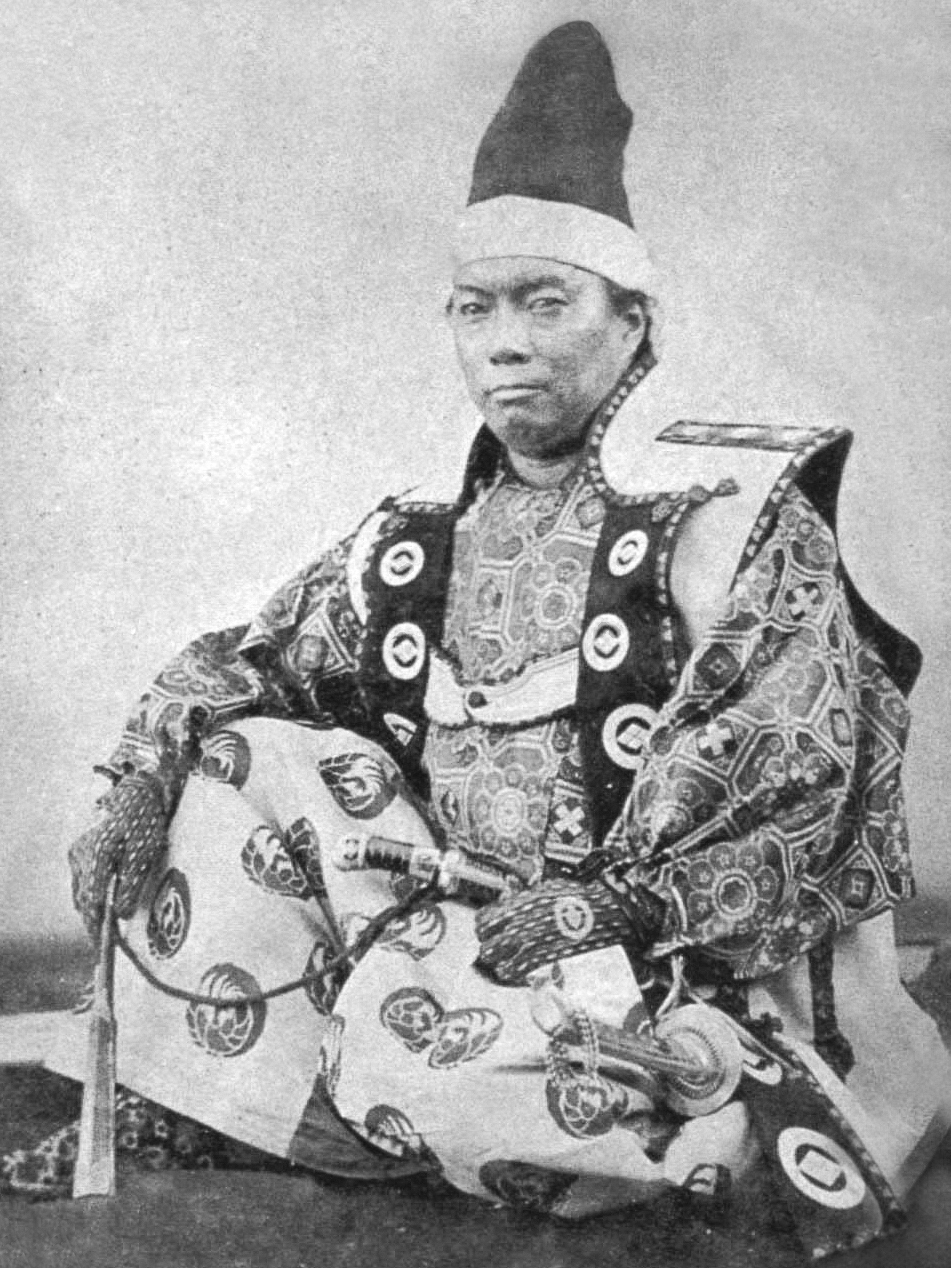
Matsumae Takahiro, a Matsumae lord of the late Edo period.

Since the Matsumae land was a march or borderland, the remainder of Yezo essentially became an Ainu reservation. Although Japanese influence and control over the Ainu gradually grew stronger over the centuries, at that time they were largely left to their own devices, and the shogunate did not regard their lands as Japanese territory. It was only during the Meiji Restoration in the late 19th century that the march was dissolved, and Hokkaidō was formally annexed and renamed.

== Kakizaki family heads ==
- Kakizaki Sueshige (蠣崎季繁), lord of Hanazawa-date; adoptive father of Takeda Nobuhiro, his general during Koshamain's War; by rallying the local leaders and heading the cause, he helped lay the foundations for the later Matsumae Domain.
- Kakizaki Mitsuhiro (蠣崎光広)
- Kakizaki Yoshihiro (蠣崎義広)
- Kakizaki Suehiro (蠣崎季広) (father of Matsumae Yoshihiro)

== Matsumae domain lords ==
The fourteen daimyō of the Matsumae Domain before the abolition of the han system in 1871 were:

- Matsumae Yoshihiro (–1616) (son of Kakizaki Suehiro)
- Matsumae Kinhiro (松前公広)
- Matsumae Ujihiro (松前氏広)
- Matsumae Takahiro (松前高広)
- Matsumae Norihiro (松前矩広)
- Matsumae Kunihiro (松前邦広)
- Matsumae Sukehiro (松前資広)
- Matsumae Michihiro (松前道広)
- Matsumae Akihiro (松前章広)
- Matsumae Yoshiro (松前良広)
- Matsumae Masahiro (松前昌広)
- Matsumae Takahiro (1849–1865)
- Matsumae Norihiro (松前徳広)
- Matsumae Nagahiro (松前修広)

== In popular culture ==
A fictionalized depiction of the Matsumae clan appears in the video game Ghost of Yōtei.

== See also ==
- Takeda Nobuhiro (1431–1494) (ancestor of the Matsumae clan)
- Yoru no Hikari Ryū
- Empire of Japan–Russian Empire relations
- Matsuura Takeshirō
