= Oshima Peninsula =

Southernmost part of Hokkaidō

Coordinates: 41°51′N 140°18′E

Location of Oshima Peninsula

The Oshima Peninsula (渡島 半島 Oshima-hantō) is the southernmost part of Hokkaidō, the northernmost of the Japanese islands. Where the peninsula starts is open to interpretation. A more generous interpretation is to draw a line southeast from Ishikari Bay across the Ishikari Plain to Yūfutsu District, Hokkaido. A narrower interpretation is to draw a line connecting Suttsu on the Sea of Japan and Oshamambe on Uchiura Bay. This narrow interpretation encompasses the subprefectures of Oshima and Hiyama.

At its southern end it forks into the southwest-pointing Matsumae Peninsula and the southeast-pointing Kameda Peninsula. These two peninsulas face Tsugaru and Shimokita Peninsulas of Honshū across the Tsugaru Strait. The Ōnuma Quasi-National Park is located on the peninsula.

The terrain of the peninsula is mountainous, with settlements mostly located in flat, lowland areas. Oshima Peninsula is home to several active volcanoes such as Mount E and Hokkaido Koma-ga-take. The area also contains several onsen hot springs. The peninsula is home to two cities: Hakodate and the smaller adjacent Hokuto, as well as numerous small fishing and agricultural towns.

Matsumae Castle, the northernmost castle in Japan and only castle on the island of Hokkaido, is located on the Oshima peninsula.

The climate is humid continental (Dfa/Dfb) except along the coast of the Matsumae Peninsula where it is oceanic (Cfb,) The hardiness zone is high for an east-coast Northern Hemisphere location at such a latitude and ranges up to 8b on the Matsumae.

== Ecology ==
Oshima Peninsula is separated from the rest of the island of Hokkaido by the Kuromatsunai Depression - an area of intensive agricultural development that forms a natural, northern boundary to the area. The peninsula has an active Ussuri brown bear population, which have historically caused major damages to livestock and crops, and thus have been indiscriminately hunted for over 120 years.
