= Matsumae Castle =

Castle in Hokkaido, Japan

Matsumae Castle 松前城
- Matsumae, Hokkaidō, Japan
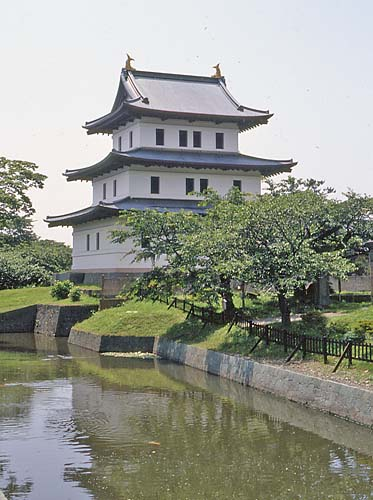

Site information
- Type: Hirajiro (flatland castle)
- Condition: The original gate to the inner citadel (itself a reconstruction) and remnants of the stone walls and embankments remain

Location
- Coordinates: 41°25′47″N 140°06′30″E
- Height: Three stories

Site history
- Built: 1606
- Built by: Matsumae clan
- In use: 1596 to Meiji Restoration
- Materials: Earth, stone, and wood
- Demolished: 1949

Matsumae Castle (松前城, Matsumae-jō) is a castle located in Matsumae, Hokkaido, Japan, and is the northernmost castle in Japan. The only traditional style Edo period castle in Hokkaidō, it was the chief residence of the han (estate) of the Matsumae clan.

== History ==
First built in 1606 by daimyo Matsumae Yoshihiro under orders from the Tokugawa shogunate, which required his clan to defend the area, and by extension the whole of Japan, from the Ainu "barbarians" to the north. It burned down in 1637 but was rebuilt in 1639. It once controlled all passage through Hokkaidō to the rest of Japan.

The present castle complex, which dates from 1854, was constructed to deter attacks by foreign naval forces. Only the 30-metre-high tenshu (main tower) and a gatehouse survived destruction following the Meiji Restoration, which began in 1868. However, the tenshu burned down in 1949 and a concrete replica was built in 1960.

Today, the castle site is now a public park.

== Festivals ==
Approximately 8,000 cherry trees are planted in Matsumae Park, which is approximately 150,000 m^{2} around the site of Matsumae Castle. More than 200,000 people visit the Matsumae Sakura Festival every spring to see cherry blossoms.

Since 1984, the "Matsumae Castle Age Festival" has been held in August.

== See also ==
- Goryōkaku – a star fort constructed in the Bakumatsu era
