= Ezo =

Historical term for the islands north of Japan and their people

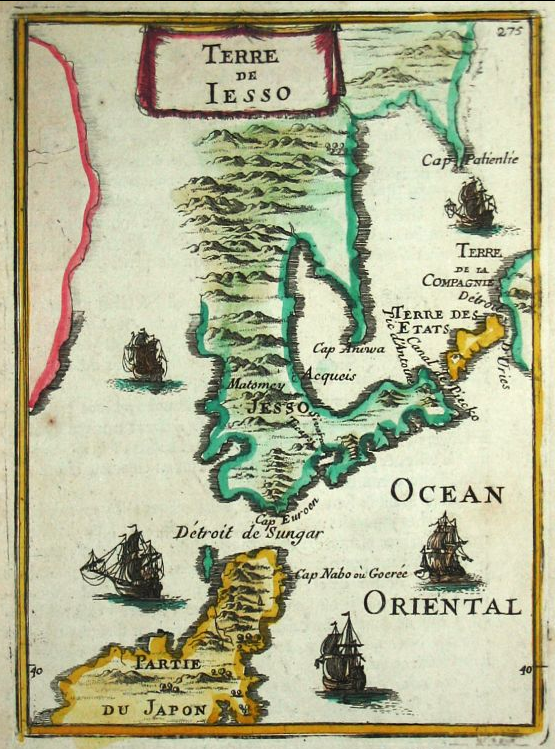
Map of the "Land of Iesso" by French cartographer Alain Manesson Mallet (1683)

Ezo, Yezo or Yeso (蝦夷; Japanese pronunciation: [eꜜ.(d)zo]) is the Japanese term historically used to refer to the people and the lands to the northeast of the Japanese island of Honshu. This included the northern Japanese island of Hokkaido, which changed its name from "Ezo" to "Hokkaidō" in 1869, and sometimes included Sakhalin and the Kuril Islands.

In reference to the people of that region, the same two kanji used to write the word Ezo can also be read Emishi. The descendants of these people are most likely related to the Ainu people of today.

== Etymology ==
Japanese sources that include an etymology describe Ezo as probably originally a borrowing from the Ainu word enciw meaning 'person; people'. The term is first attested in Japanese in a text from 1153 in reference to any of the non-Japanese people living in the northeast of Honshū, and then later in 1485 in reference to the northern islands where these people lived, primarily Hokkaido, Karafuto (i.e. Sakhalin), and the Kuril Islands.

The kanji spelling is based on the meanings of the characters rather than the phonetics (jukujikun), and is composed of the characters 蝦 meaning 'shrimp, lobster' and 夷 meaning 'barbarian'. The use of the character for 'shrimp, lobster' might be in reference to the long "whiskers" (antennae) of these animals, alluding to the prominent beards worn by Ainu men.

The spelling Yezo reflects its pronunciation c. 1600, when Europeans first came in contact with Japan. It is this historical spelling that is reflected in the scientific Latin term yezoensis, as in Fragaria yezoensis and Porphyra yezoensis. However, there are species that use a different spelling, such as the Japanese scallop known as Mizuhopecten yessoensis (帆立貝, hotategai).

== History ==
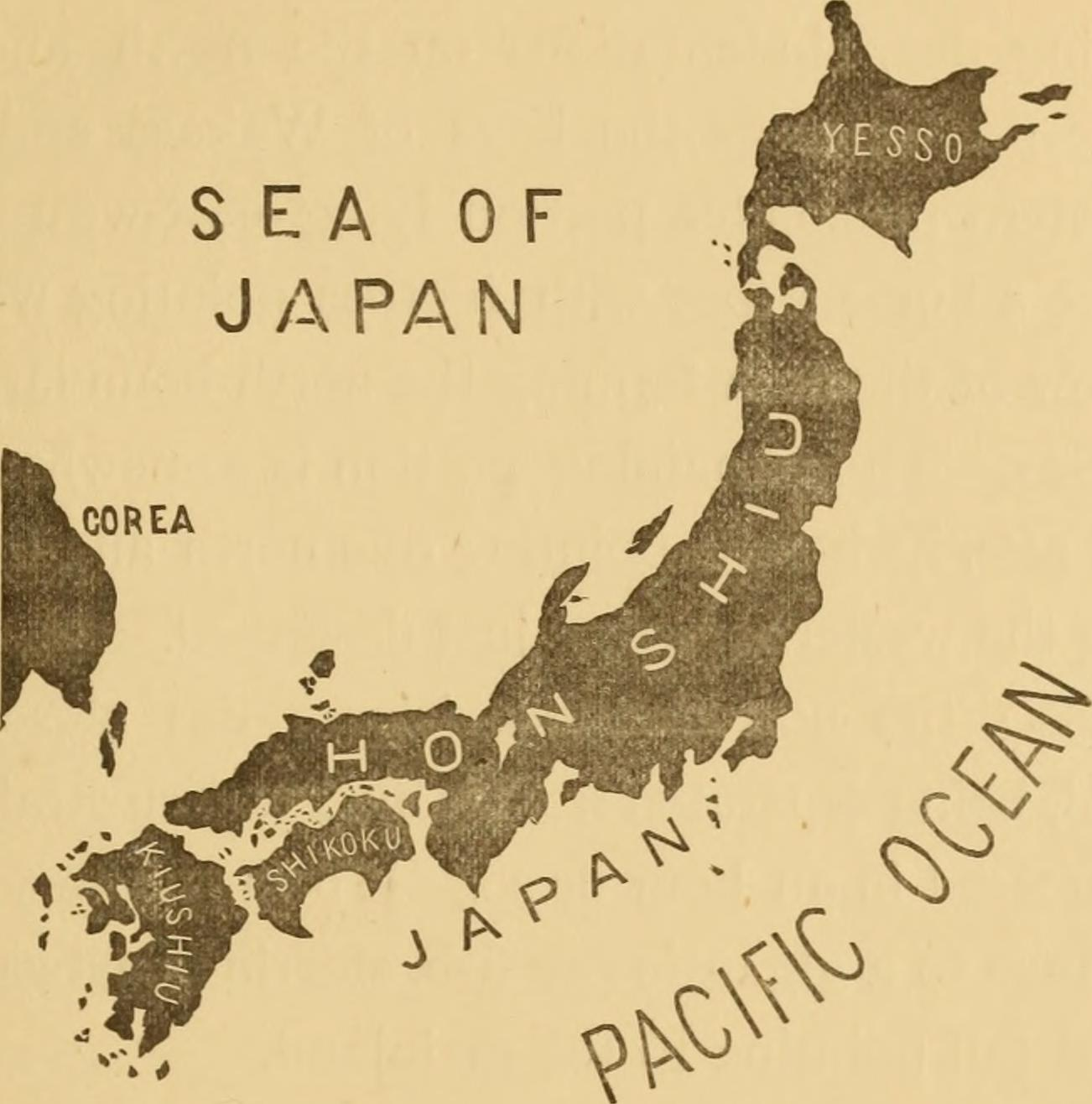
1888 map of Japan, with Hokkaido labelled "Yesso"

The first published description of Ezo in the West was brought to Europe by Isaac Titsingh in 1796. His small library of Japanese books included Sangoku Tsūran Zusetsu (三国通覧図説, An Illustrated Description of Three Countries) by Hayashi Shihei. This book, which was published in Japan in 1785, described the Ezo region and its people.

In 1832, the Oriental Translation Fund of Great Britain and Ireland supported the posthumous abridged publication of Titsingh's French translation of Sankoku Tsūran Zusetsu. Julius Klaproth was the editor, completing the task which was left incomplete by the death of the book's initial editor, Jean-Pierre Abel-Rémusat.

== Subdivisions ==
Ezo (蝦夷) or Ezogashima (蝦夷ヶ島) (lit. 'Island of the Ezo') was divided into several districts. The first was the Wajinchi, or 'Japanese Lands', which covered the Japanese settlements on and around the Oshima Peninsula. The rest of Ezo was known as the Ezochi (蝦夷地) (lit. 'Ezo-land'), or 'Ainu Lands'. There were also Japanese people who moved from other places to the coastal areas of Ezochi. Ezochi was in turn divided into three sections: North Ezochi, which covered southern Sakhalin; West Ezochi, which included the northern half of Hokkaidō; and East Ezochi, which included the populous southern and eastern Hokkaidō and the Kuril Islands.

== See also ==
- Ainu people
- Emishi
- Republic of Ezo
- Jeddo, Japan, a former romanization of the name of Edo, now Tokyo
