= Ishūretsuzō =

Series of twelve painted portraits by Kakizaki Hakyō

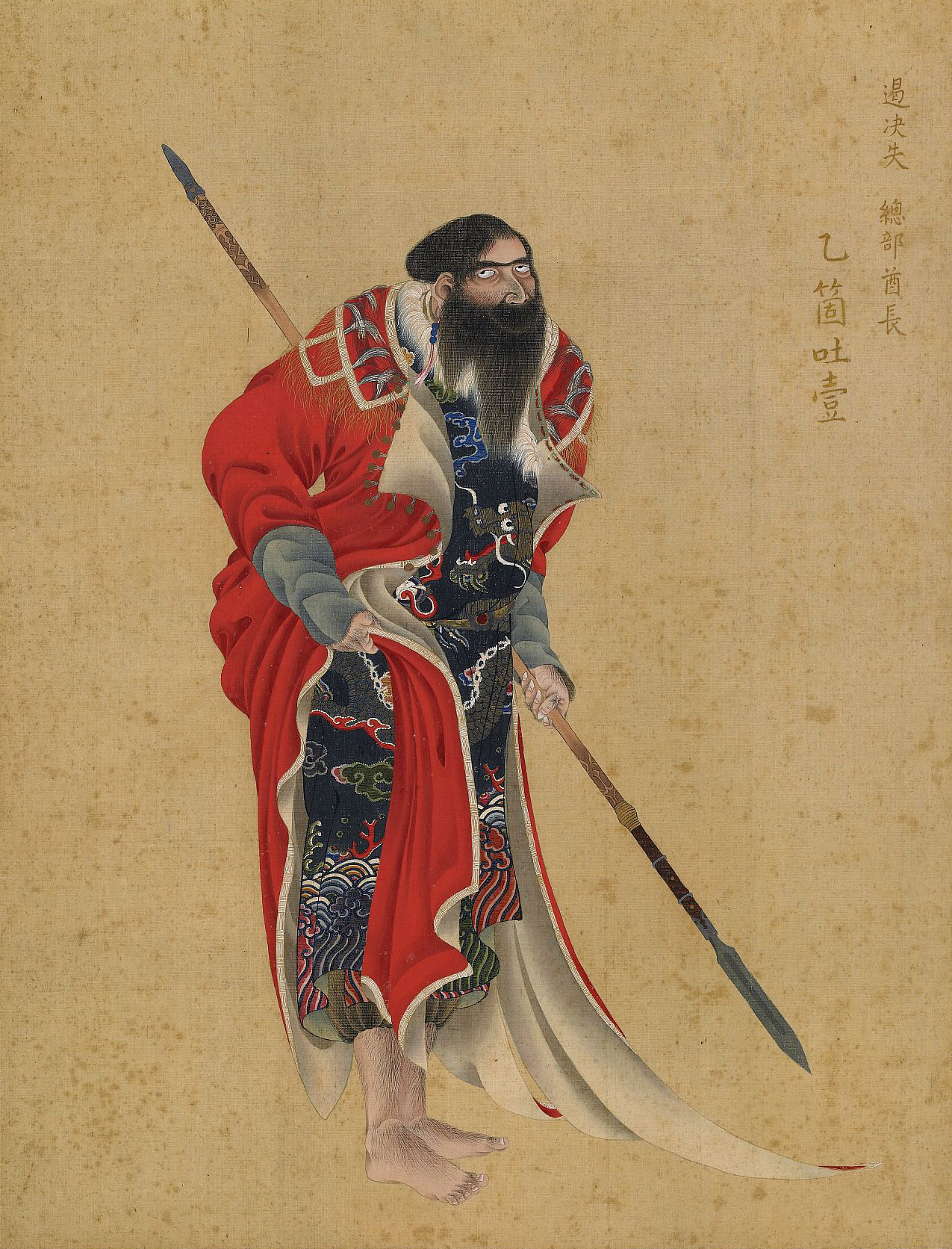
Ikotoi, chief of Akkeshi, depicted with blue bead earrings, plain skin trousers, an Ezo-nishiki Chinese silk robe with dragons and clouds, and a Russian military greatcoat

Ishūretsuzō (夷酋列像), also known as or A Series of Paintings of Ainu Chieftains or Portraits of Ezo Chieftains, is a series of twelve painted portraits, dating to 1790, of Ainu elders in the aftermath of the Menashi–Kunashir rebellion. They are by the Japanese artist and Matsumae Domain retainer Kakizaki Hakyō (1764–1826). Eleven of the twelve original paintings survive and are in the collection of the Musée des Beaux-Arts et d'Archéologie de Besançon. A number of preparatory drawings and copies are to be found in collections in Japan. The clothing worn and other accoutrements depicted help cast light on late eighteenth-century connections between the indigenous inhabitants of Ezochi, the Wajin, China, and Russia. The portrait of Ininkari from the series also represents the earliest known documentation of brown bears (Ursus arctos) with white pelage, the so-called "Ininkari bears" that are to be found on Kunashir (Kunashiri) and Iturup (Etorofu) in the disputed Southern Kurils.

== Historical background ==
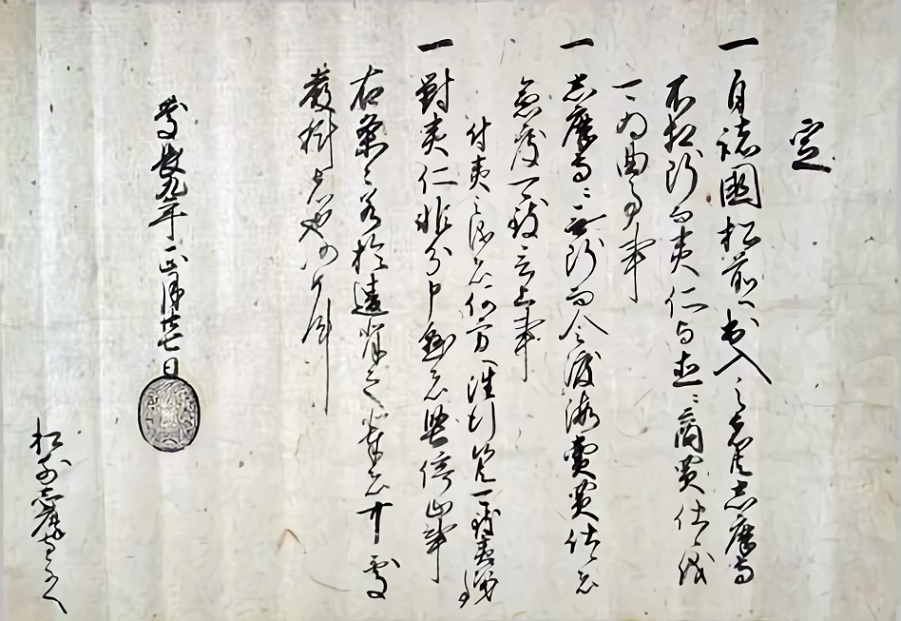
Black seal letter of 1604 from shogun Tokugawa Ieyasu to Matsumae Yoshihiro, first daimyō of Matsumae Domain, granting the Domain exclusivity as intermediaries in trade with the people of Ezo (Hokkaido Museum)

In 1604, the Tokugawa shogunate granted the Matsumae Domain exclusivity in trade with the people of Ezo. From the 1630s, these exchanges were managed through the so-called akinaiba chigyo sei [ja] trade-fief system, which saw Ezochi demarcated into a number of trading posts (known as akinaiba or basho), each assigned to a senior vassal of the Matsumae clan, with exclusive rights to trade with the local Ainu. Following Shakushain's revolt and during the eighteenth century, this was gradually replaced by the basho ukeoi sei [ja] or subcontracted trading post system, with Japanese merchants granted rights to manage local trade on behalf of the Matsumae clan vassals, in exchange for commission. The outcome was loss of economic independence, as the Ainu increasingly became in effect labourers in fisheries and other businesses operated by Wajin merchants.

In 1788, merchant Hidaya Kyūbei (飛騨屋久兵衛) began commercial fishing operations in the Menashi-Kunashiri area, employing Ainu workers to catch salmon and trout for use as fertilizer. Worked so hard that they had insufficient time to lay up food for the winter, food shortages combined with overbearing behaviour — including fishery supervisors making Ainu wives their mistresses — and suspicions of poisonings sparked the Menashi–Kunashir rebellion of May 1789. While local potentate Tsukinoe was away hunting sea otters on Uruppu, seventy-one Wajin were killed, twenty-two of them on Kunashiri, the rest in the Menashi area, all but one of them (a Matsumae Domain soldier) Hidaya employees. When news reached Matsumae at the beginning of June, daimyō Matsumae Michihiro despatched 260 soldiers, who made their way east, recruiting local Ainu chieftains as they went. Arriving in the Nemuro area in July, over three hundred of those involved surrendered, and of the thirty-eight directly involved in the killings — including Tsukinoe's son Seppayabu — all but one (who had fled) were beheaded, their heads stored in salt. In the aftermath, Matsumae Michihiro commissioned the Ishūretsuzō series of portraits of twelve elders who had helped suppress the revolt.

== Ethnographic detail and otherness ==
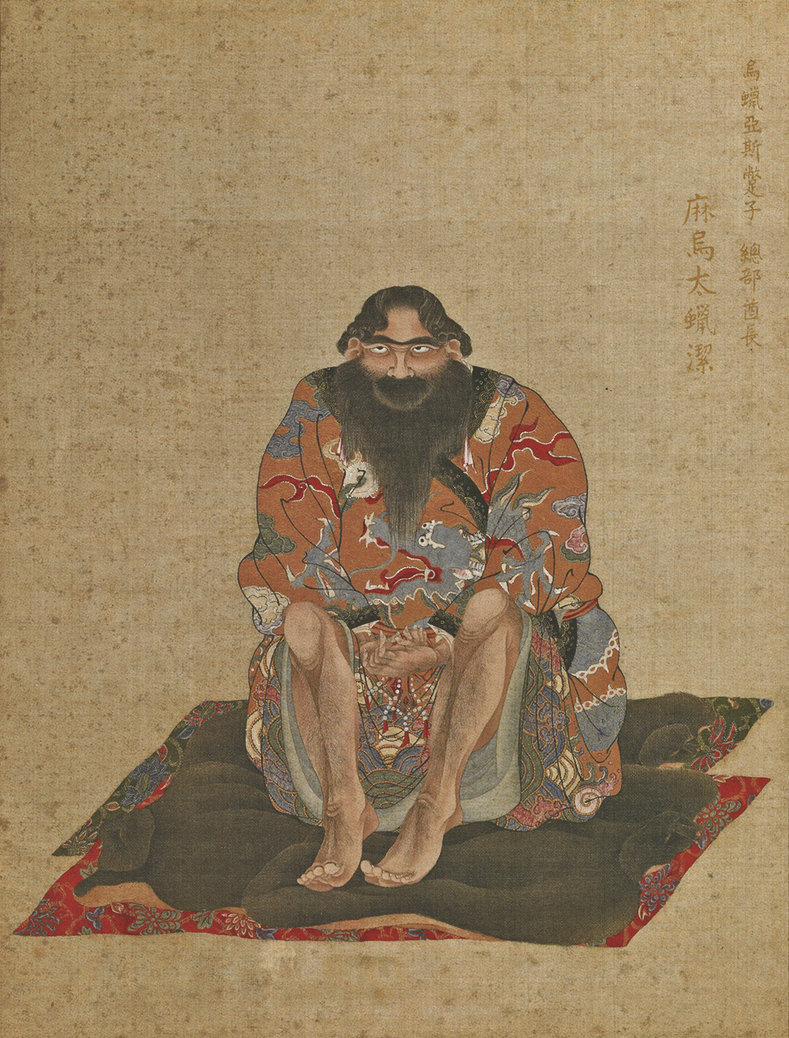
Mautarake, with a beard, unbound hair, synophrys, sanpaku eyes, large ears and nose, and a hairy body; his robe is wrapped right over left

As was common in contemporary Ainu genre painting, the Ainu elders are depicted with stereotyped physiognomic and bodily deviations that emphasize their alterity, in particular hairiness — beards, unbound hair, hairy hands, hairy legs, hairy feet, a synophrys — also large noses and ears, and "sinister" sanpaku eyes. Moreover, their robes are wrapped right over left — known as "sajin" (左衽) — a manner historically regarded as barbaric in the Sinosphere. A wealth of ethnographic detail further emphasizes their "foreignness", including Ainu bark cloth attus robes, with ayus thorn patterns; tekunpe (テクンぺ) mittens; boots of seal skin; cloth and blue bead earrings; a ritual hoe-shaped helmet ornament (ペラウシトミカムイ); a shitoki necklace; a female mouth tattoo; Ezo nishiki Qing robes; Russian coats; and western-style shoes.

== Series ==
Elder	Comments	Preparatory sketch	Finished painting
Mautarake (麻烏太蠟潔), chieftain of Urayasubetsu	with his sanpaku eyes, he sits on bear or sea otter skins, his Ezo nishiki robe — with dragons, clouds, and waves, worn right over left — rides up, revealing his hairy legs; in his hands is an item of jewellery with tassels and beads		
Chousama (超殺麻), chieftain of Urayasubetsu	with European stockings and shoes under his fur-lined Ezo nishiki robe, he wears blue bead and cloth tassel earrings and holds a hoe-shaped helmet ornament (as does the chieftain Tobu in Kakizaki Hakyō's 1783 portrait (see Gallery below))		
Tsukinoe (貲吉諾), chieftain of Kunashiri	with a Russian military greatcoat over his Ezo nishiki robe, worn right over left, and long mittens, he sits on a low chair fitted with a bearskin		
Shonko (贖穀), chieftain of Nokkamappu	stroking his beard and with long mittens, an emusat (エムㇱアッ) sword holder is visible below his Ezo nishiki robe		
Ikotoi (乙箇吐壹), chieftain of Akkeshi	with a spear and bare-legged, he wears a Russian greatcoat over his Ezo nishiki robe		
Shimochi (失莫窒), chieftain of Akkeshi	out hunting with a small bow and some of his quarry tucked into his belt, he wears a skin jacket over his Ezo nishiki robe and thorn-pattern leggings		
Ininkari (乙唫葛律), chieftain of Akkeshizarasan	with spear, makiri [ja], tobacco case, and mittens, he leads two bear cubs, one a so-called "Ininkari bear"		
Nochikusa (訥窒狐殺), chieftain of Shamo-kotan	with headband, tashiro sword, tobacco case, and pipe, he lifts aloft a deer		
Poroya (卜羅鵶), chieftain of Bekkai	wearing an attus over his Ezo nishiki robe, barefoot, and walking a dog, he has a tobacco case and tashiro sword		
Ikorikayani (乙箇律葛亞泥), son of Tsukinoe	carrying two waterfowl after a successful hunt, he is armed with a bow, quiver and tashiro sword (Copy made by Watanabe Hiroteru and located at the Hokkaido Museum, the original is lost)		
Nishikomake (泥湿穀末決), chieftain of Akkeshi	stringing his bow, he has a quiver and seal-skin boots		
Chikiriashikai (窒吉律亞湿葛乙), mother of Ikotoi	with lip tattoo and shitoki necklace, she is seated on a Korean tapestry		

== Versions, copies, and related documents ==
- Ishūretsuzō funpon (夷酋列像粉本) — two sets of preparatory sketches on paper, comprising: (a) thirteen sheets, nine of which are understood to be in the hand of Kakizaki Hakyō (those above of Mautarake, Tsukinoe, Shonko, Ikotoi, Ininkari, Nochikusa, Poroya, Nishikomake, and Chikiriashikai), with two different versions of Ininkari and three different versions of Tsukinoe, but lacking portraits of Ikorikayani and Shimochi, and with that of Chousama understood not to be Kakizaki Hakyō; in Hakodate City Central Library and designated a Prefectural Tangible Cultural Property; (b) three sheets, featuring Chousama, an early draft of Ikotoi, and another early draft of Tsukinoe, in a private collection
- Ishūretsuzō (夷酋列像) — the finished 1790 series, in the Musée des Beaux-Arts et d'Archéologie de Besançon, comprising (a) eleven lengths of silk each with a painted portrait (that of Ikorikayani is missing) in the hand of Kakizaki Hakyō, fifth son of the seventh daimyō of Matsumae Domain Matsumae Sukehiro, and (b) twenty-one lines of prefatory text, over two lengths of silk, in the hand of Matsumae Hironaga, fifth son of sixth daimyō Matsumae Kunihiro; of uncertain provenance, but catalogued in 1933 and identified as being by the artist in 1984
- Ishūretsuzō furoku (夷酋列像附録) — a lengthy historical appendix in ink on paper in two versions, referred to as the hiragana edition and the katakana edition, by Matsumae Hironaga and dated Kansei 2 (1790); the katakana edition is in the Northern Studies Collection, Hokkaido University Library
- Gomikata Ezo no zu (御味方蝦夷之図) — two lengths of silk, with portraits of Ikotoi and Shonko; of uncertain date, but understood to be in Kakizaki Hakyō's hand; handed down within the Matsumae clan and now in Hakodate City Central Library
- Ishūretsuzō eiran monsho (夷酋列像叡覧文書) — ink on paper, a 1791 document sent by Sasaki Nagahide to Kakizaki Hakyō on the occasion of the Ishūretsuzō being offered up for inspection by Emperor Kōkaku; in Hakodate City Central Library
- Ezo zuzō (蝦夷図像) — two scrolls on paper dating to 1799, comprising copies by an unknown artist of the preface and of all twelve images, from the originals, borrowed by Matsura Seizan, ninth daimyō of Hirado Domain, from Matsumae Michihiro, eighth daimyō of Matsumae Domain; at Matsura Historical Museum
- Ezo zuzō betsuroku (蝦夷図像別録) — a single volume paper copy of uncertain date of the katakana edition of Matsumae Hironaga's appendix; at the National Museum of Ethnology
- Ishūretsuzō zu (夷酋列像図) — two scrolls on paper totalling over sixteen metres and dating to 1798–1829, with copies of all twelve portraits and of the hiragana edition of Matsumae Hironaga's appendix, with the text in the hand of Matsudaira Sadanobu, third daimyō of Shirakawa Domain in southern Mutsu Province and rōjū at the time of the Kunashiri-Menashi Rebellion; his access to the originals may have been facilitated by the transfer of ninth daimyō Matsumae Akihiro to the nearby Yanagawa Domain from 1807 to 1821, in response to the arrival in the north of the Russians under Laxman and the British under Broughton; at the National Museum of Ethnology
- Shimochi zō (シモチ像) — portrait of Shimochi of 1802, colour on silk, by Kakizaki Hakyō; a different version from the portrait in the Ishūretsuzō series; private collection
- Ishūretsuzō (夷酋列像 (模写)) — copy on silk, dating to 1804, of the portraits of Chikiriashikai, Ikorikayani, Ininkari, Nishikomake, Nochikusa, and Poroya, by Watanabe Hiroteru (渡辺広輝), who studied under goyō-eshi Sumiyoshi Hiroyuki and became official painter to the Tokushima Domain; private collection, deposited at the Hokkaido Museum
- Ishū jūninin zuzō (夷酋一十二人図像写) — copy on paper, dating to later than 1824, of the same six portraits as in the entry above, by Morizumi Tsurana, a pupil of Watanabe Hiroteru; at Tokushima Prefectural Museum
- Ishūretsuzō (夷酋列像 (模写)) — copy on silk of 1843 of all twelve portraits and the preface, and with an afterword, by samurai of Hiroshima-Shinden Domain and Nanpin school painter Kojima Sessō (小島雪崝); fifth daimyō Asano Nagamichi is understood to have borrowed the originals from the Matsumae Domain; private collection
- Ezo-jin zu (蝦夷人図) — hanging scroll on silk from the first half of the nineteenth century, with Nishikomake and Shimochi together in a snowy mountain landscape, by Takahashi Namiai (高橋波藍), a pupil of Kakizaki Hakyō; understood to have been gifted by the Matsumae Domain to Sanada Yukitsura, eighth daimyō of Matsushiro Domain; at the Sanada Treasures Museum
- Poroya zu (ポロヤ図) — hanging scroll on silk from the first half of the nineteenth century, with Poroya and his dog transplanted into a mountainous coastal landscape, by Takahashi Namiai (高橋波藍); understood to have been gifted by the Matsumae Domain to Kyōgoku Takaakira, sixth daimyō of Marugame Domain; private collection
- Shokō Ezo Nikki (初航蝦夷日誌) or Diary of the First Voyage to Ezo — illustrations, ink on paper, of 1850, by Matsuura Takeshirō (ICP); featuring the portraits of Nishikomake, Poroya, and Shimochi; Matsuura Takeshirō Memorial Museum
- Ezo Manga (蝦夷漫画) — woodblock print edition containing a version of Shimochi, dating to 1859, by Matsuura Takeshirō
- Tsukinoe shōzō zu (ツキノエ肖像図) — hanging scroll on silk of 1870, depicting Tsukinoe, by Kojima Sessō; private collection, deposited at Akitakata City Museum of History and Folklore (安芸高田市歴史民俗博物館)

== Gallery ==
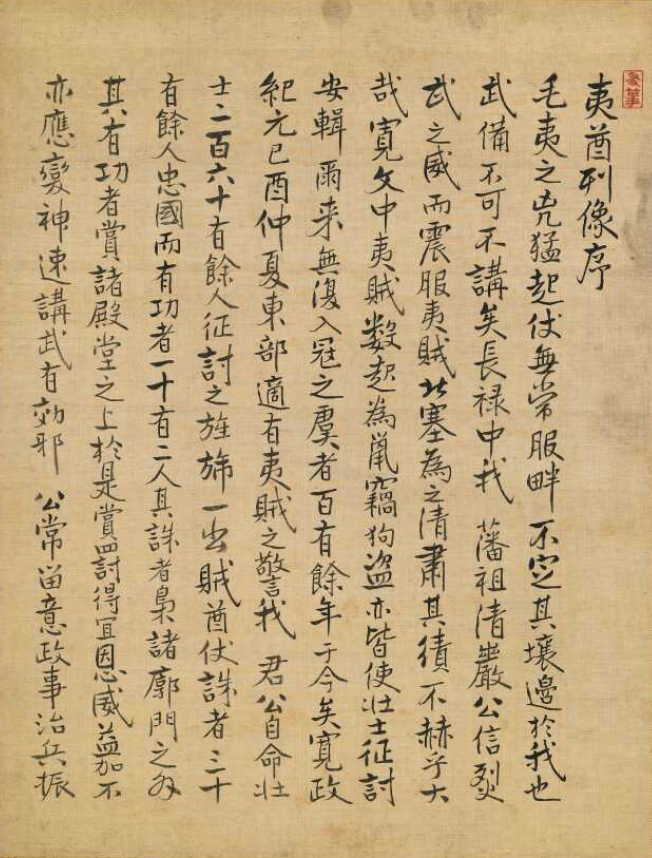
Preface I

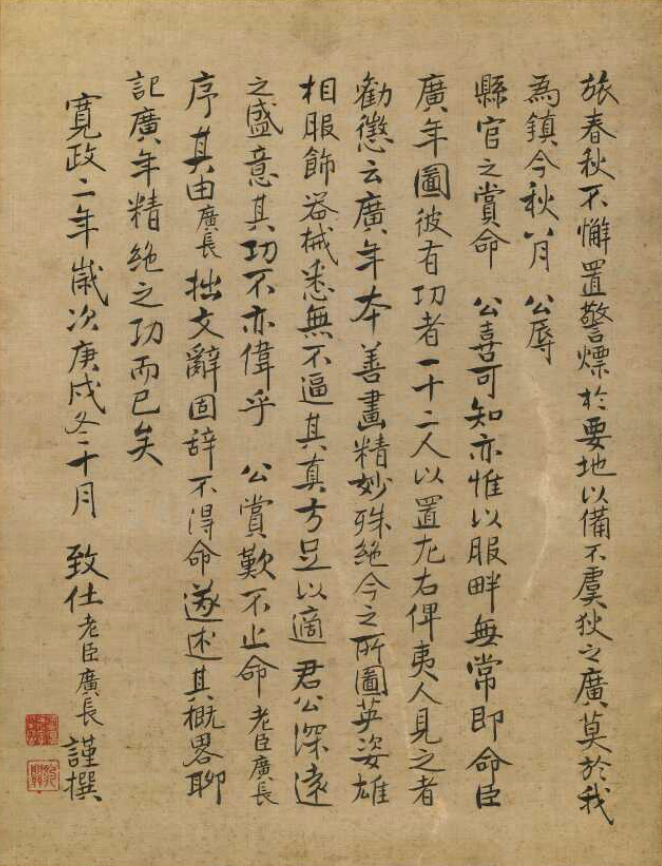
Preface II

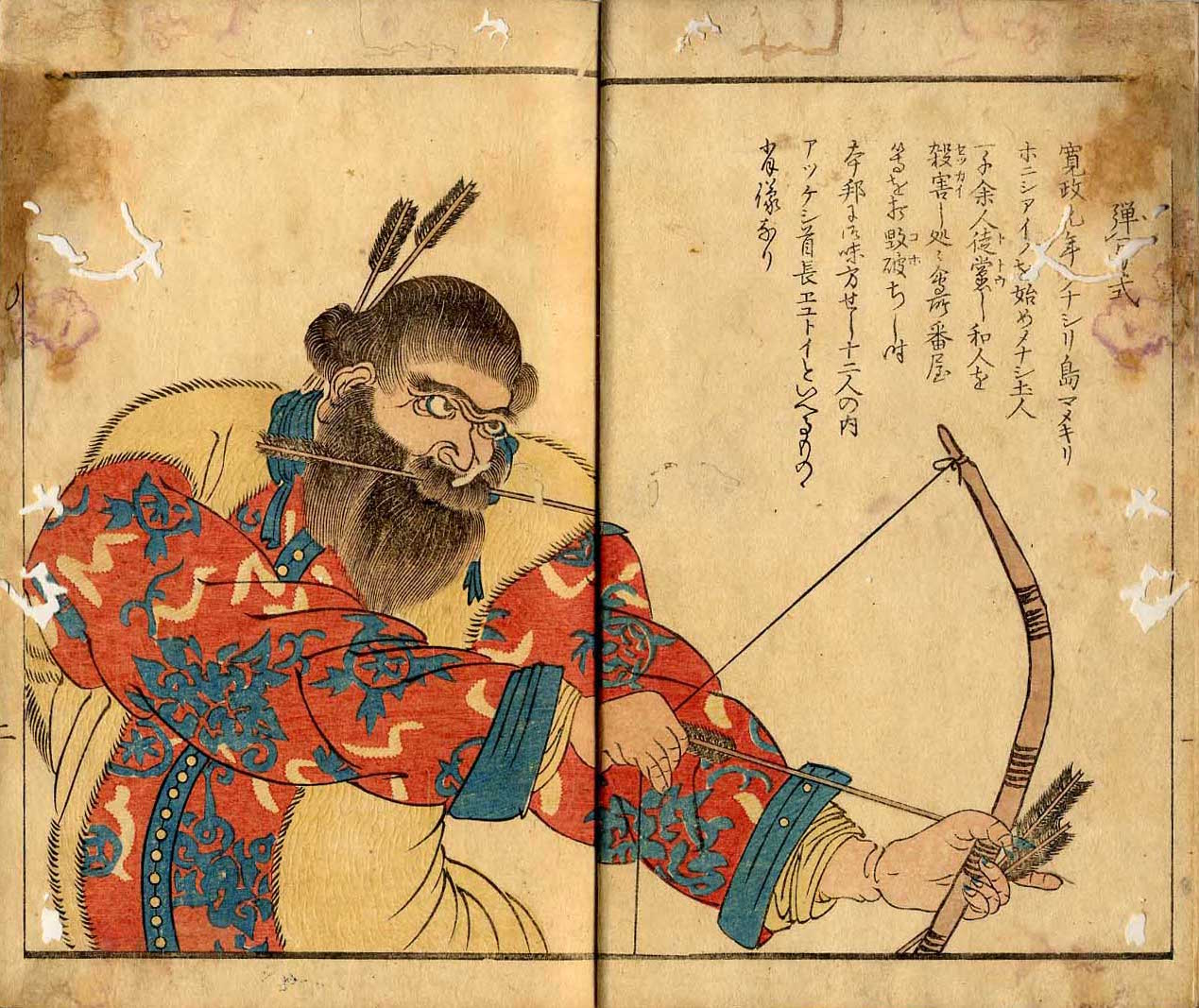
Woodblock printed version of Shimochi in Matsuura Takeshirō's Ezo Manga (1859)

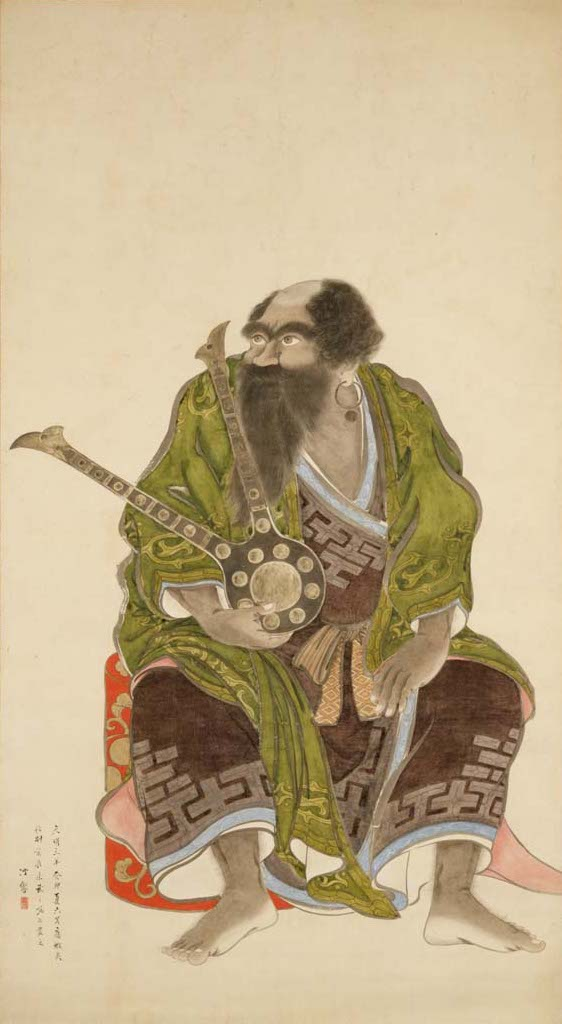
Tobu, Chieftain of Monbetsu, by Kakizaki Hakyō (1783) (Tokyo National Museum)

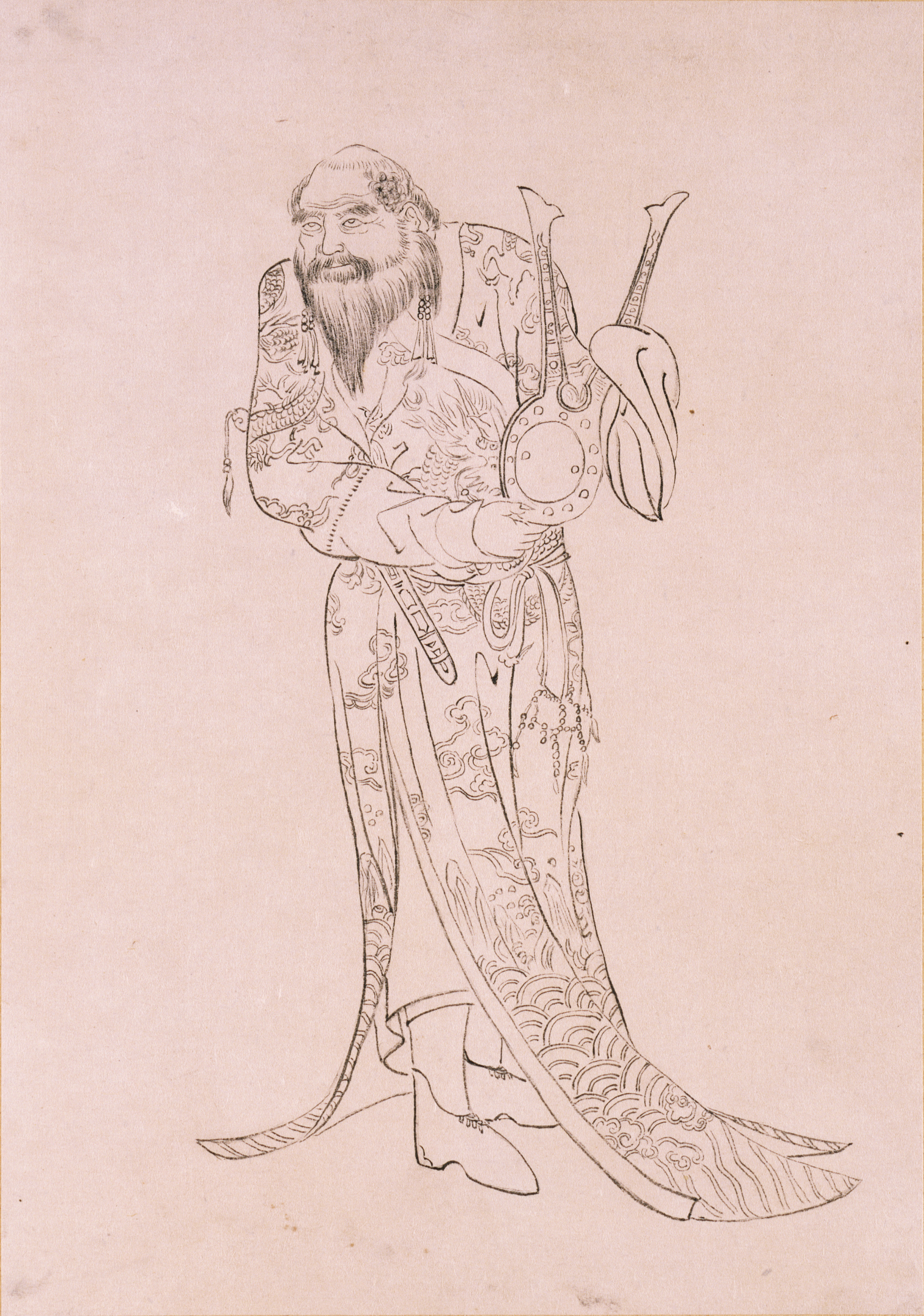
Sketch of Chousama, understood not to be in Kakzaki Hakyōs own hand

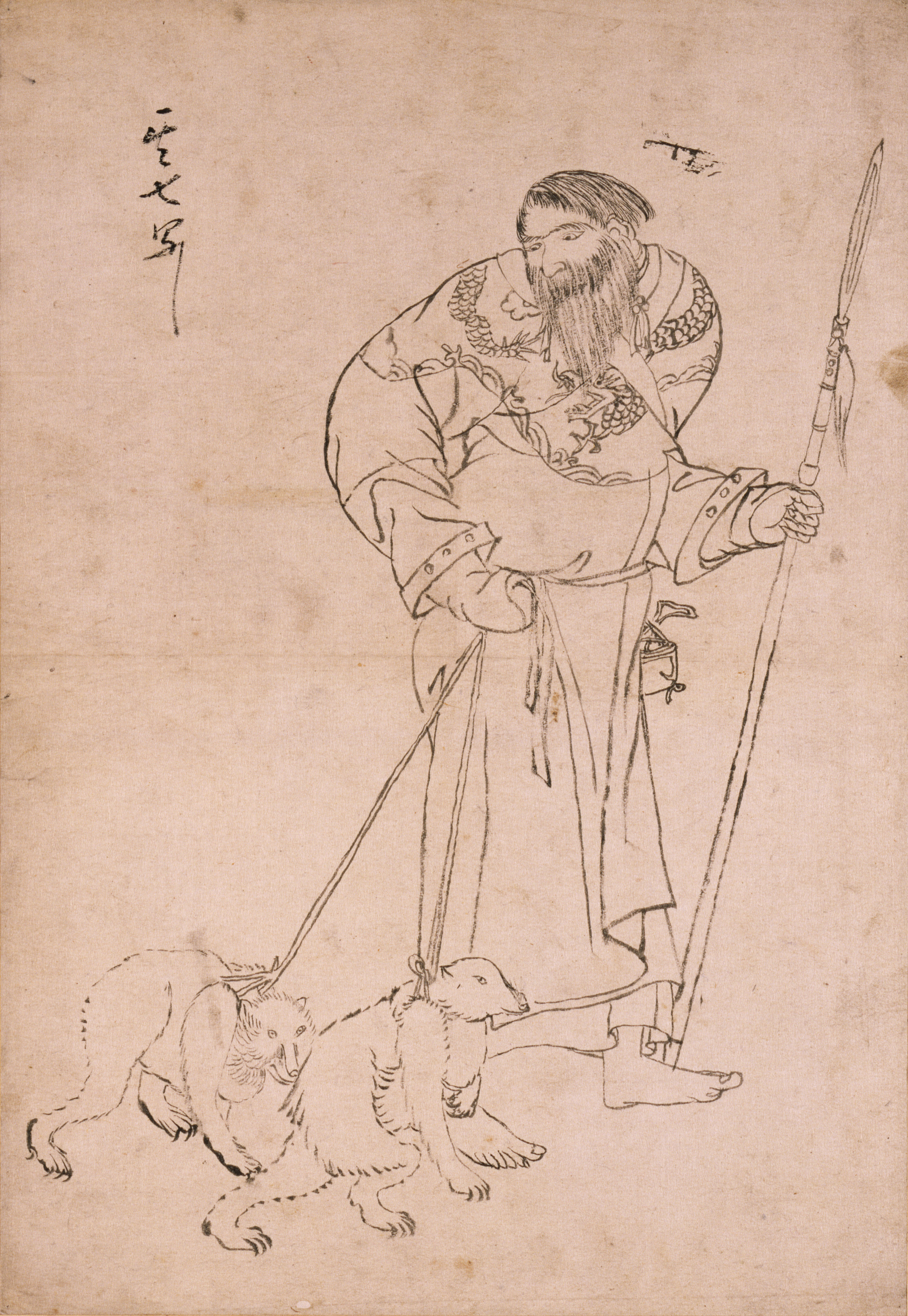
Sketch of Ininkari, understood not to be in Kakzaki Hakyōs own hand

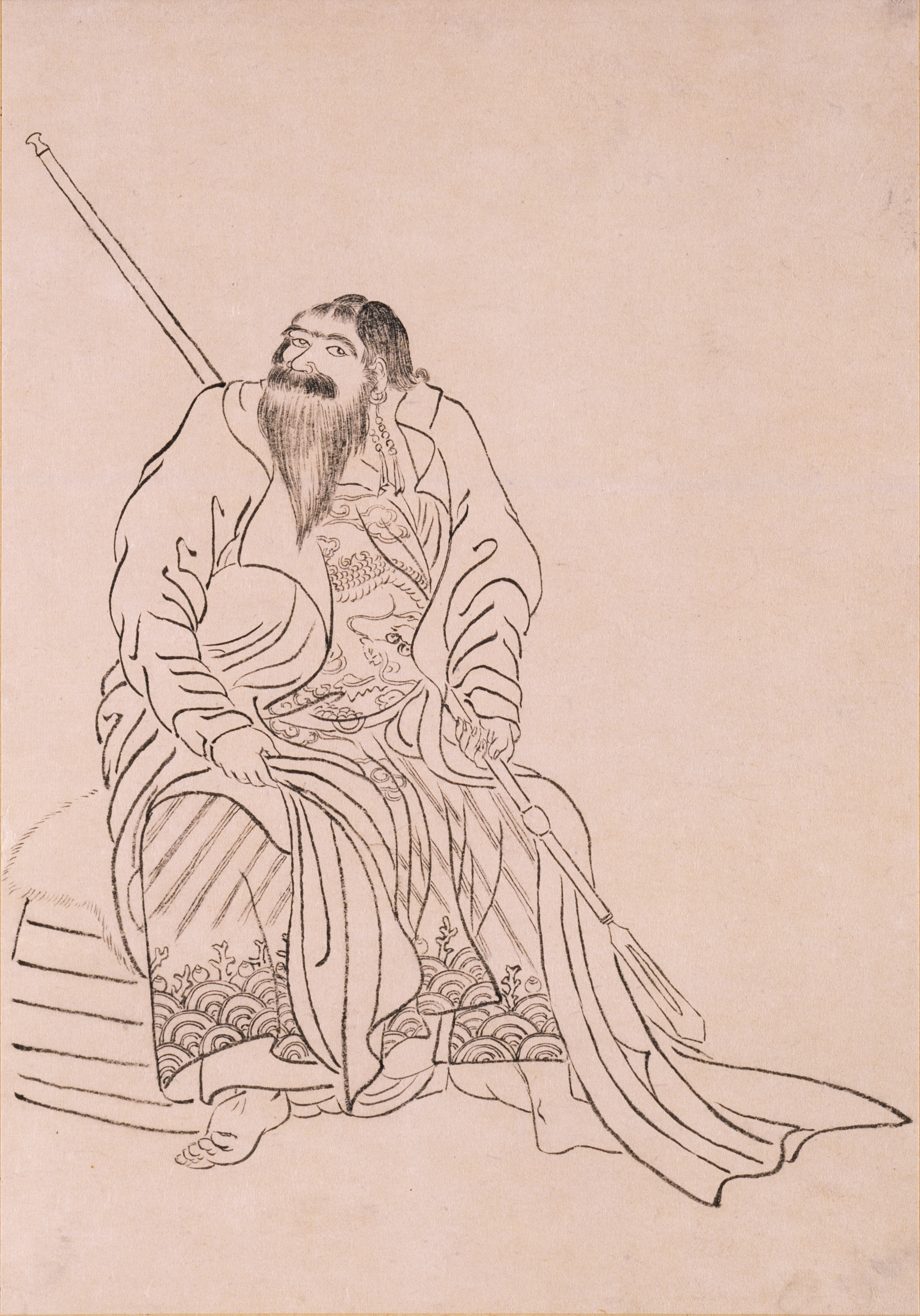
Sketch of Tsukinoe, understood not to be in Kakzaki Hakyōs own hand

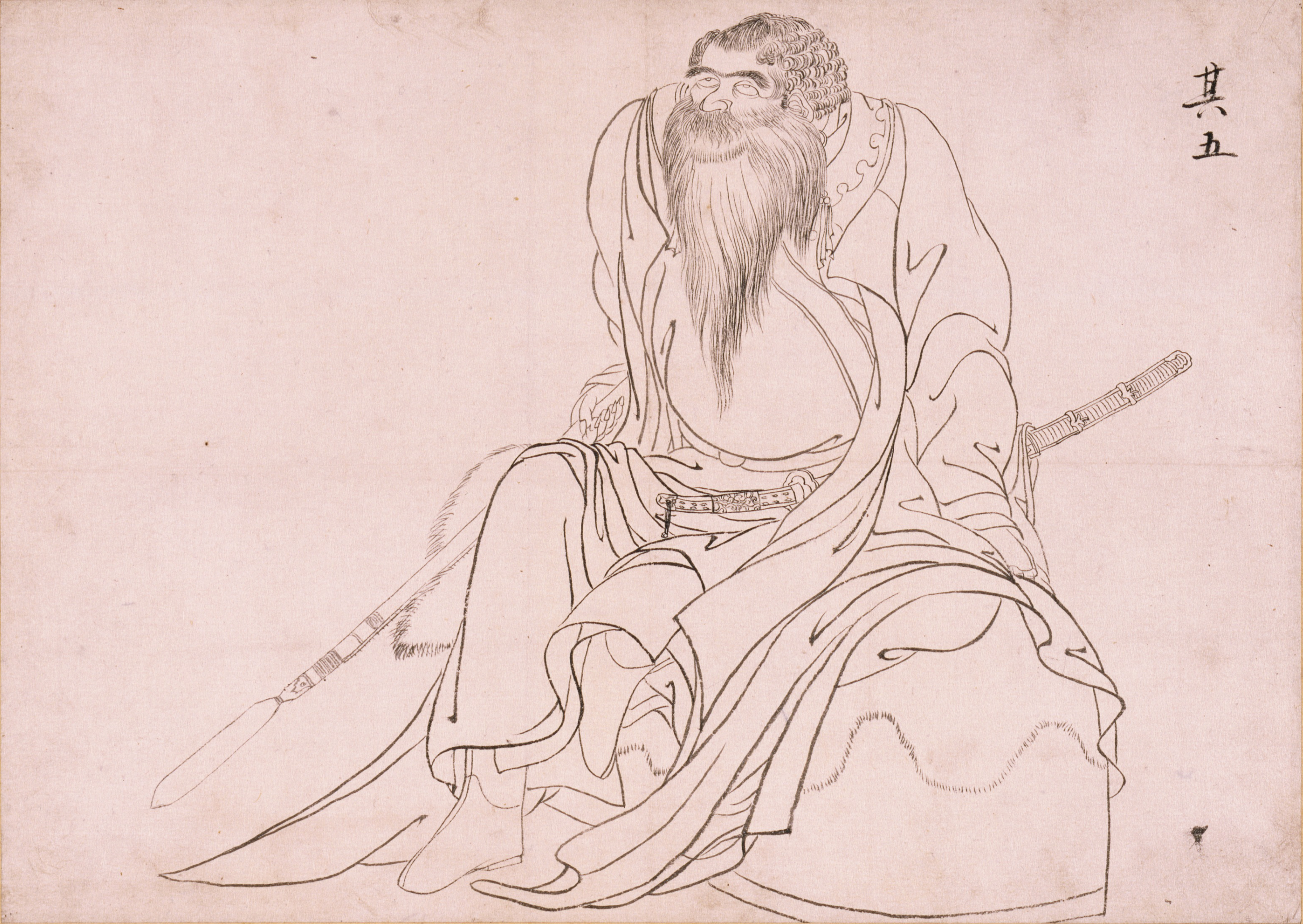
Sketch of Tsukinoe, understood not to be in Kakzaki Hakyōs own hand

== See also ==
- List of Cultural Properties of Japan - paintings (Hokkaidō)
- Orientalism (book)
- Shinra no Kiroku
