= Omusha =

Ainu ceremonial

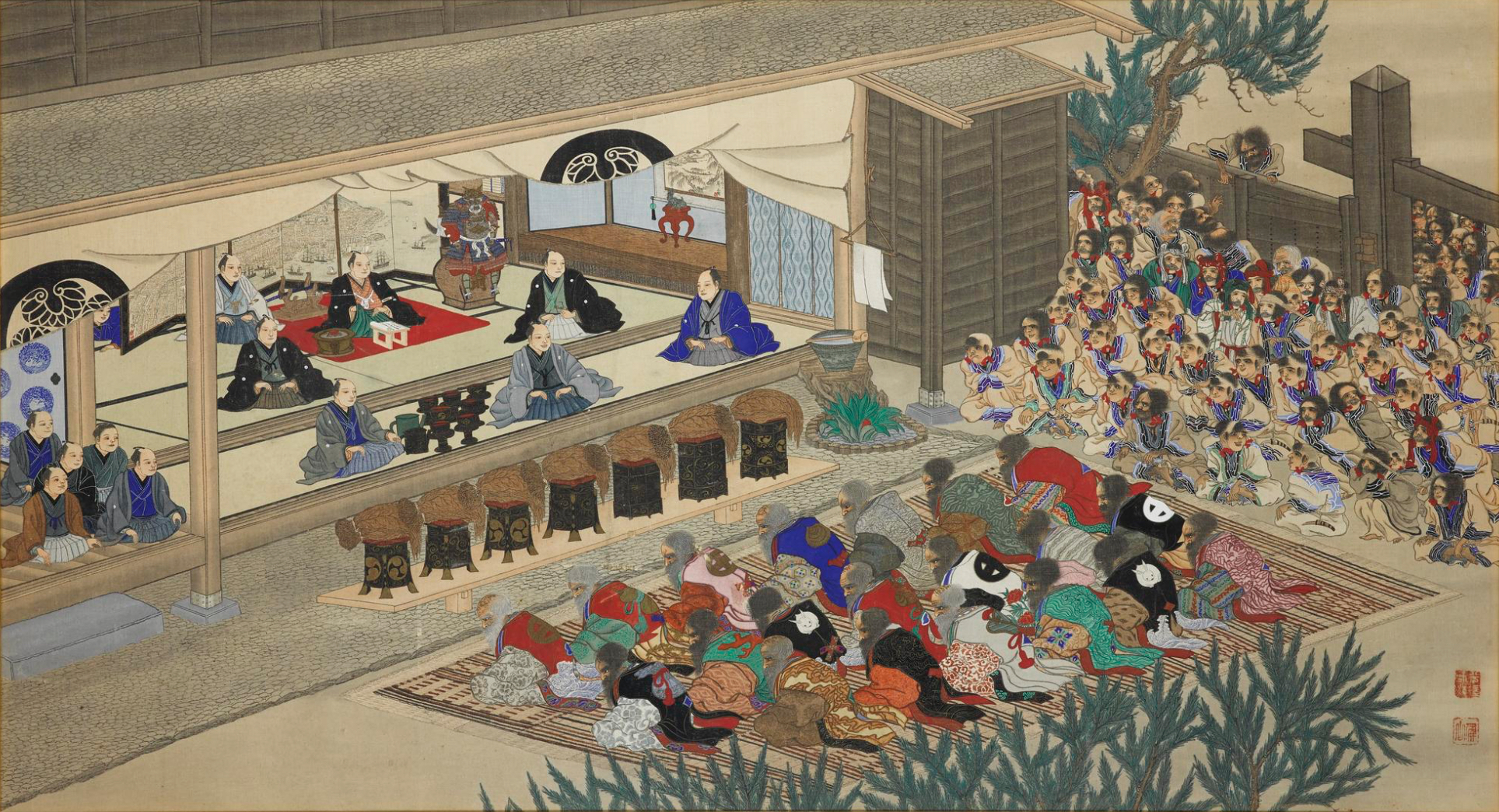
Omusha ceremony (1876) by Hirasawa Byōzan (ja) (National Museums Scotland)

Omusha (オムシャ), also umusa or umsa, was an Ainu greeting ritual that, like the related uimamu (ウイマム), became a ceremonial—of trade—full of the political symbolism of subservience, to the Matsumae Domain.

== Name ==
The word is understood to derive from the Ainu u (ウ), referring to mutuality, and musa (ムシャ), translated and defined by John Batchelor as "to stroke the head in salutation".

== Related images ==
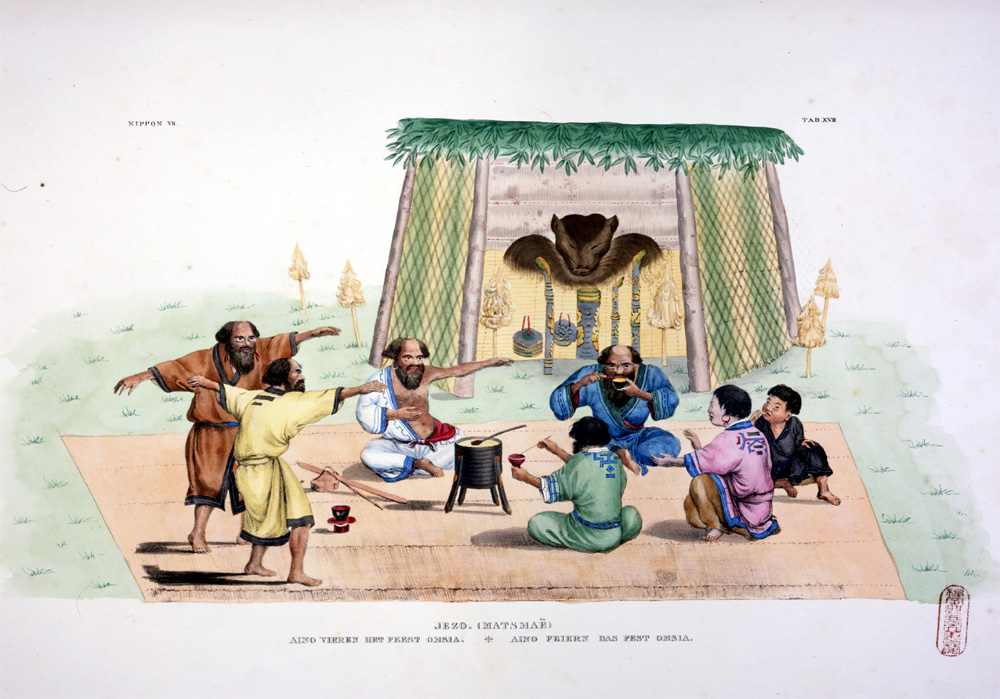
Ainu celebrating Omsia (from Siebold's Nippon (1832–1851))

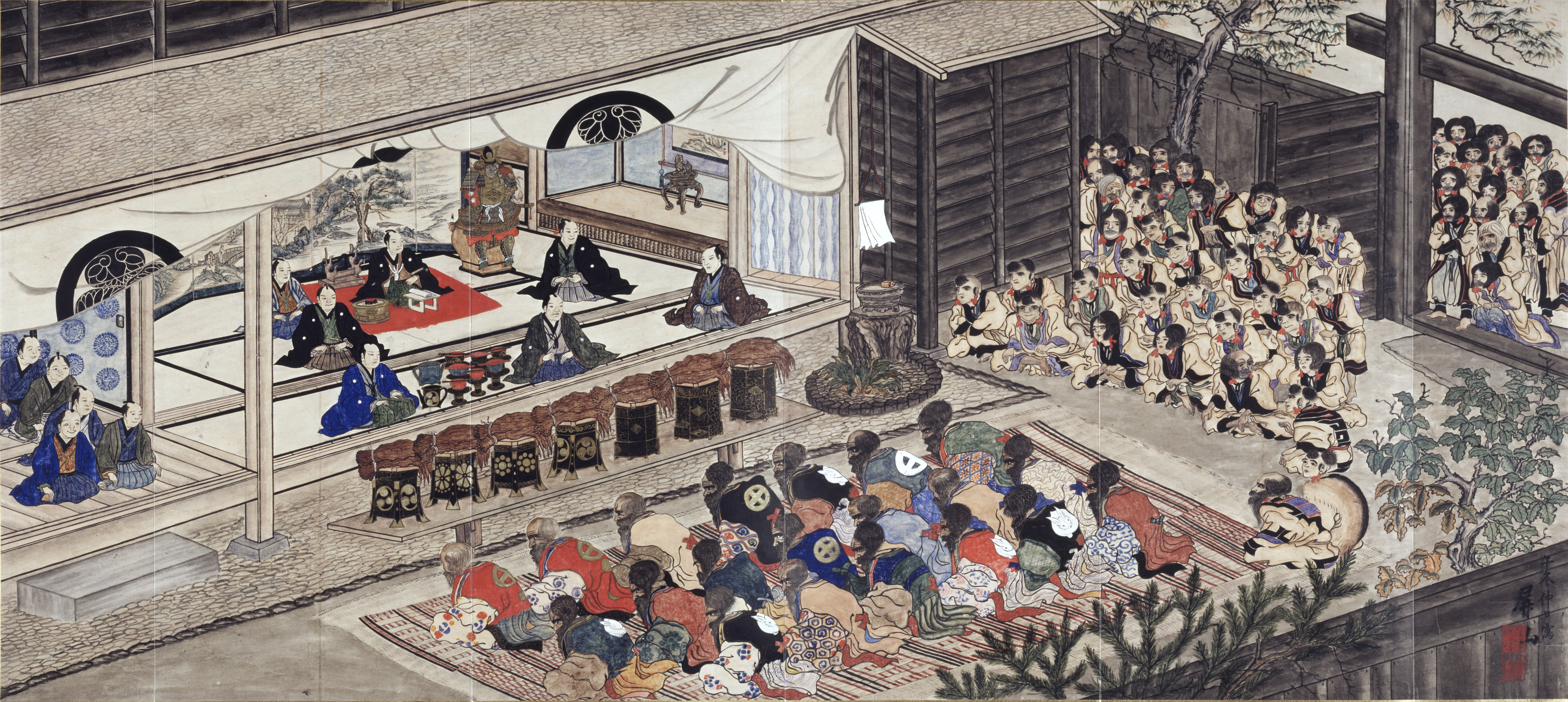
Omusha involving the Hidaka Ainu (C19), by Hirasawa Byōzan (Hakodate City Central Library)

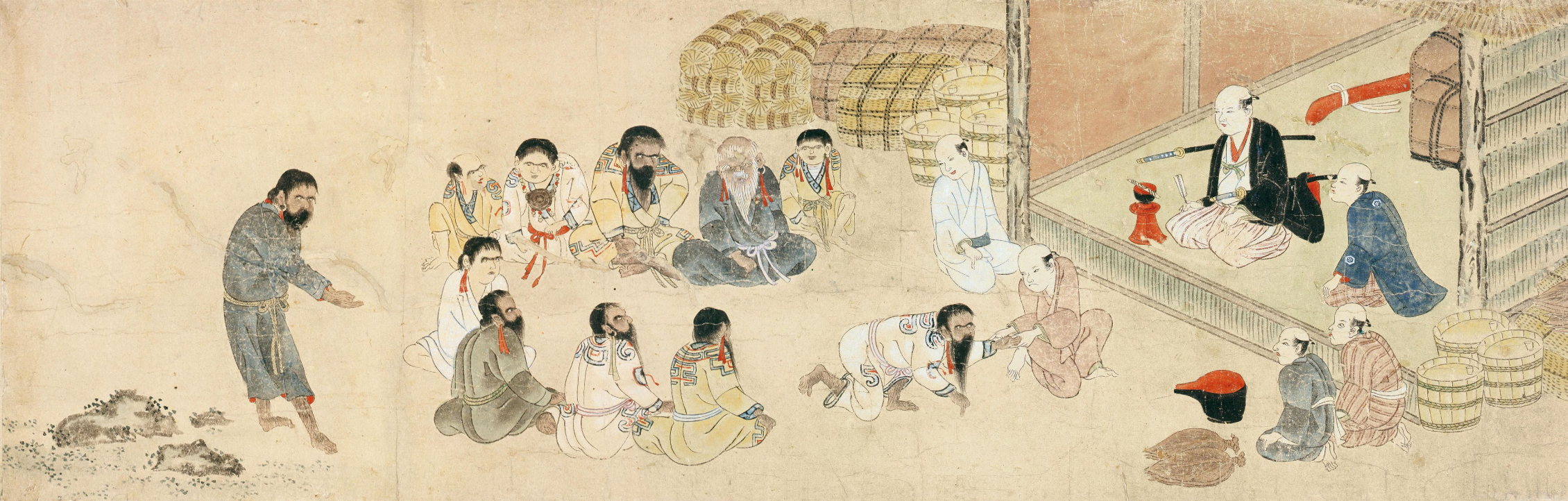
Scenes of the Ezo Fishing Grounds (C18), by Kodama Teiryō (小玉貞良) (Art Gallery of South Australia)

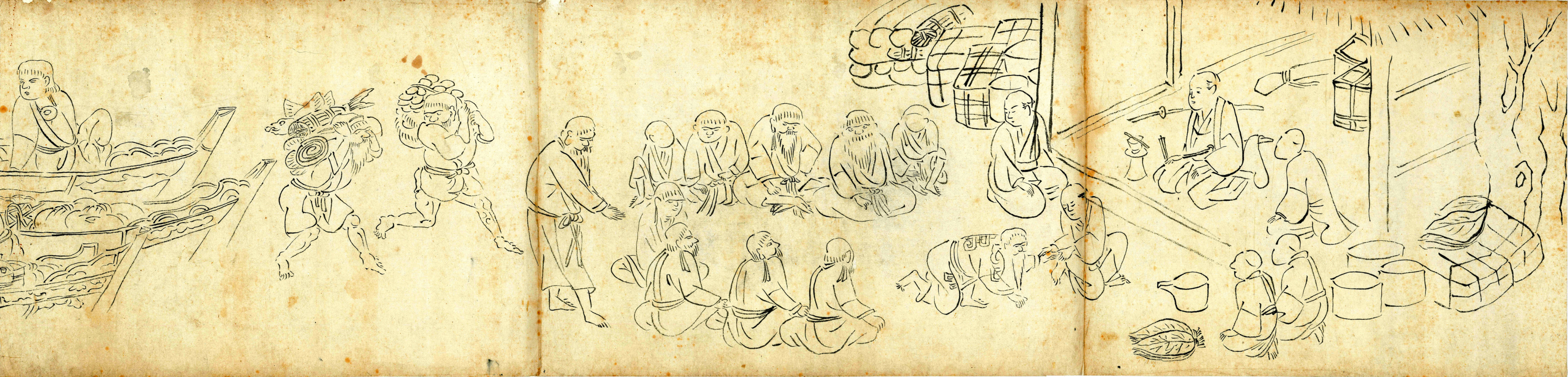
Sketch for Scenes of the Ezo Fishing Grounds (C18), by Kodama Teiryō (Hakodate City Museum)

== See also ==
- Invented tradition
