= Hakodate City Central Library =

Japanese library

- 函館市中央図書館
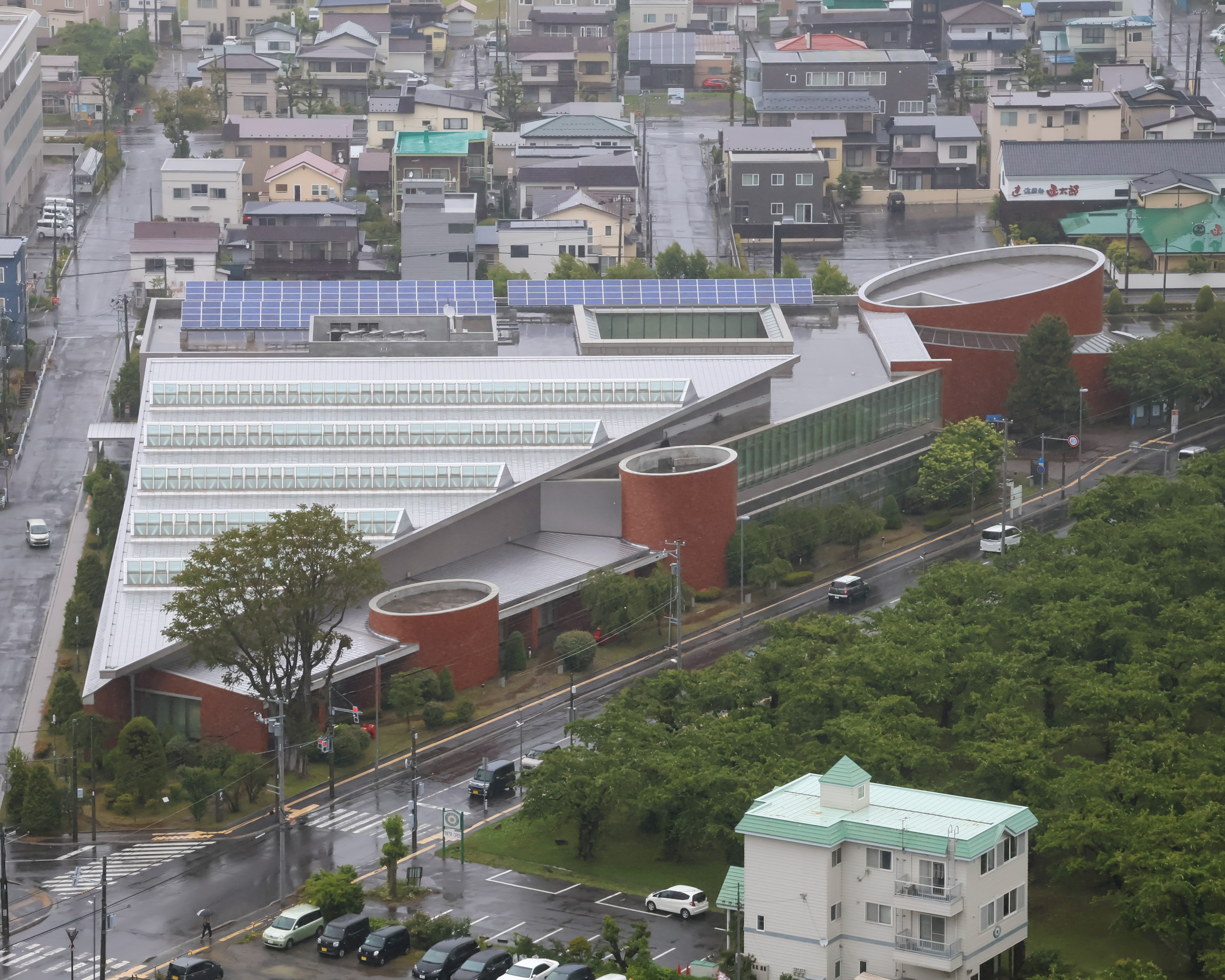
- 41°47′54″N 140°45′13″E
- Location: 26 Goryōkaku-chō, Hakodate, Hokkaidō, Japan
- Established: 17 July 1928 (Hakodate City Library); 27 November 2005 (Hakodate City Central Library)

Collection
- Items collected: 680,000 (as of 2010)

Other information
- Website: hakodate-lib.jp

Hakodate City Central Library (函館市中央図書館, Hakodate-shi Chūō Toshokan) is a public library in Hakodate, Hokkaidō, Japan. The library is known in particular for its important collection of northern materials and for its Takuboku Library (啄木文庫).

== History ==
The origins of a library in Hakodate lie in the opening of a society library at the home of Okada Kenzō (岡田健蔵) in 1907. Two years later, the private membership Hakodate Library opened in municipal premises in Hakodate Park (函館公園). In 1915, with a donation from Sōma Teppei (相馬哲平), construction of a dedicated five-storey library began, completed the following year; this building is important as an early example of a reinforced concrete building on the island (cf. Ōtani Hongan-ji Hakodate Betsu-in). In the first year of the Shōwa era (1926), city councillors approved the design of a new municipal library, three storey, again in reinforced concrete. With the approval of the private Hakodate Library's director Hirade Kisaburō (平出喜三郎), its entire collection was donated and transferred, and in 1928 the new Hakodate City Library (市立函館図書館) opened to the public. Duty to the city's growth, a number of local libraries were opened in the following decades. In 2005 the new Hakodate City Central Library opened across the road from Goryōkaku.

== Gallery ==
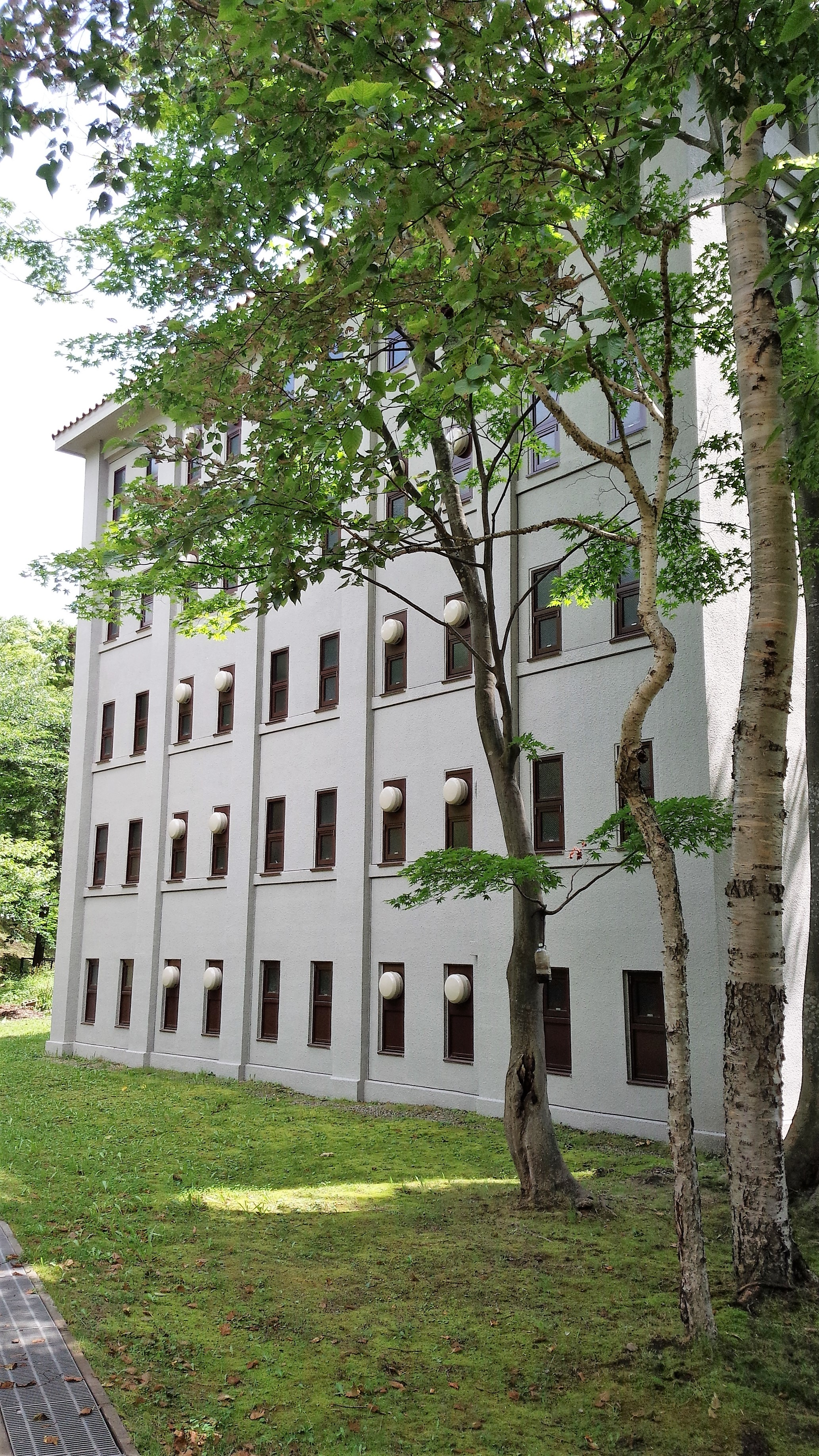
Former library building

From Customs of Ezo, by Kodama Teiryō (小玉貞良)

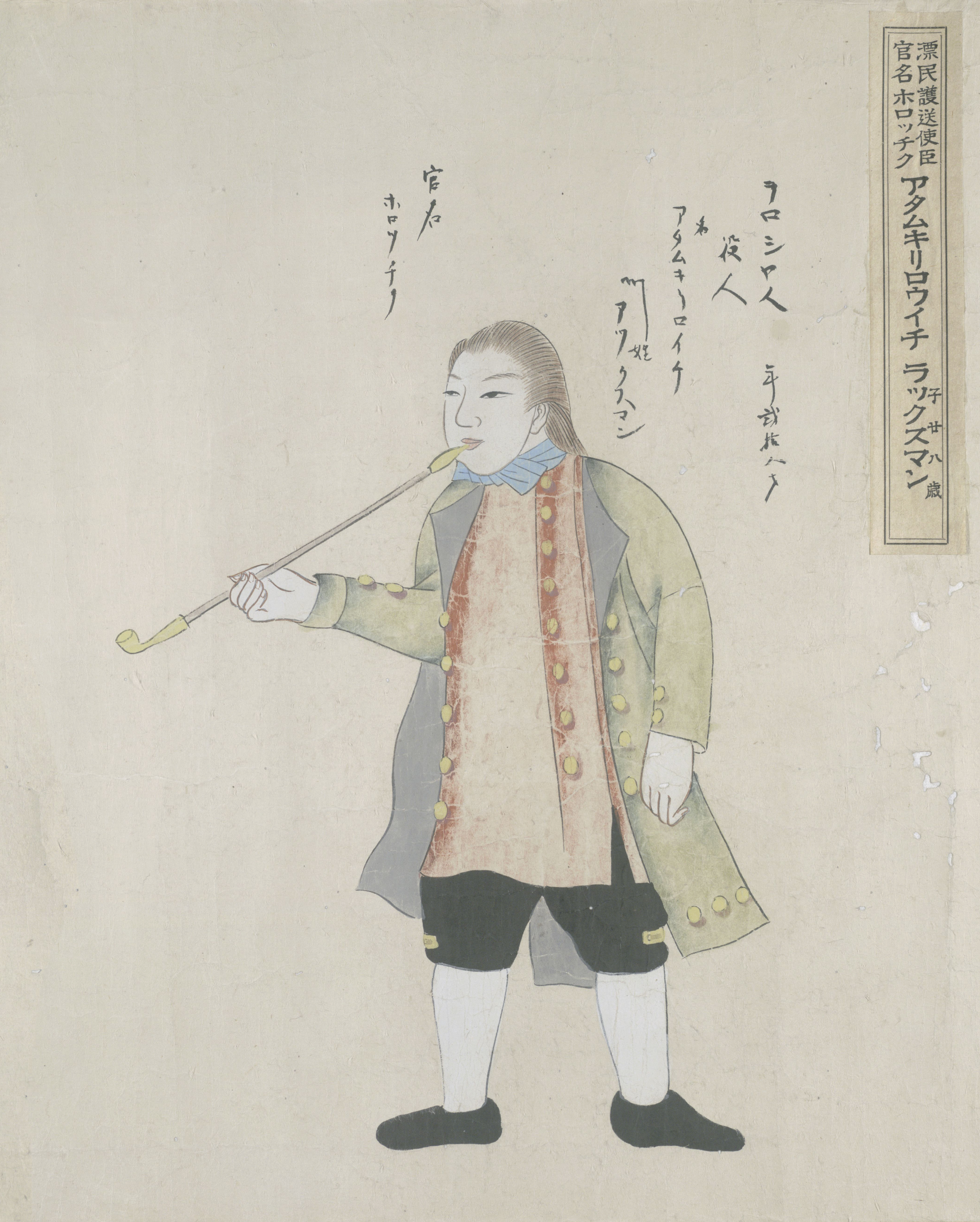
Adam Laxman, from a 1793 painted scroll of his expedition

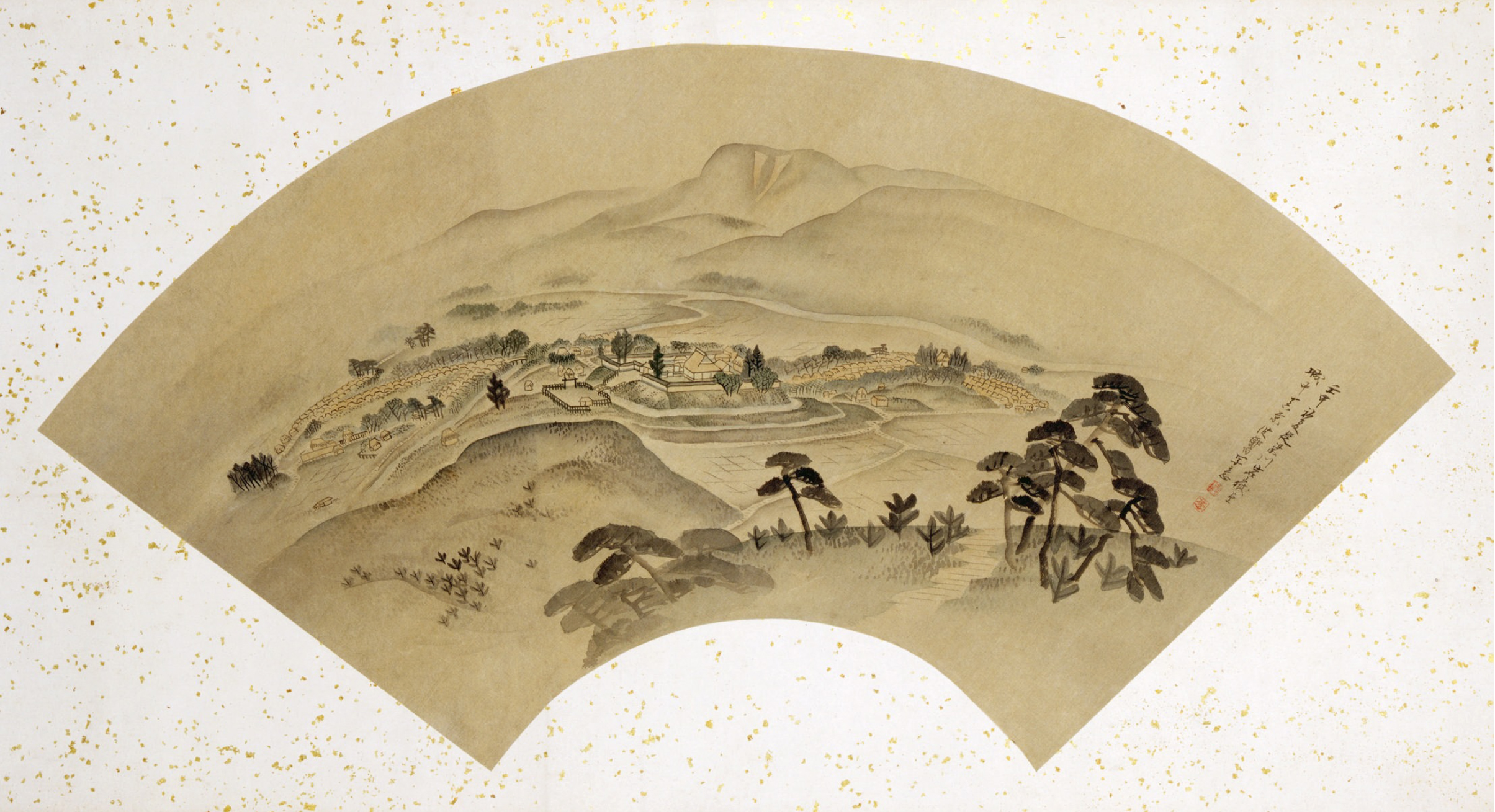
From Eight Views of Yanagawa (1812) by Kakizaki Hakyō

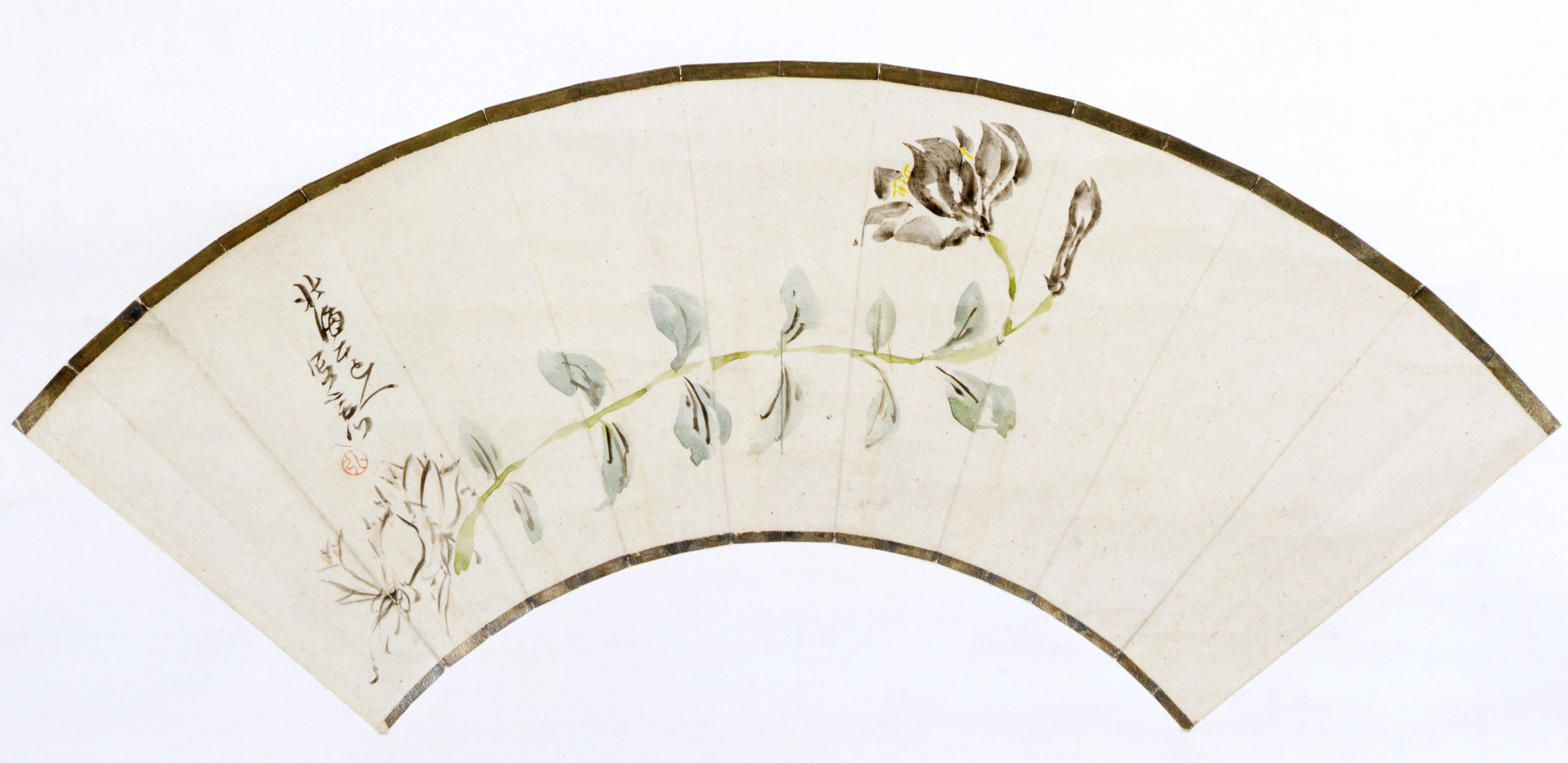
Kamchatka Lily by Matsuura Takeshirō

== See also ==
- List of libraries in Japan
- Hakodate City Museum
- Hakodate City Museum of Northern Peoples
- Hakodate City Museum of Literature
- Ishikawa Takuboku
