= List of cultural properties of Japan – paintings (Hokkaido) =

This list is of the cultural properties of Japan designated in the category of paintings (絵画, kaiga) for the circuit of Hokkaidō.

== National Cultural Properties ==
As of 1 July 2019, zero properties have been designated as being of national significance.

== Prefectural Cultural Properties ==
As of 1 July 2019, five properties have been designated at a prefectural level.

Property	Date	Municipality	Ownership	Comments	Image	Dimensions	Coordinates	Ref.
Sakyamunī's Parinirvāṇa, by Kakizaki Hakyō 釈迦涅槃図蠣崎波響筆; Shaka nehan-zu Kakizaki Hakyō-hitsu	1811	Hakodate	Kōryū-ji (高龍寺)	pair of scrolls; this two scroll format is unusual; most of the activity is in the left-hand scroll; on the bottom of the box is the date Bunka 11 (1814), on the back of the mounting that of Bunka 9 (1812), while a note of dedication refers to their being painted in Bunka 8 (1811) for the priest of Kōryū-ji (高龍寺) in Hakodate		2.99 metres (9 ft 10 in) by 1.405 metres (4 ft 7.3 in)	41°46′07″N 140°41′58″E	
Sketchbook for Ishū Retsuzō 夷酋列像粉本; Ishū Retsuzō funpon	1790	Hakodate	Hakodate City Central Library (函館市中央図書館)	thirteen studies by Kakizaki Hakyō for the series of paintings of twelve Ainu chiefs who had cooperated with the Matsumae Domain during the Menashi-Kunashir Rebellion; in order, Chikiriashikai, Shonko, Ikotoi, Chousama, Poroya, Ininkari, Nishikomake, Mautarake, Nochikusa, and Tsukinoe		45 centimetres (18 in) by 42.5 centimetres (16.7 in)	41°47′54″N 140°45′12″E	
Byōbu of Matsumae 松前屏風; Matsumae byōbu	1754-64	Matsumae	Matsumae Town Historical Museum	6 panels, by Kodama Teiryō (小玉貞良)		3.648 metres (11 ft 11.6 in) by 1.57 metres (5 ft 2 in)	41°26′08″N 140°06′43″E	
Ema with the Kamui nomi 絵馬カムイノミの図 ema kamui-nomi no zu	1899	Toyokoro	Ōtsuinaka Jinja (大津稲荷神社)	Kamui nomi is a ritual prayer to the kami for bounty; the ema, by Kawanabe Kyōsai, shows the Tokachi fishing grounds were harvested by the Ainu			42°41′12″N 143°38′53″E	
Votive ema from Itsukushima Jinja 厳島神社奉納絵馬; Itsukushima Jinja hōnō ema	C19 (first half)	Mashike	Itsukushima Jinja (厳島神社)	seven ema, including a rare example on glass			43°51′22″N 141°31′28″E	

== Municipal Cultural Properties ==
Properties designated at a municipal level include:

Property	Date	Municipality	Ownership	Comments	Image	Dimensions	Coordinates	Ref.
Ceiling paintings in the Daibutsu-ji Hondō 大佛寺本堂の天井画; Daibutsuji hondō no tenjō-ga		Kutchan	Daibutsu-ji (大仏寺)				42°54′01″N 140°44′13″E	for all refs see
Ceiling painting of a Dragon at Tennō-ji 鬼鹿天応寺龍図天井画; Onishika Tennō-ji ryū-zu tenjō-ga	1903	Obira	Tennō-ji (天応寺)	by Kubota Kinsen (久保田金僊)				
Bird's-eye View of the Prosperous Yunai Fishing Grounds 湯内漁場盛業鳥瞰図; Yunai ryōba seigyō chōkanzu	Meiji period	Yoichi	Yoichi Fisheries Museum (よいち水産博物館)				43°11′48″N 140°47′13″E	
Bird's-eye View of Yoichi During the Ansei Era 安政年間のヨイチ鳥瞰図; Ansei-nenkan no Yoichi chōkanzu	c.1857	Yoichi	private (kept at Yoichi Fisheries Museum (よいち水産博物館))				43°11′48″N 140°47′13″E	
Map of the Eastern Regions by Hayashi Shihei 林子平東邦地図; Hayashi Shihei tōhō chizu	C18	Yoichi	Yoichi Town (kept at Yoichi Fisheries Museum (よいち水産博物館))				43°11′48″N 140°47′12″E	
Ainu Painting (Warrior's Banner Sketching) アイヌ絵(武者のぼり下絵); Ainu-e (musha-nobori shita-e)	Bunsei era	Yoichi	Old Shimoyoichi Unjōya (旧下ヨイチ運上家)	by Hayasaka Bunrei (早坂文嶺); parallels have been drawn by scholars between the image of the warrior and that of Minamoto no Tametomo; the Ainu elder plays a tonkori		3 metres (9 ft 10 in)	43°11′52″N 140°47′16″E	
Bodhidharma, by the Priest Tōkai 東開和尚筆達磨絵; Tōkai-oshō hitsu Daruma-e	Meiji period	Yoichi	Eizen-ji (永全寺)				43°12′04″N 140°46′01″E	
Nichizō Bosatsu, inscribed hanging scroll 日像菩薩本尊銘の掛軸; Hikata bosatsu honzon mei no kakejiku	1334	Yoichi	Hokke-ji (法華寺)				43°11′52″N 140°46′07″E	
Ainu-emaki アイヌ絵巻; Ainu-emaki	Edo period	Kaminokuni	Kaminokuni Town					
Sketches of the Plants and Trees of Ezo, by Kobayashi Gennosuke 小林源之助著 蝦夷地草木写生図; Kobayashi Gennosuke-cho Ezo-chi kusaki shasei zu	1792	Hakodate	Hakodate City Central Library (函館市中央図書館)	two volumes		28.5 centimetres (11.2 in) by 18.5 centimetres (7.3 in)	41°47′54″N 140°45′12″E	
Customs of Ezo, by Kodama Teiryō 小玉貞良筆 蝦夷国風図絵; Kodama Teiryō hitsu Ezo-koku fūzu-e	C18	Hakodate	Hakodate City Central Library (函館市中央図書館)	one scroll; depicts Ainu customs such as fishing and harvesting seaweed		28 centimetres (11 in) by 9.78 metres (32 ft 1 in)	41°47′54″N 140°45′12″E	
Ainu Customs of the Twelve Months, byōbu アイヌ風俗12カ月屏風; Ainu fūzoku 12-kagetsu byōbu	C19	Hakodate	Hakodate City Museum	pair of six-fold screens; by Hirosawa Byōzan (平沢屏山); the first six panels are a later copy by Miyahara Ryūsen (宮原柳僊)		139 centimetres (4 ft 7 in) by 51.5 centimetres (20.3 in) to 52.5 centimetres (20.7 in)	41°45′22″N 140°42′52″E	
Eight Views of Yanagawa 梁川八景; Yanagawa hakkei	1812	Hakodate	Hakodate City Central Library (函館市中央図書館)	series of eight paintings by Kakizaki Hakyō; in 1807 the Matsumae clan were transferred to Yanagawa in Mutsu Province		21.6 centimetres (8.5 in) by 53.5 centimetres (21.1 in)	41°47′54″N 140°45′12″E	
Chinese Beauty 唐美人; Kara-bijin	c.1815	Hakodate	Hakodate City Museum	by Kakizaki Hakyō		108 centimetres (43 in) by 44 centimetres (17 in)	41°45′22″N 140°42′52″E	
Koropokkuru Beneath a Butterbur 蕗下コロポックル人の図; Fuki-ka koropokkuru hito no zu	C19	Hakodate	Hakodate City Museum	by Matsuura Takeshirō (松浦武四郎)		23.0 centimetres (9.1 in) by 31.0 centimetres (12.2 in)	41°45′22″N 140°42′52″E	
Vimalakīrti 維摩; Yuima		Hakodate	Hakodate City Museum	by Shimomura Kanzan		157 centimetres (62 in) by 72 centimetres (28 in)	41°45′22″N 140°42′52″E	
Ainu-emaki アイヌ絵巻; Ainu-emaki	1874	Hakodate	Hakodate City Museum	single scroll by Tomioka Tessai		231 centimetres (91 in) by 25.5 centimetres (10.0 in)	41°45′22″N 140°42′52″E	
Mount Penglai 蓬莱図; Hōrai-zu	early C18	Hakodate	Hakodate City Museum	three scrolls by Kanō Tsunenobu		159 centimetres (63 in) by 96 centimetres (38 in)	41°45′22″N 140°42′52″E	
Cherry Blossoms and Pheasant in the Spring Rain, colour on silk, by Kakizaki Hakyō 絹本着色春雨桜雉図 蠣崎波響筆 kenpon chakushoku harusame sakura kiji zu Kakizaki Hakyō-hitsu		Hakodate	Hakodate City Museum			109 centimetres (43 in) by 44 centimetres (17 in)	41°45′22″N 140°42′52″E	
Mandarin Ducks on a Rock, colour on silk, by Kakizaki Hakyō 絹本着色厳上鴛鴦図 蠣崎波響筆 kenpon chakushoku gen-jō oshidori zu Kakizaki Hakyō-hitsu	1789	Hakodate	Hakodate City Museum			96 centimetres (38 in) by 36.5 centimetres (14.4 in)	41°45′22″N 140°42′52″E	
Gosekku, colour on silk, by Kakizaki Hakyō 絹本着色五節句図 蠣崎波響筆 kenpon chakushoku gen-jō oshidori zu Kakizaki Hakyō-hitsu		Hakodate	Hakodate City Museum	with hagoita for the first month, peach blossoms for the third, irises for the fifth, the two Tanabata lovers for the seventh, and chrysanthemum motifs for the ninth		96.5 centimetres (38.0 in) by 35 centimetres (14 in)	41°45′22″N 140°42′52″E	
Peonies with a Sleeping Cat, colour on silk, by Kakizaki Hakyō 絹本着色牡丹睡猫図 蠣崎波響筆 kenpon chakushoku botan suibyō zu Kakizaki Hakyō-hitsu		Hakodate	Hakodate City Museum			97.5 centimetres (38.4 in) by 35 centimetres (14 in)	41°45′22″N 140°42′52″E	
Amaranthus tricolor, light colour on paper, by Kakizaki Hakyō 紙本単彩雁来紅図 蠣崎波響筆 shihon tansai ganraikō zu Kakizaki Hakyō-hitsu		Hakodate	Hakodate City Museum			98 centimetres (39 in) by 28 centimetres (11 in)	41°45′22″N 140°42′52″E	
Kamchatka Lily, by Matsuura Takeshirō 黒百合 松浦武四郎筆 kuro-yuri Matsuura Takeshirō-hitsu	C19	Hakodate	Hakodate City Central Library (函館市中央図書館)			44.4 centimetres (17.5 in) by 51.2 centimetres (20.2 in)	41°47′54″N 140°45′12″E	
Ezo People Worshipping Akanzan, by Matsuura Takeshirō 蝦夷人亜寒山遙拝の図 松浦武四郎筆; Ezo-hito Akanzan yōhai no zu Matsuura Takeshirō-hitsu	1882	Hakodate	private			145 centimetres (57 in) by 41.2 centimetres (16.2 in)		
Benten-jima Hachiyō-bashi 弁天島八千代橋の図; Benten-jima Hachiyō-bashi no zu	1915	Hakodate	Usujiri Elementary School (函館市立臼尻小学校)				41°55′49″N 140°56′27″E	
Votive ema with a Dragon from the Kakkumi Onsen Yakuō-den 川汲温泉薬王殿奉納絵馬「竜の図」 Kakkumi onsen Yakuō-den hōnō ema (ryū no zu)	1851	Hakodate	Hakodate City Museum				41°45′22″N 140°42′52″E	
Votive ema with a Horse from the Kakkumi Onsen Yakuō-den 川汲温泉薬王殿奉納絵馬「馬の図」 Kakkumi onsen Yakuō-den hōnō ema (uma no zu)		Hakodate	Hakodate City Museum				41°45′22″N 140°42′52″E	
Votive ema with The Parting of Kusunoki Masashige and His Son Masatsura at Sakurai from Kakkumi Inari Jinja 川汲稲荷神社奉納絵馬 「楠木正成正行父子桜井驛の別れの図」 Kakkumi Inari Jinja hōnō ema (Kusunoki Masashige Masatsura fushi Sakurai-eki no wakare no zu)	1862	Hakodate	Minamikayabe General Centre (南茅部総合センター)				41°54′21″N 140°58′17″E	

== See also ==
- Cultural Properties of Japan
- List of National Treasures of Japan (paintings)
- Japanese painting
- Ainu genre painting
