= Bark cloth =

Bark cloth may refer to:

- Barkcloth, made from tree bark in Asia, Africa, and the Pacific; also a variety of cotton cloth
- Cedar bark textile, used by indigenous people in the Pacific Northwest
- Tapa cloth, a cloth made from the bark of the paper mulberry tree
- Amate, a Mesoamerican bark paper, typically made with the bark of fig (ficus) trees
- Ainu bark cloth
- Other textiles made from tree bark, such as the bark cloth of the Baganda people of Uganda and lacebark, a textile made from the inner bark of the Lagetta lagetto tree
