= Jōgen =

Jōgen may refer to:

- Jōgen (Heian period) (貞元), Japanese era from 976 to 978
- Jōgen (Kamakura period) (承元), Japanese era from 1207 to 1211
- Jōgen (Shin Buddhist) (浄玄), founder of the Ōtani Hongan-ji Hakodate Betsu-in temple
