= Matsumae Town Historical Museum =

- 松前町郷土資料館
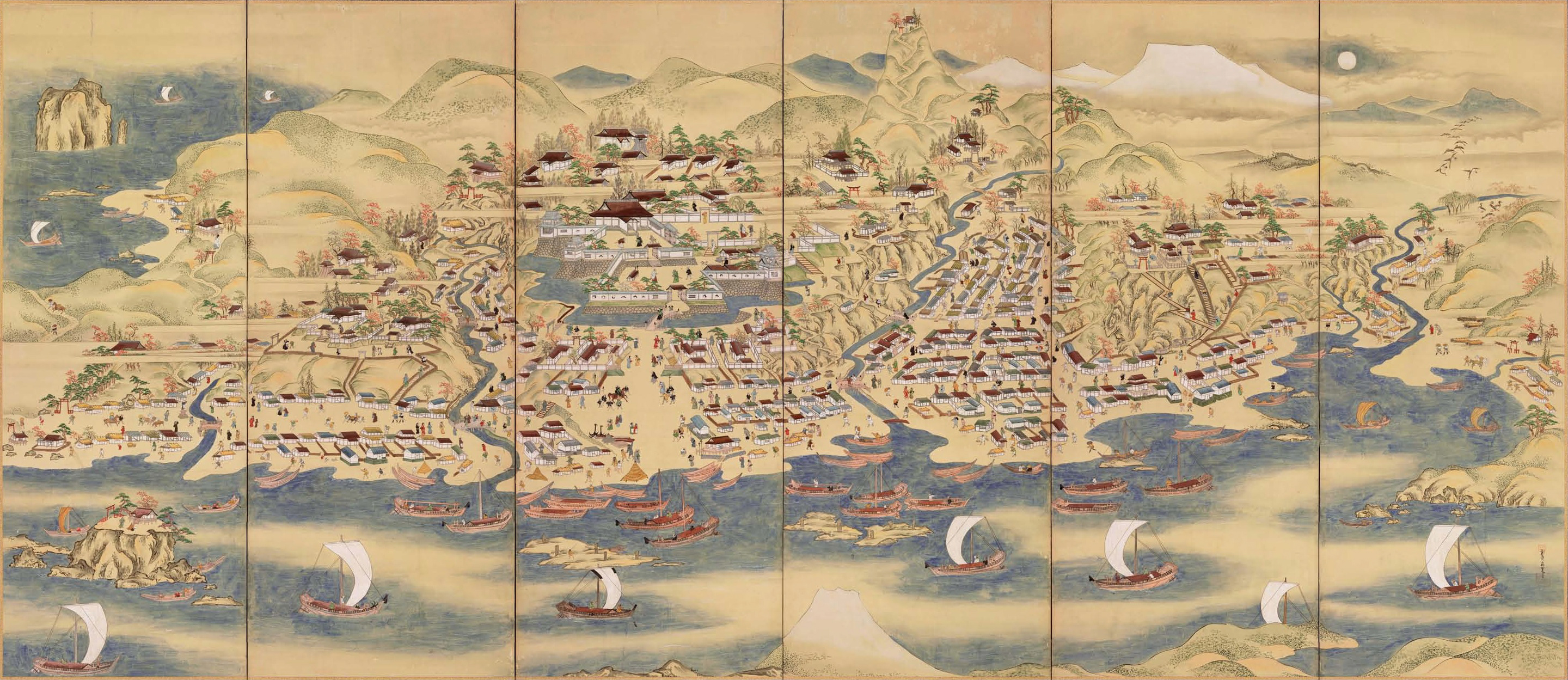
- Matsumae Byōbu by Kodama Teiryō (小玉貞良)
- Interactive map of the Matsumae Town Historical Museum area

General information
- Location: 30 Shinmei, Matsumae, Hokkaidō, Japan
- Coordinates: 41°26′09″N 140°06′44″E
- Opened: 1975

Matsumae Town Historical Museum (松前町郷土資料館, Matsumae-chō Kyōdo Shiryōkan) opened in Matsumae, Hokkaidō, Japan in 1975. The display documents the area's geology and natural history alongside displays related to the histories of the Ainu and of the Matsumae Domain.

== See also ==
- List of Cultural Properties of Japan - paintings (Hokkaidō)
- List of Cultural Properties of Japan - historical materials (Hokkaidō)
- Matsumae Castle
