= Yasuo Maekawa =

Japanese writer (1921–2003)

Yasuo Maekawa (前川 康男, Maekawa Yasuo; 1921–2003) was a Japanese children's book author. He was born in Tokyo Prefecture, and attended Waseda University.

== Bibliography ==
- Yan
- Majin no umi, about the Menashi-Kunashir Battle, winner of the Japanese Association of Writers for Children Prize in 1970
- Okaasan no umareta ie
- Kiseki kurabu
- Fushigi na furoshiki tsuzumi

== See also ==
- Japanese literature
- List of Japanese authors
