= Ainu genre painting =

Depictions of Ainu by Yamato (Wajin)

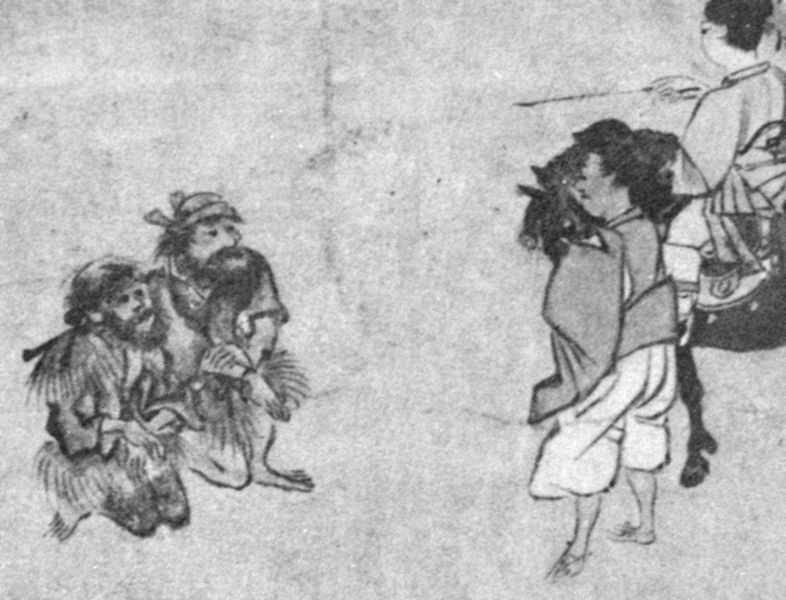
Emishi paying homage to Shōtoku Taishi (1321–4), a precursor to Ainu genre painting; detail from the Pictorial Biography of Prince Shōtoku (ICP), Jōgū-ji (上宮寺), kept at Ibaraki Prefectural Museum of History

Ainu genre painting (アイヌ風俗画, Ainu-fuzokuga) or (アイヌ絵 Ainu-e) is the Japanese art historical term for depictions of Ainu by Wajin, prevalent from the mid-Edo period to the early Meiji period (eighteenth and nineteenth centuries). The preliterate Ainu had no painting tradition of their own.

Typical subjects include myths and legends, rituals, encounters with wajin, hunting, fishing, and forms of entertainment. Artists active in the genre include Chishima Shunri (千島春里), Hayasaka Bunrei (早坂文嶺), Hirasawa Byōzan (平沢屏山), Kakizaki Hakyō, Kodama Teiryō (小玉貞良), Matsuura Takeshirō (松浦武四郎) Murakami Shimanojō (村上島之允), Murakami Teisuke (村上貞助), and Tani Gentan (谷元旦).

== See also ==
- Ishūretsuzō
- Namban art
- Orientalism
