= Tamasay =

Ainu necklace

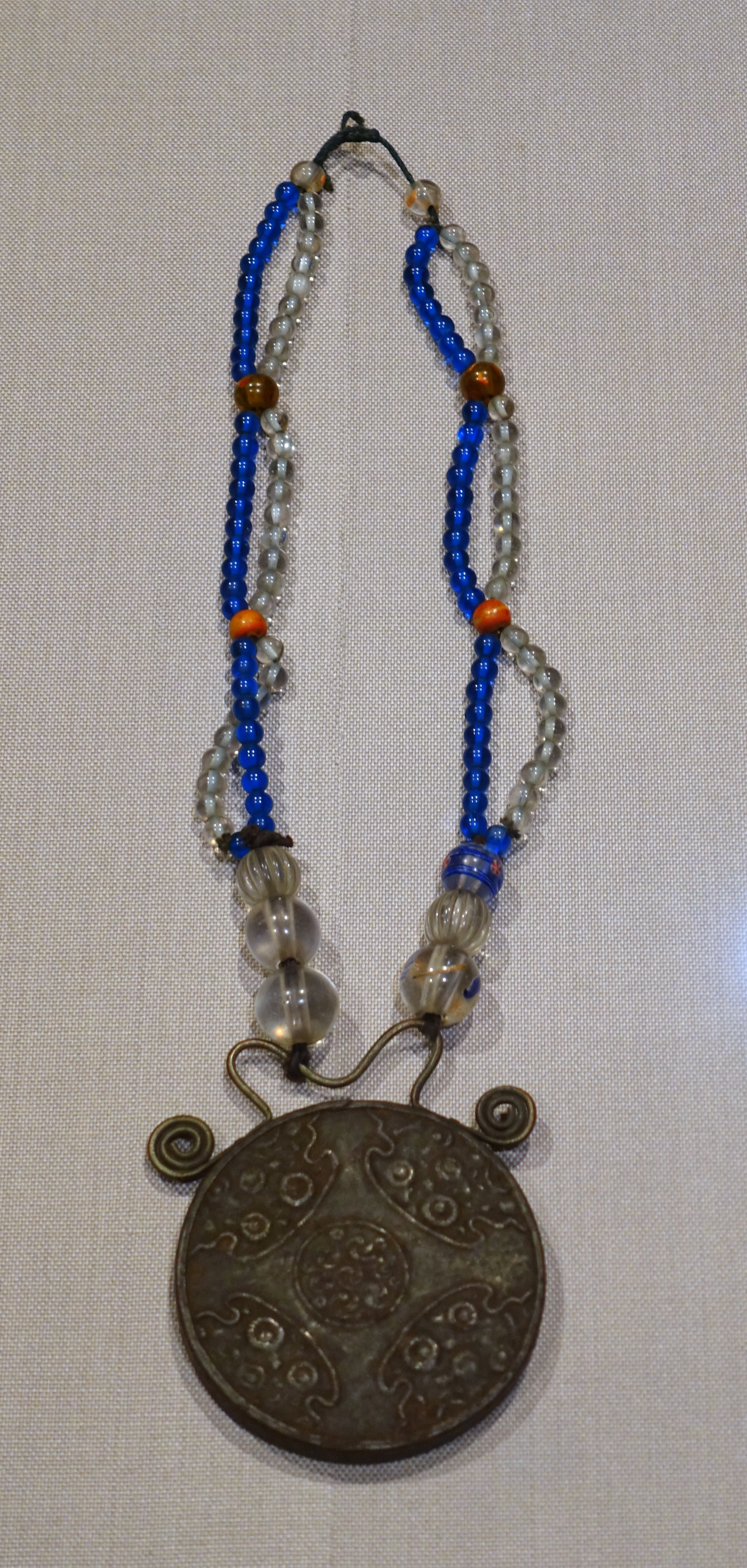
A tamasay displayed in the Tokyo National Museum, Tokyo, Japan

A tamasay (or tamasai) is a bead necklace worn by Ainu women for special occasions.

== History ==
The necklace is called a shitoki if it has a medallion. They are made with large glass beads the Ainu obtained through trading with Chinese merchants. The Ainu also obtained glass beads secretly made by the Matsumae Clan.

== Significance ==
The shitoki medallion often represents the white-tailed sea eagles that the Ainu hunt. The more strands and beads a necklace has, the more valuable it is. The necklaces are passed down through generations and are highly treasured by their owners.

This jewelry is especially important in ceremonies and rituals because it is believed to protect the wearer from evil spirits. In certain Ainu communities, shitoki were used decorate the skulls of deceased bears during the Iomante ceremony.
