= Ainu bark cloth =

Traditional Ainu cloth

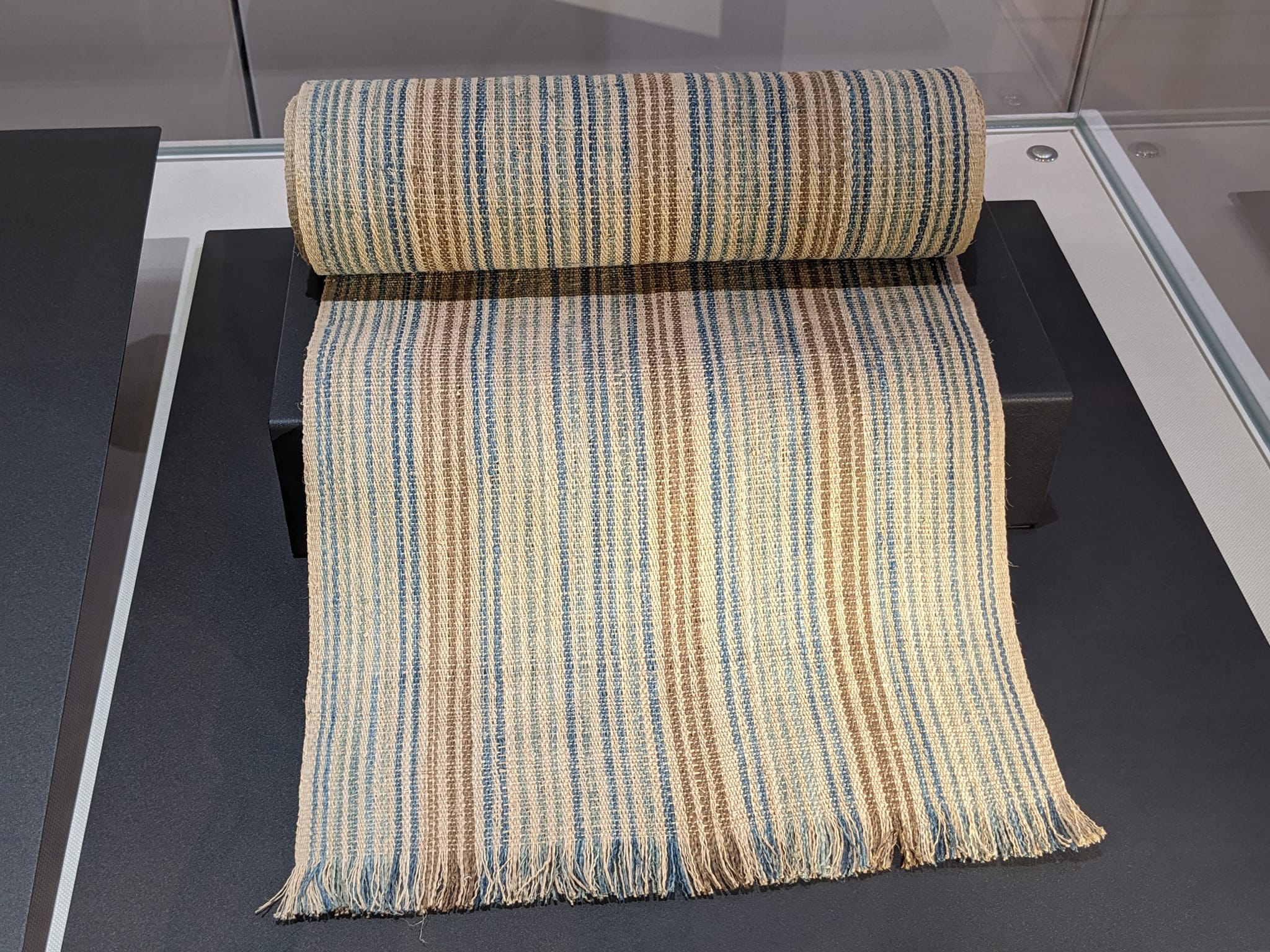
- アットゥㇱ, attus(h)
- Type: Woven fabric; Barkcloth
- Production method: Weaving
- Production process: Handicraft
- Place of origin: Hokkaido, Japan
- Introduced: 18th century
- Manufacturer: Ainu people

Ainu bark cloth (Ainu: アットゥㇱ, attus or attush) is an Ainu culture cloth woven from tree bark fiber (ohyo) made from native Hokkaido trees. It can be considered a variety of woven barkcloth.

== History ==
Ainu bark cloth was first attested in writing in the 18th century during the Edo period by Japanese traders. North and East Hokkaido, Iburi, and the Saru River basin were centers of production. As trade grew, Ainu weavers began to use Japanese cotton for clothmaking. The American Museum of Natural History acquired an Ainu bark cloth coat in 1904. By the mid-20th century, Ainu bark cloth production was minimal, but renewed interest from the mingei movement sparked a renaissance in traditional production.

== Production and use ==
Bark is collected from various Hokkaido trees, chiefly lobed elm and Japanese lime. The inner bark is separated and boiled, then the bast fiber separated and dried into ohyo before being hand spun into twisted yarn. The yarn is traditionally weft using an Ainu backstrap loom (attushi karape), and sewn using masticated ohyo. The final cloth is light-colored, water-resistant and lightweight, but garments can be coarse for wearing, and can become brittle with time.

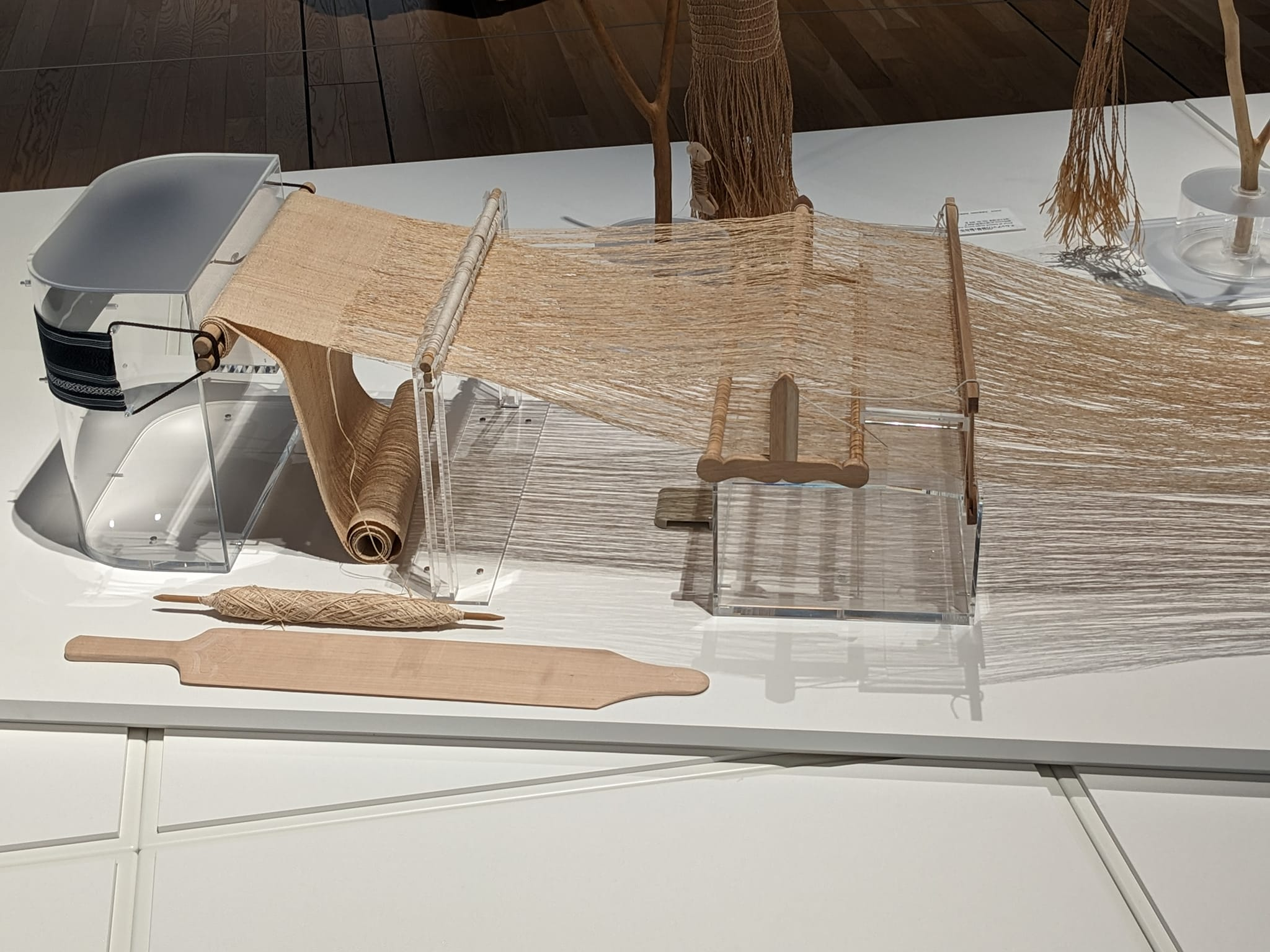
Ainu backstrap loom with paddle and spindle (bottom)

Ainu bark cloth is largely used to make traditional Ainu robes, leggings, and headbands, and also kimono, hanten and obi.

== Nibutani-attus ==
Nibutani district in Biratori, Hokkaido has produced Ainu bark cloth (Nibutani-attus) since at least the 18th century. Nibutani-attus was recognized as a Traditional Craft of Japan by the Ministry of Economy, Trade and Industry on March 8th, 2013.

== See also ==
- Nibutani-ita
