= Kakizaki Hakyo =

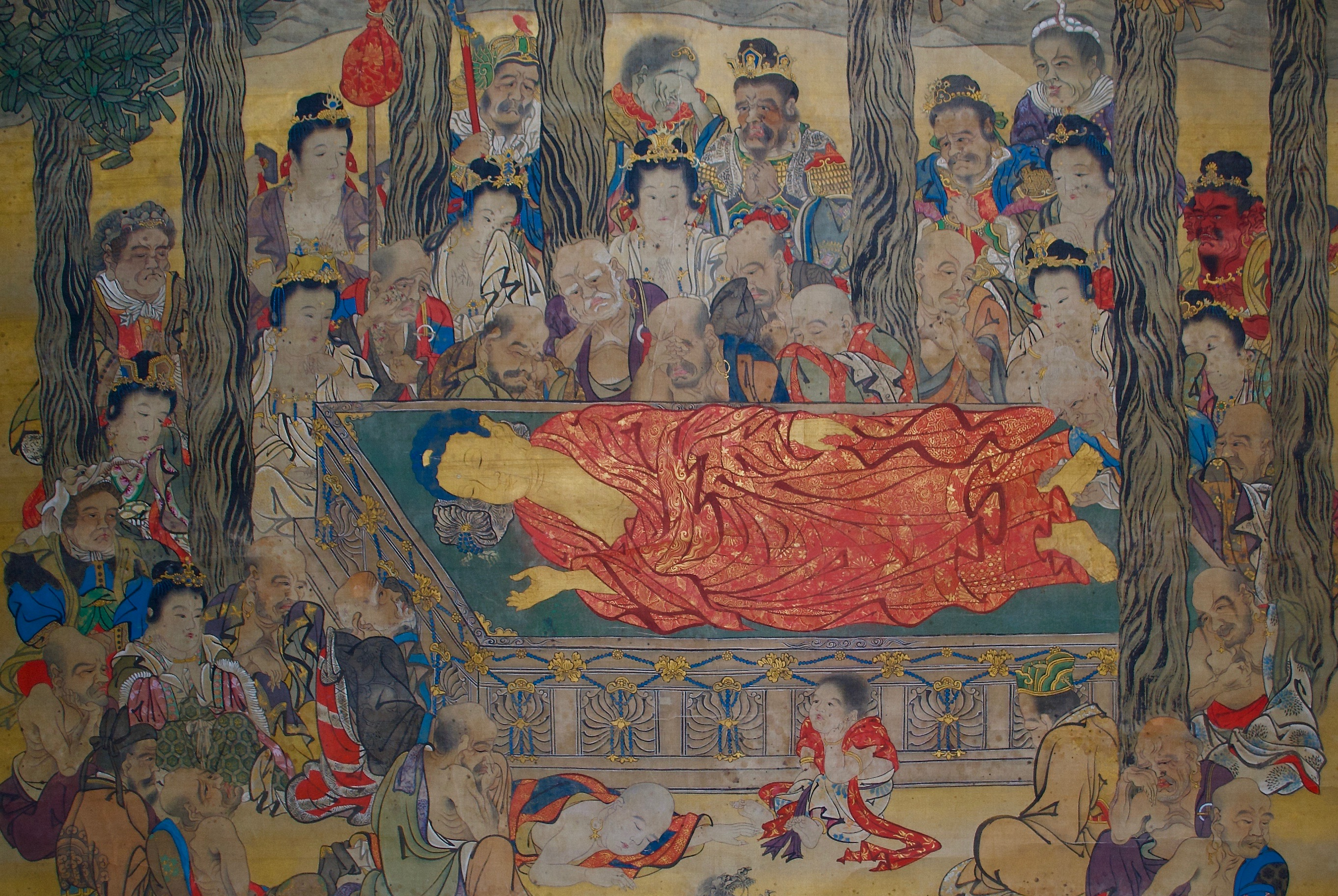
Detail of Kakizaki Hakyō's Butsu nehan-zu (1812), in the possession of Kōryū-ji (高龍寺) in Hakodate

Kakizaki Hakyō (蠣崎 波響, June 25, 1764 – July 26, 1826) was a Japanese samurai artist from the Matsumae clan. His first success was a group of 12 portraits called the Ishu Retsuzo. The portraits were of 12 Ainu chiefs from the northern area of Ezo, now Hokkaido.

== Biography ==
Kakizaki Hakyō was born in Matsumae Castle in 1764, the fifth son of the Matsumae Domain daimyō Matsumae Sugehiro (松前資広). The following year he was adopted as successor by karō (chief retainer or house elder) Kakizaki Hiromasa (蠣崎将監広当). At a young age he travelled to Edo, where he studied under Takebe Ayatari (Ryōtai) (建部凌岱) and Sō Shiseki, learning the style of the Nanpin school. In the aftermath of the Menashi–Kunashir rebellion, he painted the Ishū Retsuzō (夷酋列像), portraits of twelve Ainu chiefs who had sided with the Matsumae Domain; this series was presented to Emperor Kōkaku. In 1791 he journeyed to Kyōto, where he studied under Maruyama Ōkyo. His style was influenced by his exchanges with the painters and literati of the Maruyama-Shijō school and he became friends with Minagawa Kien (皆川淇園), Murase Kōtei (村瀬栲亭), and in particular Rikunyo (六如), with whom he hosted a moon-viewing party for Kan Chazan (菅茶山), attended also by Ban Kōkei (伴蒿蹊). From 1807, when the Matsumae clan were transferred to the Yanagawa Domain (梁川藩), based around Yanagawa in Mutsu Province, Kakizaki Hakyō as karō worked for their reinstatement. In 1826, after falling ill in Edo, he died in his home town of Matsumae.

== See also ==
- List of Cultural Properties of Japan - paintings (Hokkaidō)
- Ainu genre painting
