= Yanagawa Domain (Mutsu) =

Yanagawa Domain 梁川藩
- under Tokugawa shogunate Japan
- Area
  - Coordinates: 37°51′18″N 140°36′40″E
  - Type: Han
- Historical era: Edo period
- Today part of: Fukushima Prefecture

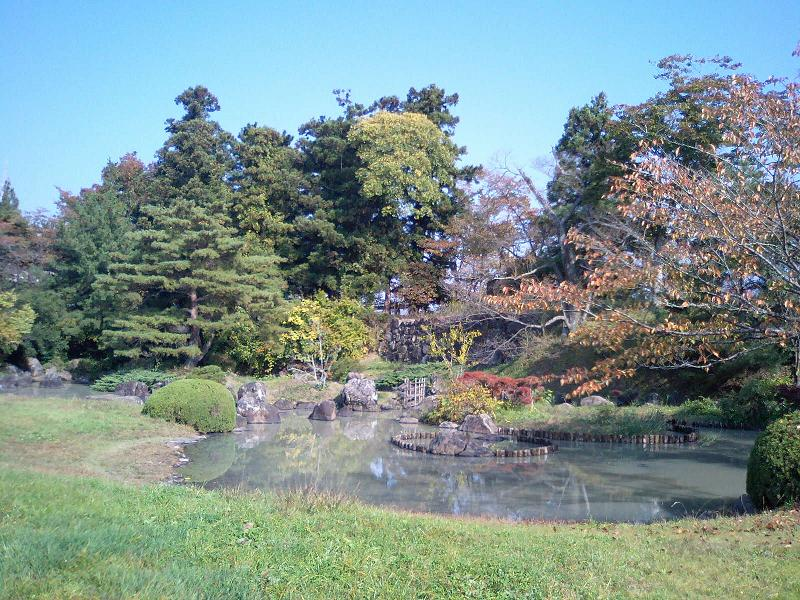
Site of Yanagawa Castle (梁川城) in Yanagawa, now Date, Fukushima Prefecture

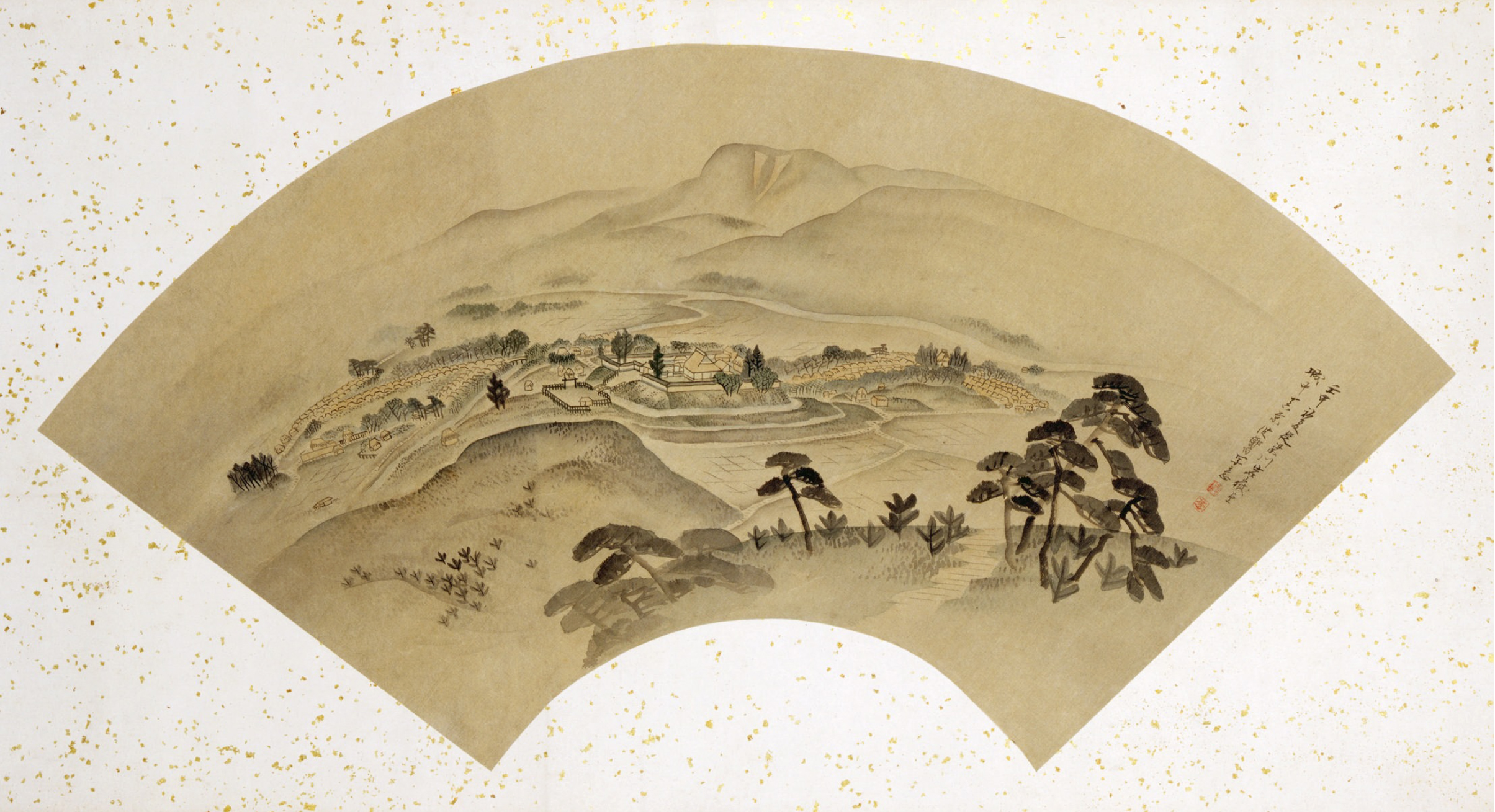
From Eight Views of Yanagawa (1812), by Kakizaki Hakyō (Hakodate City Central Library)

Yanagawa Domain (梁川藩, Yanagawa-han) was an intermittent and short-lived feudal domain in Edo period Japan, located in Mutsu Province, in Yanagawa, now the city of Date, Fukushima Prefecture.

== History ==
The domain was created in Tenna 3 (1683), with Matsudaira Yoshimasa, third son of Tokugawa Mitsutomo, its first daimyō. After third lord Matsudaira Yoshizane died in 1727 without heir, the domain briefly lapsed, but four months later was renewed under Matsudaira Michiharu, seventh son of Tokugawa Tsunanari, before being abolished the following year, the territory reverting to the bakufu. Eighty years later, in 1807, Matsumae Akihiro was transferred from Ezo-chi to the recreated domain, where the clan was based until his return to Matsumae in 1821, at which point the domain was once again abolished, this time for good, the territory reverting once more to the bakufu.

== List of daimyō ==
- Matsudaira clan 1683–1728

#	Name	Tenure	Courtesy title	Court Rank	kokudaka
1	Matsudaira Yoshimasa (松平義昌)	1683–			30,000 koku
2	Matsudaira Yoshikata (松平義方)				30,000 koku
3	Matsudaira Yoshizane (松平義真)	–1727			30,000 koku
4	Matsudaira Michiharu (松平通春)	1727–1728			30,000 koku

- Matsumae clan 1807–1821

#	Name	Tenure	Courtesy title	Court Rank	kokudaka
1	Matsumae Akihiro (松前章広)	1807–1821			9,000 koku
