= Ōtani Hongan-ji Hakodate Betsu-in =

Buddhist temple in Hokkaido, Japan

Ōtani Hongan-ji Hakodate Betsu-in 大谷派本願寺函館別院
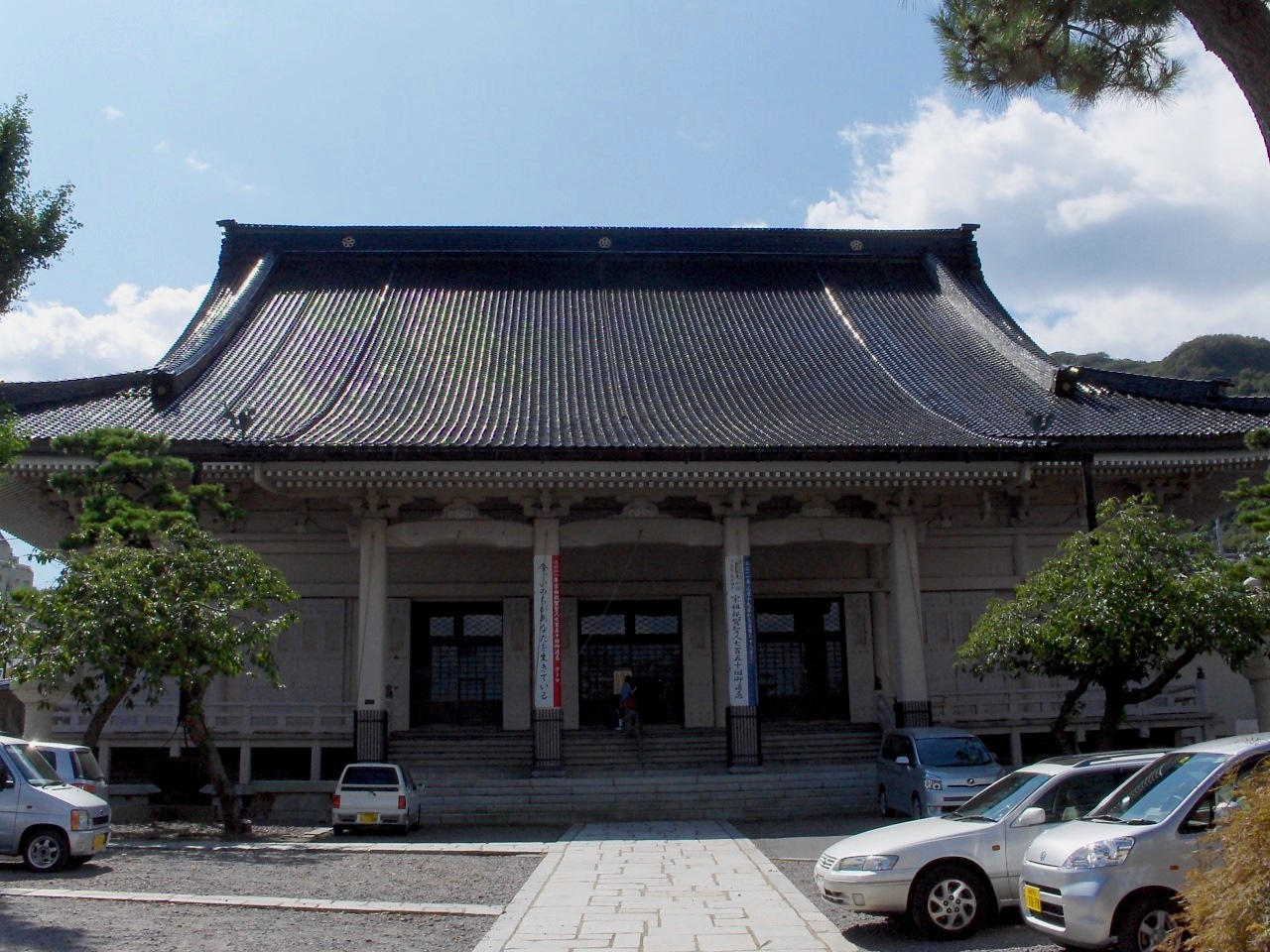
- Hondō (1915), Important Cultural Property

Religion
- Affiliation: Jōdo Shinshū Ōtani-ha
- Status: Betsu-in

Location
- Location: 16-15 Motomachi, Hakodate, Hokkaidō
- Country: Japan
- Interactive map of Ōtani Hongan-ji Hakodate Betsu-in 大谷派本願寺函館別院
- Coordinates: 41°45′46.85″N 140°42′49.5″E

Architecture
- Founder: Jōgen
- Completed: 1641

Ōtani Hongan-ji Hakodate Betsu-in (大谷派本願寺函館別院) is a branch temple of Higashi Hongan-ji in Hakodate, Hokkaidō, Japan. Rebuilt after a fire in 1907, it is the first temple in Japan built with reinforced concrete. The Hondō (1915), Shōrō (1912–1925), and Shōmon (1912–1925) have all been designated Important Cultural Properties.

== See also ==
- Japanese Buddhist architecture
- Important Cultural Properties of Japan
