= Hakodate City Museum =

- 市立函館博物館
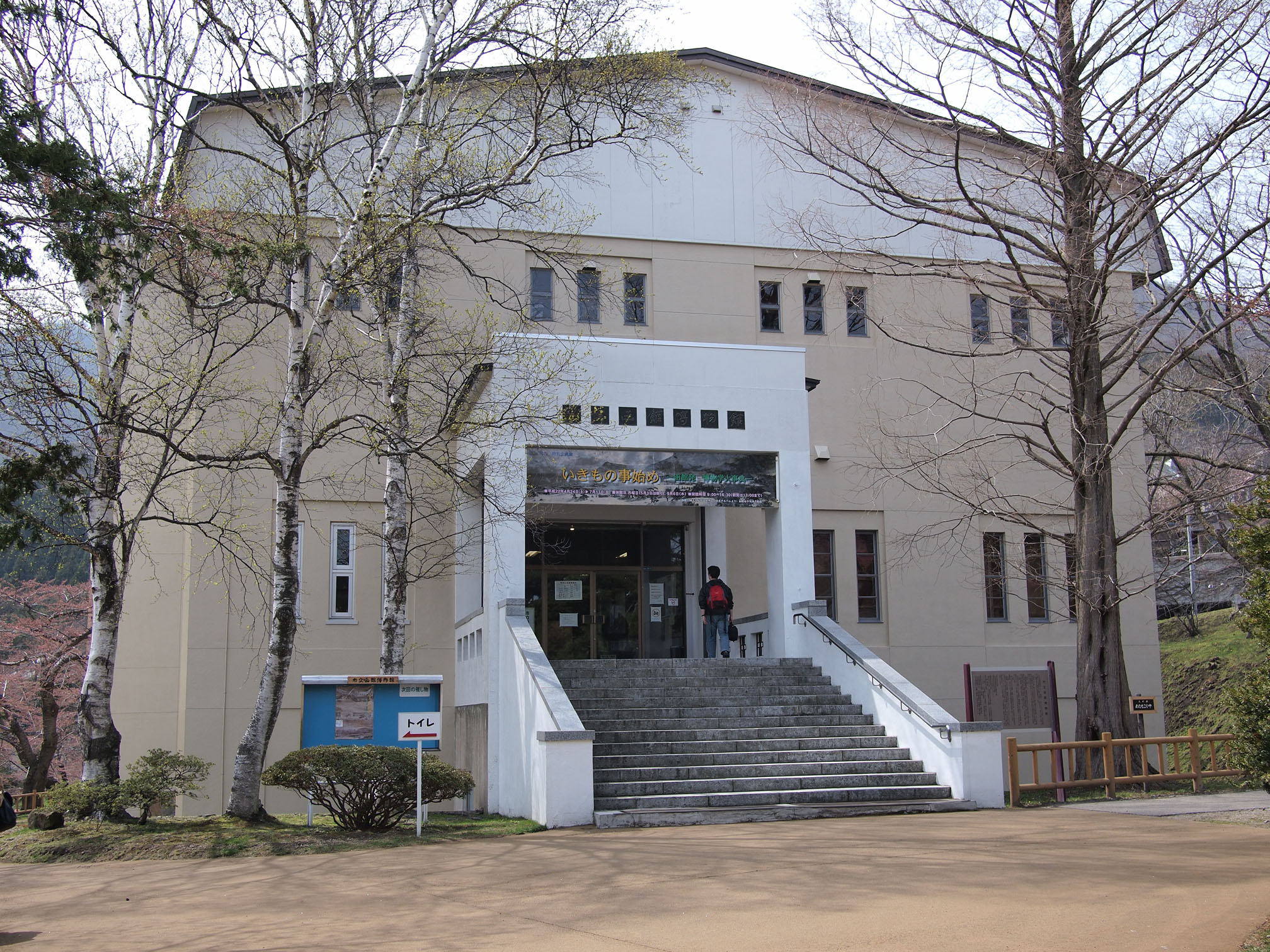
- Interactive map of the Hakodate City Museum area

General information
- Location: 17-1 Aoyagi-chō, Hakodate, Hokkaidō, Japan
- Coordinates: 41°45′21″N 140°42′53″E
- Opened: May 1879
- Renovated: April 1966

Website
- Official website

Hakodate City Museum (市立函館博物館, Shiritsu Hakodate Hakubutsukan) is a museum of history and natural history in Hakodate Park, Hakodate, Hokkaidō, Japan. The forerunner of the current museum, the Hakodate Provisional Museum, building one, opened in May 1879, the second building in 1884, and the third building (later demolished) in 1891. In 1932 the first building became the Fisheries Pavilion and the second the Indigenous Peoples Pavilion. Legislation to create the current museum was passed in 1948, and the Hakodate City Museum opened in April 1966.

== Gallery ==
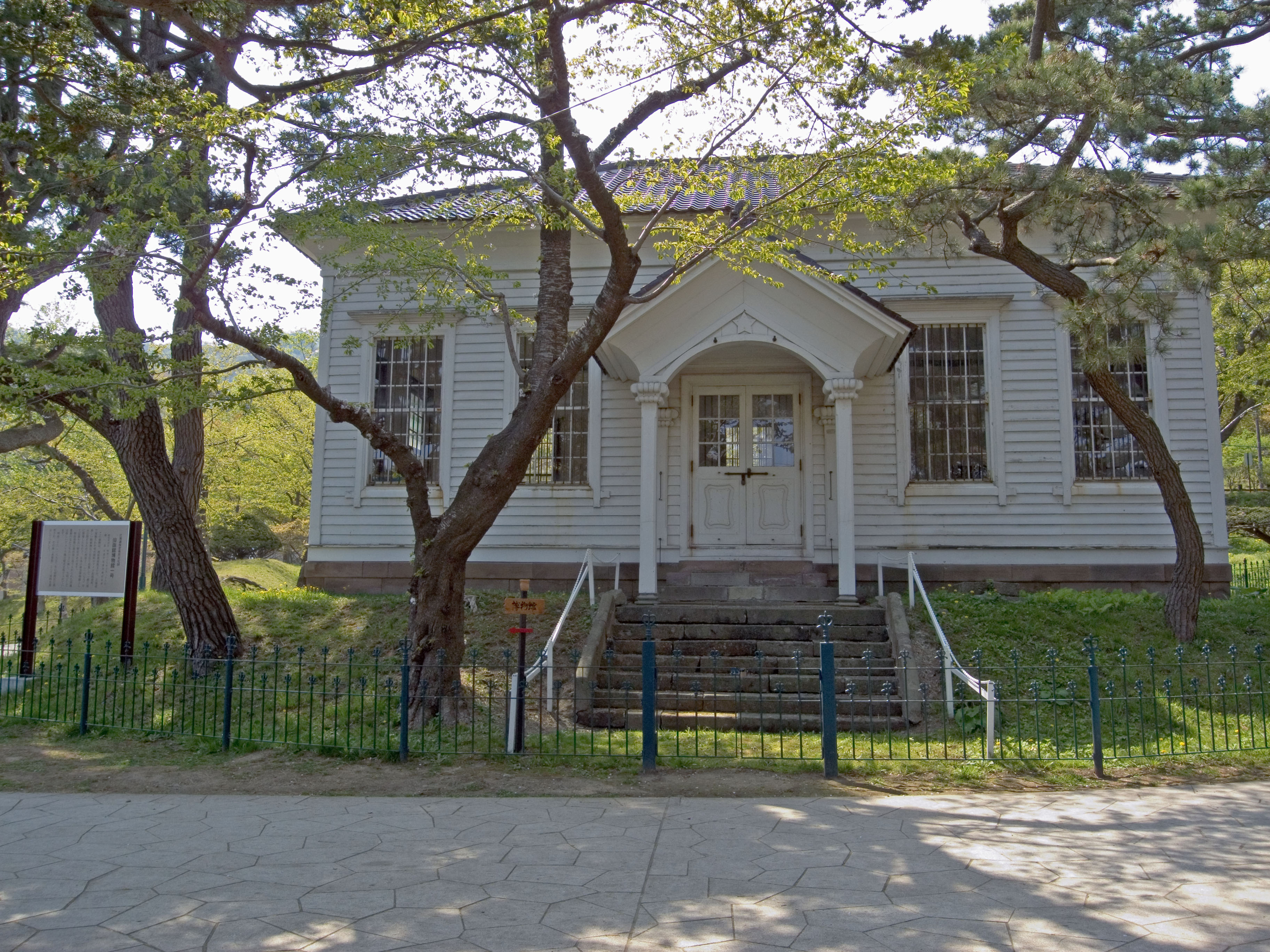
Former First Museum Building

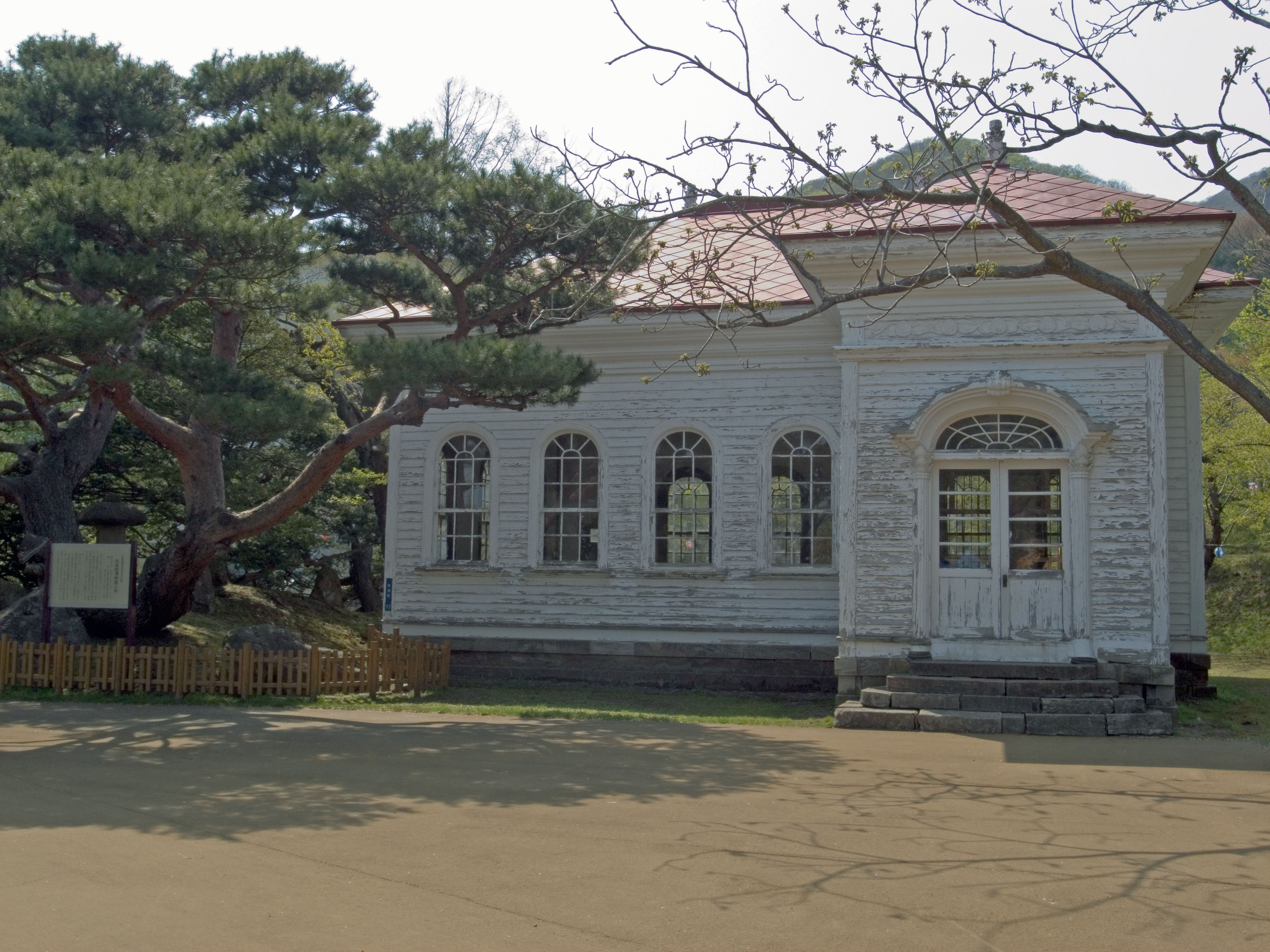
Former Second Museum Building

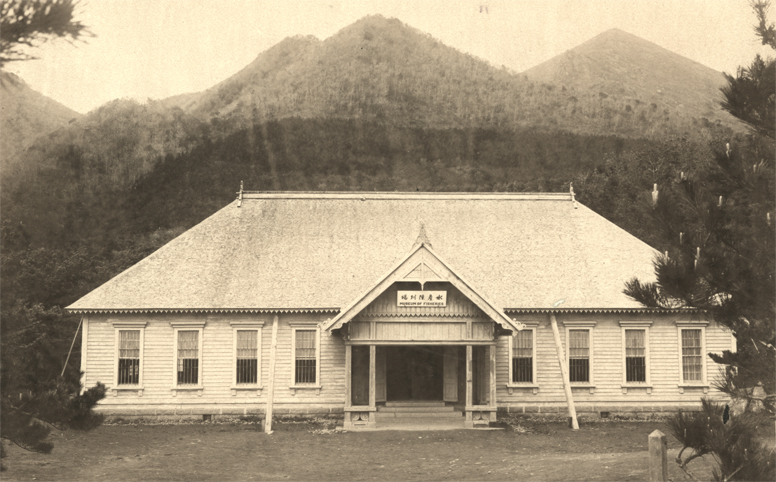
Former Third Museum Building

== See also ==
- Hakodate City Museum of Northern Peoples
- List of Cultural Properties of Japan - paintings (Hokkaidō)
- List of Cultural Properties of Japan - historical materials (Hokkaidō)
- Shiryōkaku
