= Adam Laxman =

Finnish–Swedish military officer

Adam Kirillovich (Erikovich) Laxman
- Адам Кириллович (Эрикович) Лаксман
- Born: 1766; Barnaul, Russian Empire
- Died: 1806?
- Occupation: Military officer
- Father: Erik Laxmann

Adam Kirillovich (Erikovich) Laxman (Russian: Адам Кириллович (Эрикович) Лаксман) (1766 – 1806?) was a Finnish–Swedish military officer and one of the first subjects of Imperial Russia to set foot in Japan. A lieutenant in the Imperial Russian military, he was commissioned to lead an expedition to Japan in 1791, returning two Japanese castaways to their home country in exchange for trade concessions from the Tokugawa shogunate. He was the son of Erik Laxmann.

== Expedition to Japan (1792) ==
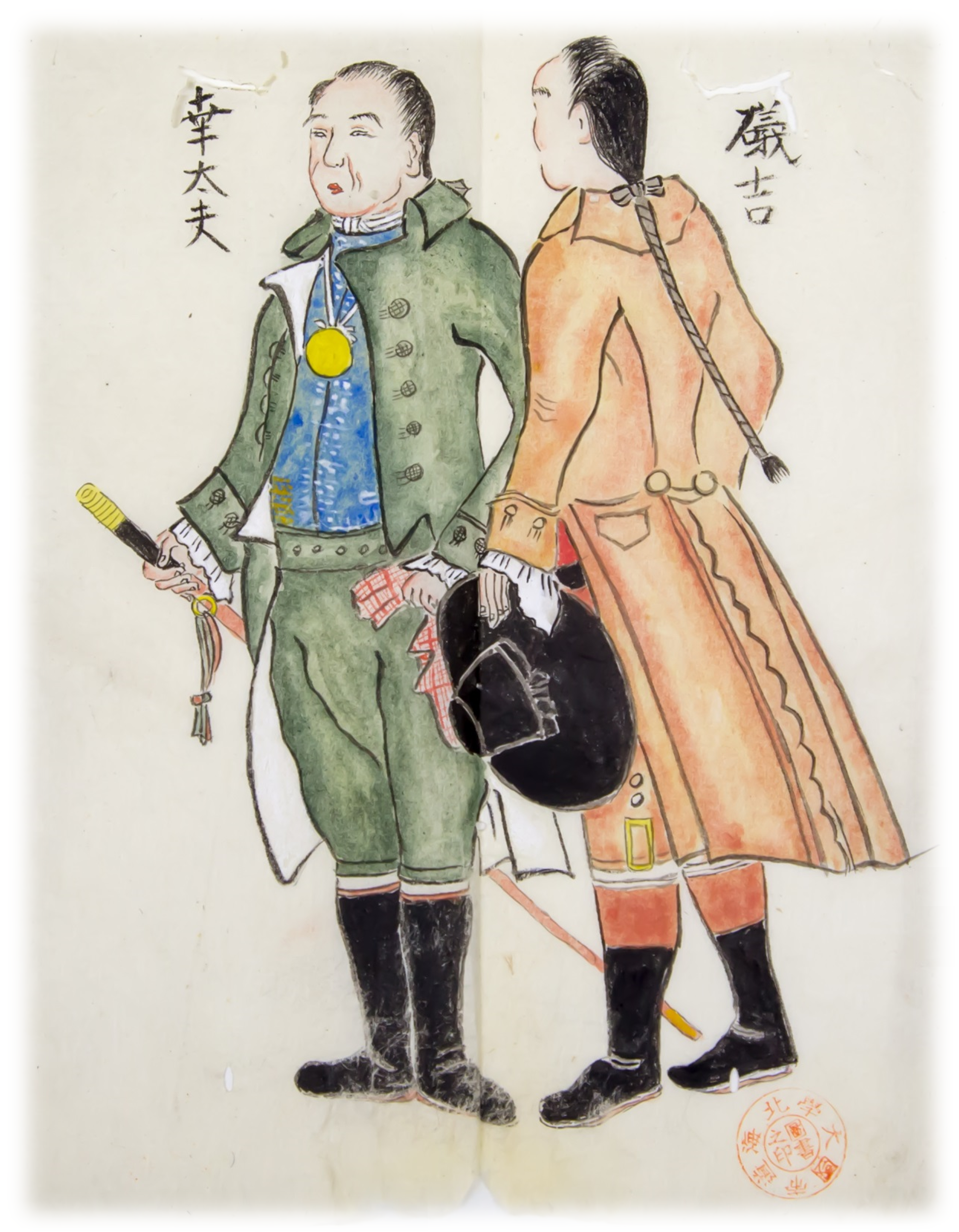
Daikokuya Kōdayū (大黒屋光太夫) and Isokichi (磯吉): two Japanese castaways returned by Adam Laxman in 1792.

Laxman landed on Hokkaidō on 9 October 1792, where he was met by members of the Matsumae clan, who were entrusted with defending Japan's northern borders. Unlike previous foreign visitors, Laxman was treated hospitably, but this changed when he demanded, imprudently, that he be able to deliver the castaways (Daikokuya Kōdayū's party) to Edo (modern-day Tokyo) in person. He was soon met by two envoys and five hundred men, sent from Edo by senior councilor Matsudaira Sadanobu, who attempted to delay or prevent Laxman's traveling much deeper into Japanese territory. They asked that he travel to the town of Matsumae, overland and without his ship. Laxman refused, and ultimately was allowed to sail, with Japanese naval escort, to the port of Hakodate; from there, 450 Russians and Japanese would march to Matsumae Castle.

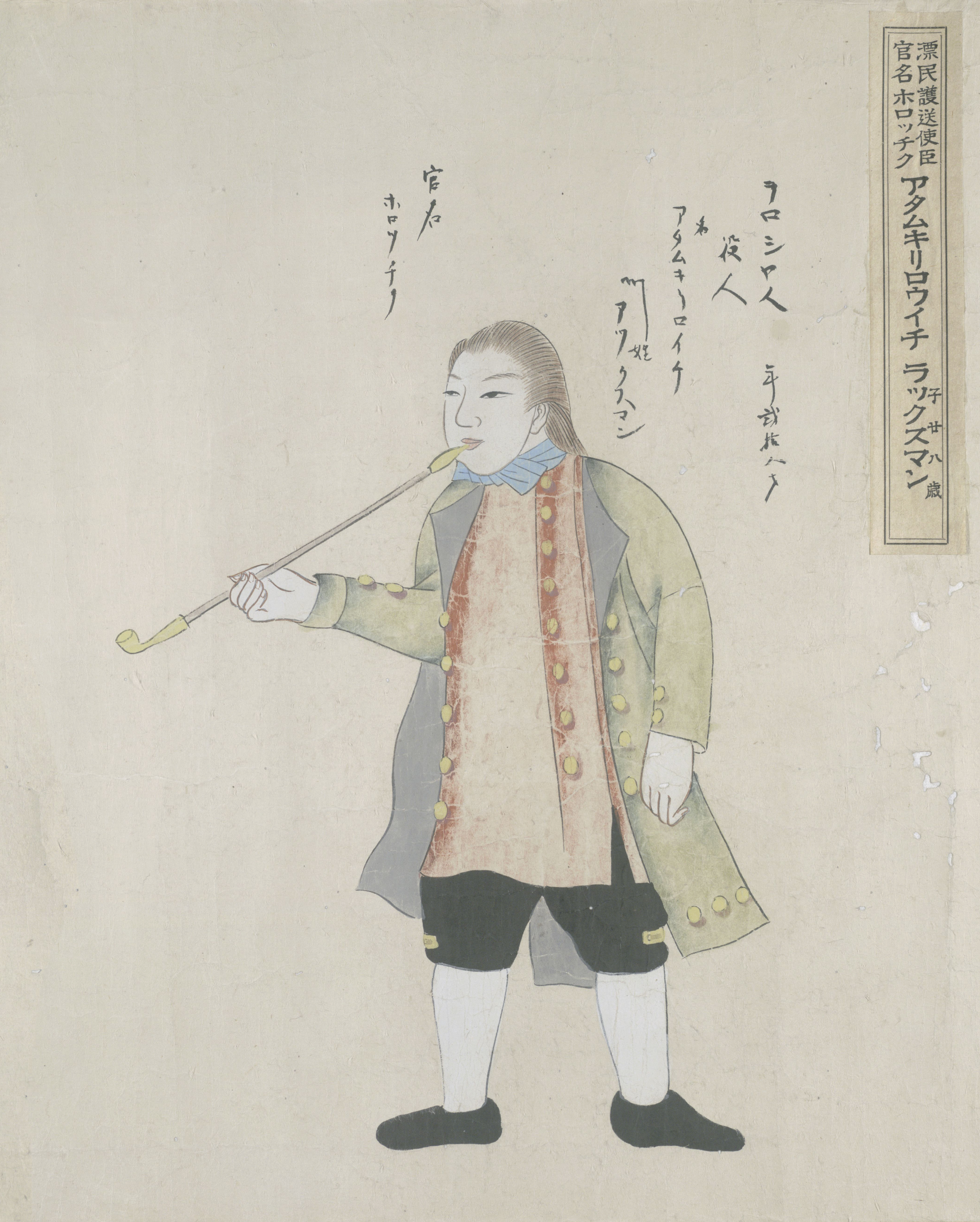
Adam Laxman, from a 1793 Japanese painting of members of his expedition (Hakodate City Central Library)

Oddly, despite his impudence, Laxman was granted lavish Western-style living quarters; they were allowed to ignore the custom of kneeling and bowing before the Shogun's envoys, and were presented with three samurai swords and a hundred bags of rice. The envoys then explained to him that Japanese law demanded that all foreign trade be performed at Nagasaki. Since he had come to return castaways, they explained, he would be allowed to leave peacefully. When Laxman refused to leave without a trade agreement, he was provided with papers that explicitly stated that Nagasaki would welcome one Russian ship, that foreign ships were not allowed to dock anywhere else in the country, and that Christianity would also not be tolerated anywhere in Japan.

Laxman returned to Russia essentially empty-handed, though he held (quite possibly) the first official Japanese documents granting permission to trade, to a nation other than China, Korea or the Netherlands. In 1804–1805, nine years after Laxman's return to Russia, an attempt was made to trade at Nagasaki as part of the expedition around the world led by Adam Johann von Krusenstern, but the Russian ambassador Nikolai Rezanov was greeted with a lengthy dispatch from the Shogunate explaining that Japan was closed to foreign trade and demanding that they leave. After this major setback, the Tsarist government debated for many years the actual intention and meaning of the documents, and, leaving the opening of Japan to private entrepreneur explorers, ultimately failed to open Japan.

== Gallery ==
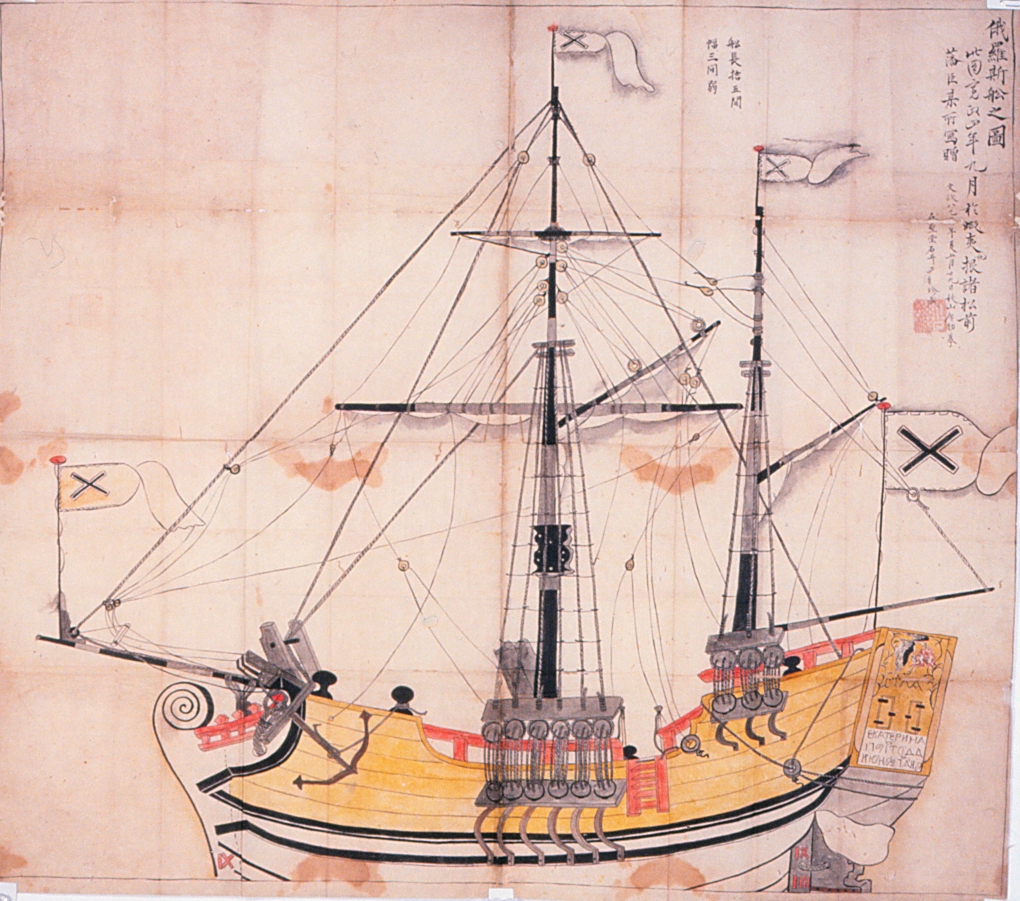
Ekaterina, the ship upon which Adam Laxman sailed to Japan (Nemuro City Museum of History and Nature)

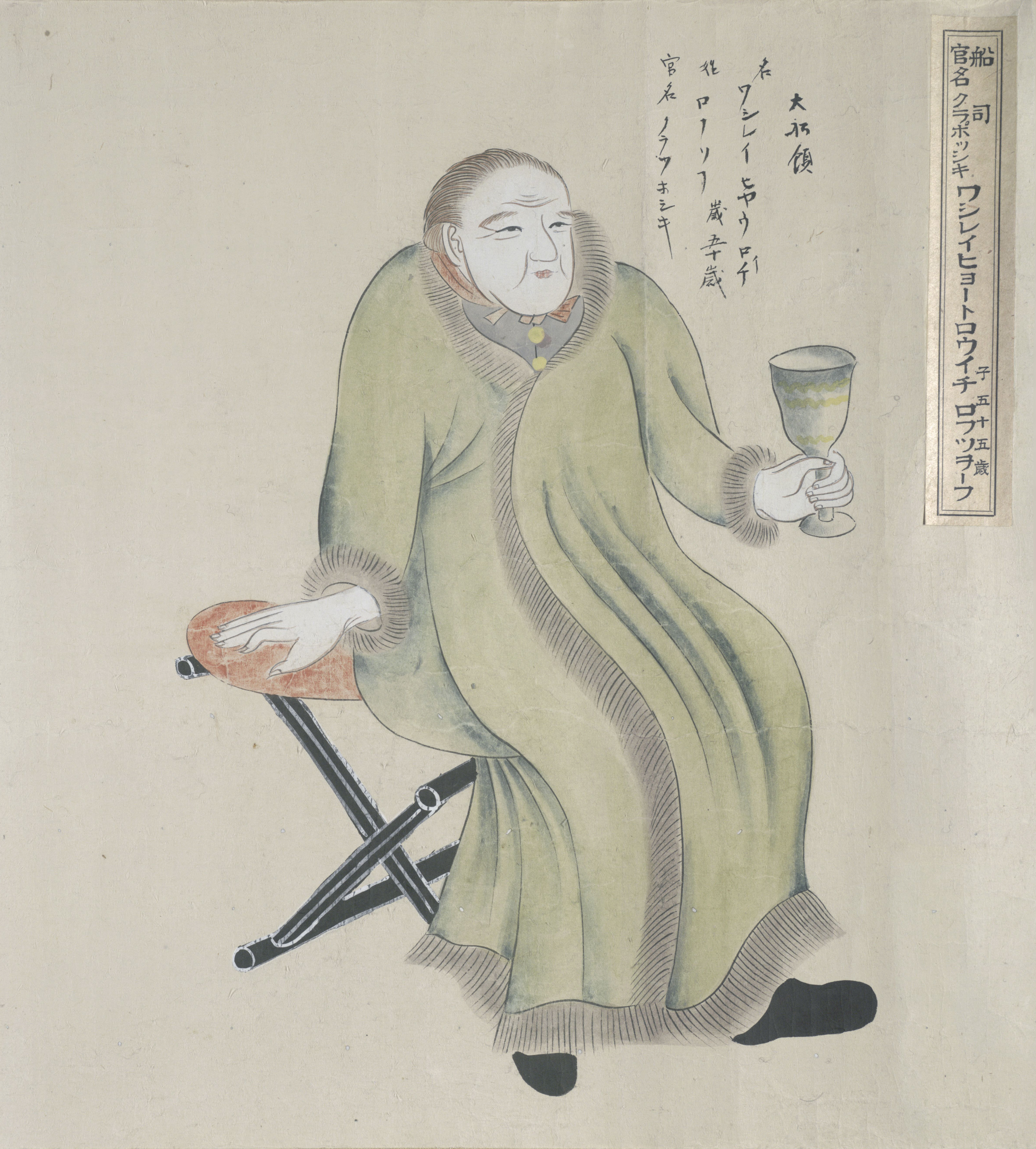
Vasilii Fedorovich Lovtsov, captain of Ekaterina (Hakodate City Central Library)

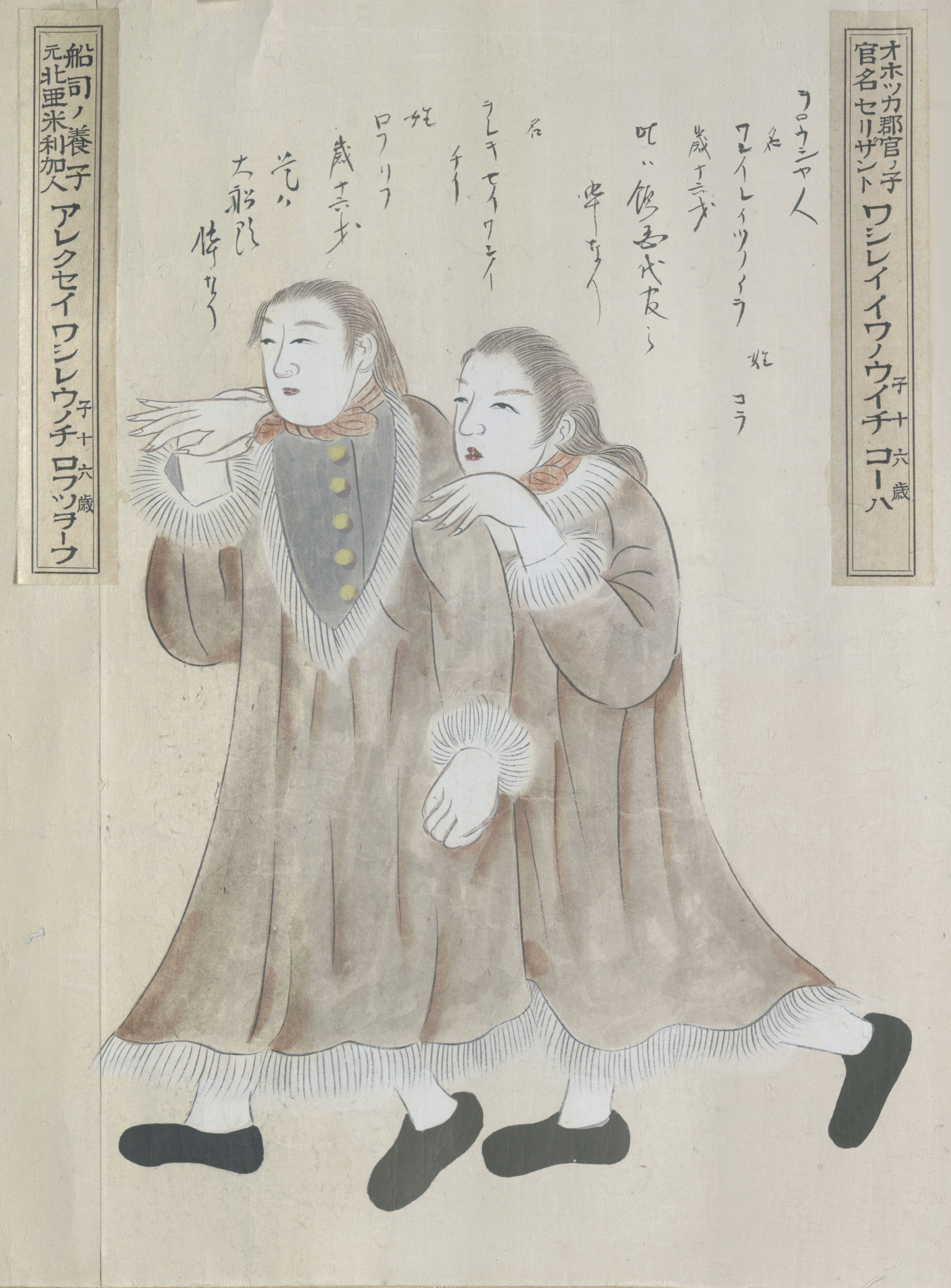
Alexei, adopted son of Captain Lovtsov, and Vasilii Ivanovich Kokh, son of the Commandant of Okhotsk (Hakodate City Central Library)

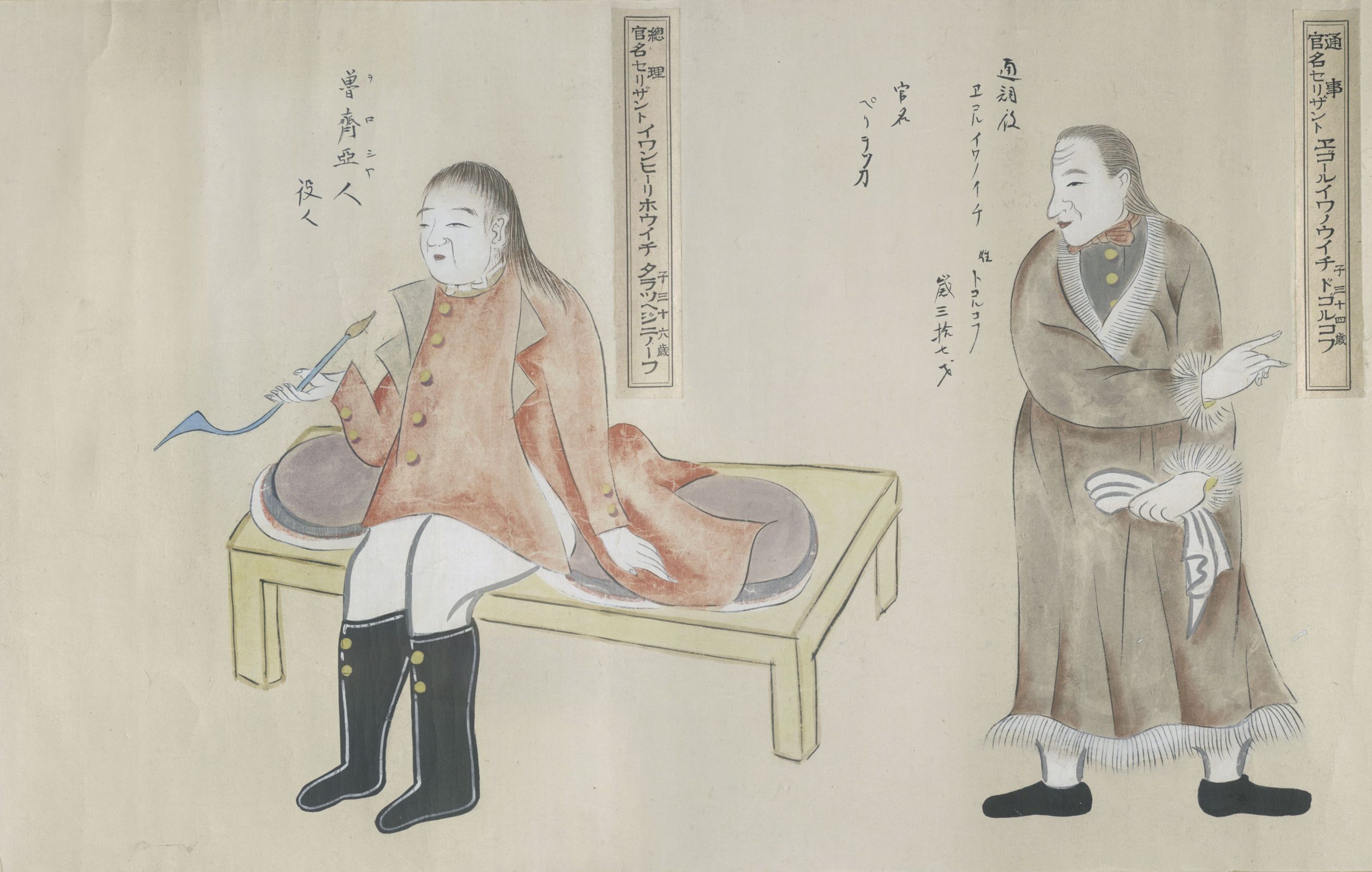
Sergeant-surveyor Trapeznikov and the interpreter Tugolukov (Hakodate City Central Library)

== See also ==
- Sakoku
- Empire of Japan–Russian Empire relations
- Dembei, Gonza, Sanemon
- List of Westerners who visited Japan before 1868
