= Pride of India =

Pride of India or Pride-of-India is a common name for several plants and may refer to:

- Koelreuteria paniculata - Also known as goldenrain tree or China tree
- Lagerstroemia speciosa - Also known as Lagerstroemia crape myrtle, crape myrtle, crepe myrtle, crapemyrtle, crepemyrtle, giant crape-myrtle, Queen's crape-myrtle or banabá plant
- Melia azedarach - Also known as chinaberry, Persian lilac, white cedar, Texas umbrella, bead-tree, Cape lilac, Ceylon cedar, bead-tree or Cape lilac

== See also ==
- Bhuj: The Pride of India, a 2021 Indian film by Abhishek Dudhaiya about the Indo-Pakistani war of 1971
- Pride of Indian Cinema, a nickname for the 2022 Indian film RRR
