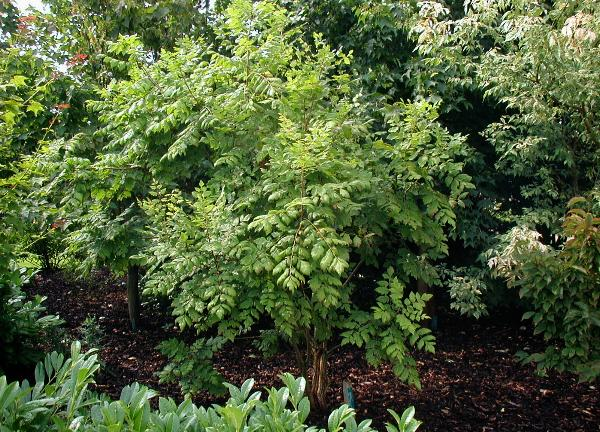
- Koelreuteria paniculata

Scientific classification
- Kingdom: Plantae
- Clade: Tracheophytes
- Clade: Angiosperms
- Clade: Eudicots
- Clade: Rosids
- Order: Sapindales
- Family: Sapindaceae
- Subfamily: Sapindoideae
- Genus: Koelreuteria; Laxm.

Type species
- Koelreuteria paniculata Laxm.

Species
- Koelreuteria bipinnata Franch.; Koelreuteria elegans (Seem.) A.C.Sm.; Koelreuteria paniculata Laxm.

= Koelreuteria =

Koelreuteria Temporal range: Early Eocene to present

Genus of flowering plants

Koelreuteria /kɛlrʊˈtɪəriə/, also known as chinese lantern tree, is a genus of three species of flowering plants in the family Sapindaceae, native to southern and eastern Asia, as well as the island of Fiji. Many fossil species are also known, suggesting that this genus had a wider range in the past.

== Description ==
They are medium-sized deciduous trees growing to 10–20 m (33–66 ft) tall, with spirally arranged pinnate or bipinnate leaves. The flowers are small and yellow, produced in large branched panicles 20–50 cm (8–20 in) long. The fruit is a three-lobed inflated papery capsule 3–6 cm long, containing several hard nut-like seeds 5–10 mm diameter.

== Taxonomy ==
The first Koelreuteria taxonomy was published by Erik Laxmann in 1772. The type species is Koelreuteria paniculata Laxm.

=== Evolution ===
Fossil remains of Koelreuteria are known from the Early Eocene of North America and the Pliocene of Europe, suggesting that they originally had a circumboreal distribution. Climactic changes led to their extirpation from North America after the Eocene and in Europe after the Neogene, leaving only the East Asian species. K. elegans arrived to Fiji and Taiwan via long-distance dispersal.

=== Species ===
The genus has three accepted species:

- Koelreuteria bipinnata Franch. (Chinese flame tree)
- Koelreuteria elegans (Seem.) A.C.Sm. (Taiwanese goldenrain tree)
- Koelreuteria paniculata Laxm. (goldenrain tree)

The following fossil species are also known:

- †Koelreuteria allenii (Lesq.) W. N. Edwards (early to late Eocene of the western United States)
- †Koelreuteria dilcheri Qi Wang, Manchester, H.-J. Gregor, S. Shen et Z. Y. Li (Eocene of the western United States)
- †Koelreuteria kvacekii Chen et al (early-mid Eocene of the Tibetan Plateau, China)
- †Koelreuteria lunpolaensis Jiang et al (Oligocene of Tibetan Plateau, China)
- †Koelreuteria macroptera (Kováts) W. N. Edwards (late Oligocene to early Pliocene of Europe)
- †Koelreuteria miointegrifoliola Hu et R. W. Chaney (Miocene of eastern Asia)
- †Koelreuteria quasipaniculata Li et al (Miocene of the Tibetan Plateau, China)
- †Koelreuteria taoana Qi Wang, Manchester, H.-J. Gregor, S. Shen et Z. Y. Li (Eocene of northeastern China and eastern Russia)
- †Koelreuteria yuanmouensis Li, Yin, Mehrotra et Cheng (Pliocene of China)

== Etymology ==
The genus was named after Joseph Gottlieb Kölreuter (1733-1806), from Karlsruhe, Germany, by Erich Laxmann.

== Uses ==
Koelreuteria are commonly used as focal points in landscape design in regions where they thrive.

In some areas, notably parts of eastern North America, they have become invasive species.
