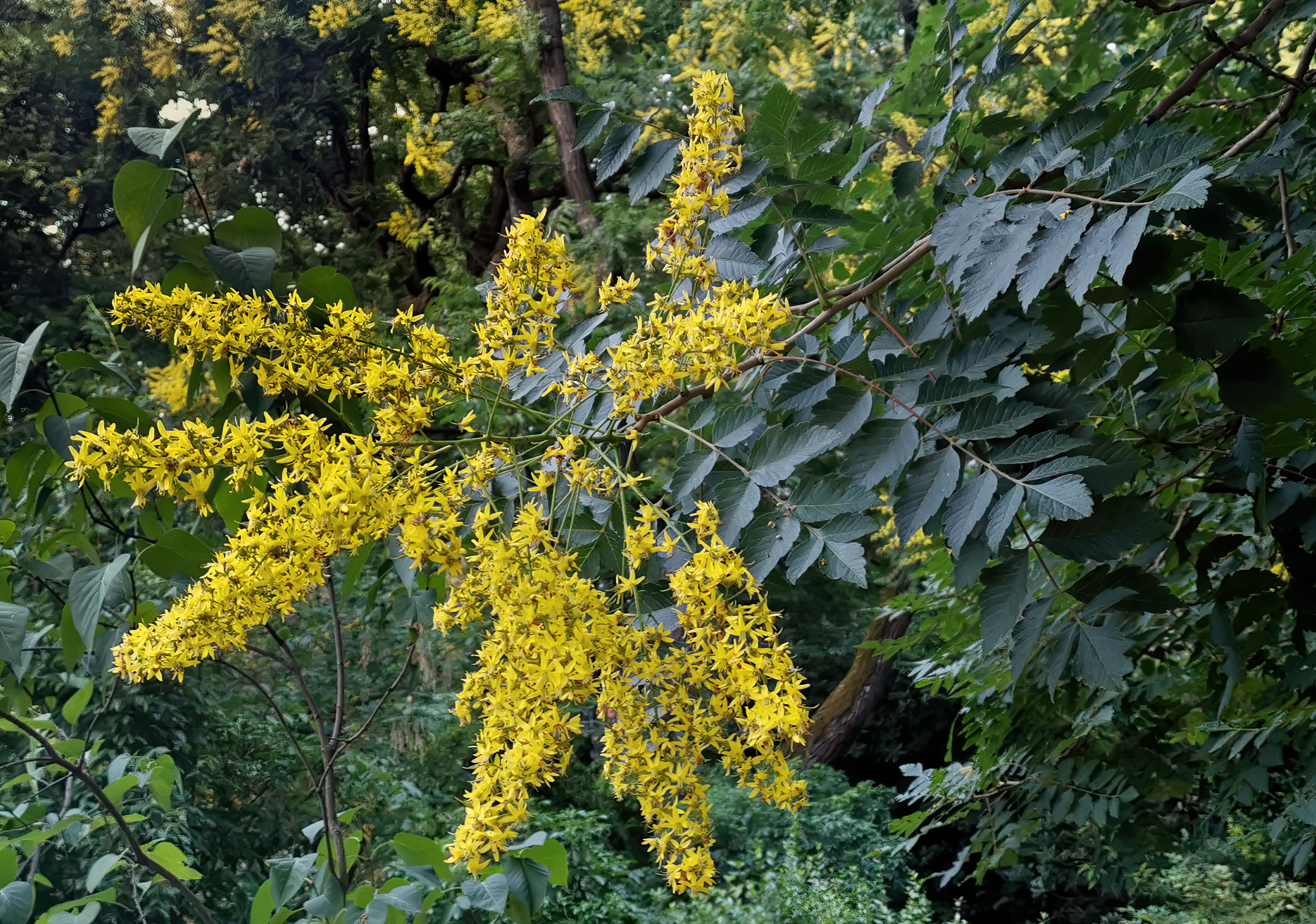
- Foliage and flowers of Koelreuteria paniculata var. apiculata

Conservation status
- Least Concern (IUCN 3.1)

Scientific classification
- Kingdom: Plantae
- Clade: Tracheophytes
- Clade: Angiosperms
- Clade: Eudicots
- Clade: Rosids
- Order: Sapindales
- Family: Sapindaceae
- Genus: Koelreuteria
- Species: K. paniculata

Binomial name
- Koelreuteria paniculata Laxm.

Synonyms
- List: Sapindus paniculata (Laxm.) Dum.Cours.; Koelreuteria apiculata Rehder & E.H.Wilson; Koelreuteria bipinnata var. apiculata (Rehder & E.H.Wilson) F.C.How & C.N.Ho; Koelreuteria chinensis (L.) Hoffmanns.; Koelreuteria japonica Hassk.; Koelreuteria paniculata var. apiculata (Rehder & E.H.Wilson) Rehder; Koelreuteria paniculata var. fastigiata Bean; Koelreuteria paniculata f. fastigiata (Bean) Rehder; Koelreuteria paniculata var. lixianensis H.L.Tsiang; Koelreuteria paniculata f. miyagiensis H.Ohashi & Yu.Sasaki; Koelreuteria paullinoides L'Hér.; Paullinia aurea Radlk.; Sapindus chinensis L.; Sapindus sinensis J.F.Gmel.

= Koelreuteria paniculata =

Species of flowering plant

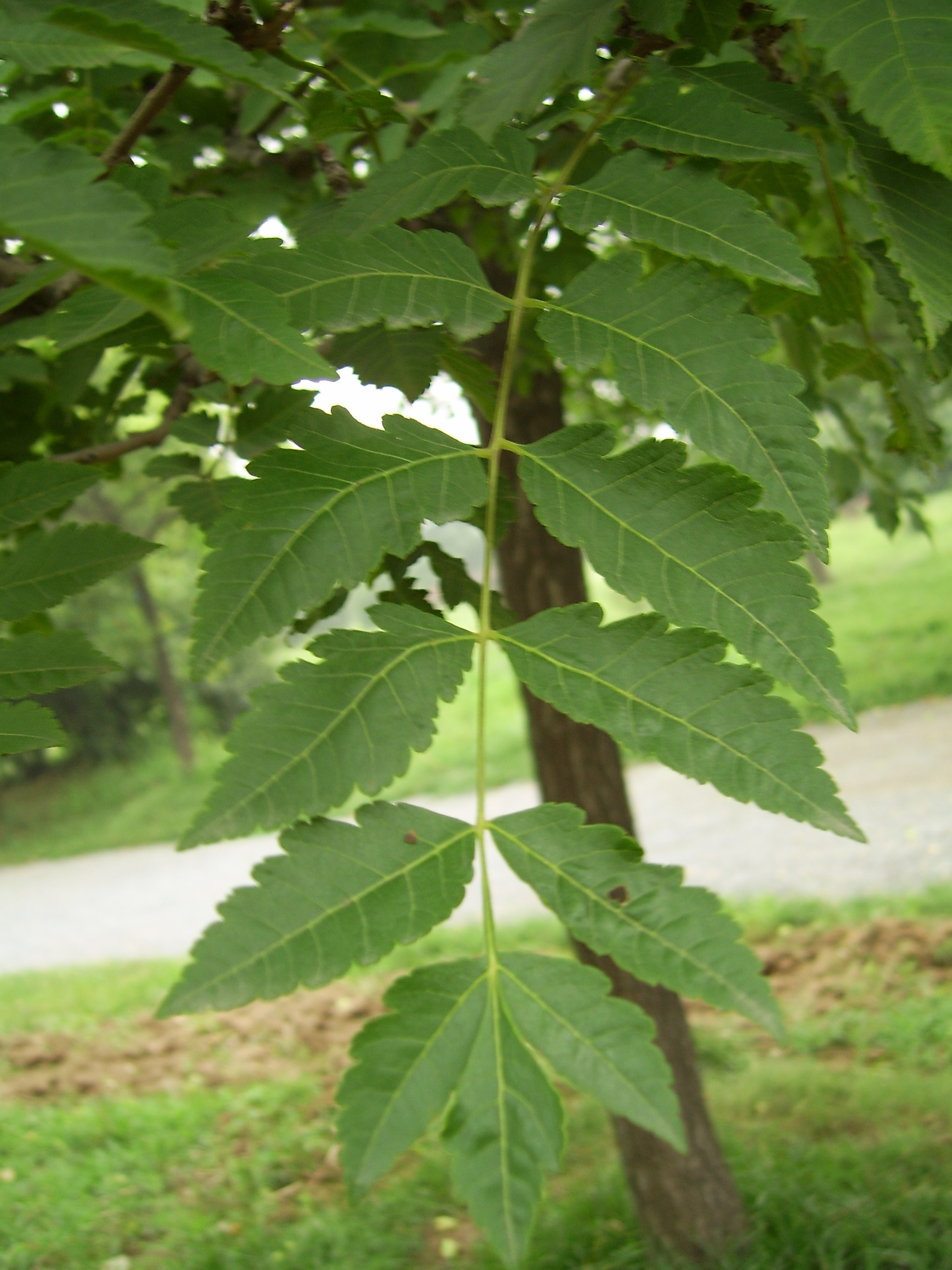
Leaf of Koelreuteria paniculata var. paniculata

Koelreuteria paniculata is a species of flowering plant in the family Sapindaceae, native to China (including Inner Mongolia), Korea, and Manchuria. Naturalized in Japan since at least the 1200s, it was introduced to Europe in 1747 and North America in 1763, and has become a popular landscape tree worldwide. Common names include goldenrain tree, pride of India, China tree, and the varnish tree.

== Description ==
Koelreuteria paniculata is a small to medium-sized deciduous tree growing to 7 m (23 ft) tall, with a broad, dome-shaped crown. The leaves are pinnate, 15–40 cm (6–16 in) long, rarely to 50 cm (20 in), with 7–15 leaflets 3–8 cm long, with a deeply serrated margin; the larger leaflets at the midpoint of the leaf are sometimes themselves pinnate but the leaves are not consistently fully bipinnate as in the related Koelreuteria bipinnata.

The flowers are yellow, with four petals, growing in large terminal panicles 20–40 cm (8–16 in) long. The fruit is a three-part inflated bladderlike pod, 3–6 cm long and 2–4 cm broad, that is green, then ripening from orange to pink in autumn. It contains several dark brown to black seeds 5–8 mm diameter.

== Taxonomy ==
=== Publication ===
The species was first published in 1772, in the 1771 edition of Novi commentarii academiae scientiarum imperialis Petropolitanae, attributed to Erik Laxmann.

=== Varieties ===
Several varieties have been described:

- K. paniculata var. paniculata. Northern China and Korea. Leaves single-pinnate.
- K. paniculata var. apiculata (Rehder & E.H.Wilson) Rehder (syn. K. apiculata). Western China (Sichuan), intergrading with var. paniculata in central China. Leaves with larger leaflets commonly bipinnate.
- K. paniculata var. fastigiata. Small growing columnar form originated in 1888.
- K. paniculata var. variegata. a form with variegated foliage.

But none of them are accepted.

== Cultivation ==
Koelreuteria paniculata has been cultivated since ancient times. In the Zhou dynasty it was one of the five official memorial trees (alongside Pinus tabuliformis, Platycladus orientalis, Styphnolobium japonicum and certain poplars), being planted next to the tombs of scholars.

It is popularly grown as an ornamental tree in temperate regions all across the world because of the aesthetic appeal of its flowers, leaves and seed pods. Several cultivars have been selected for garden planting, including 'Fastigiata' with a narrow crown, and 'September Gold', flowering in late summer.

In the UK the cultivar 'Coral Sun' has gained the Award of Garden Merit of the Royal Horticultural Society.

In some areas, notably the eastern United States (and particularly in Florida), it is considered an invasive species.

== Gallery ==
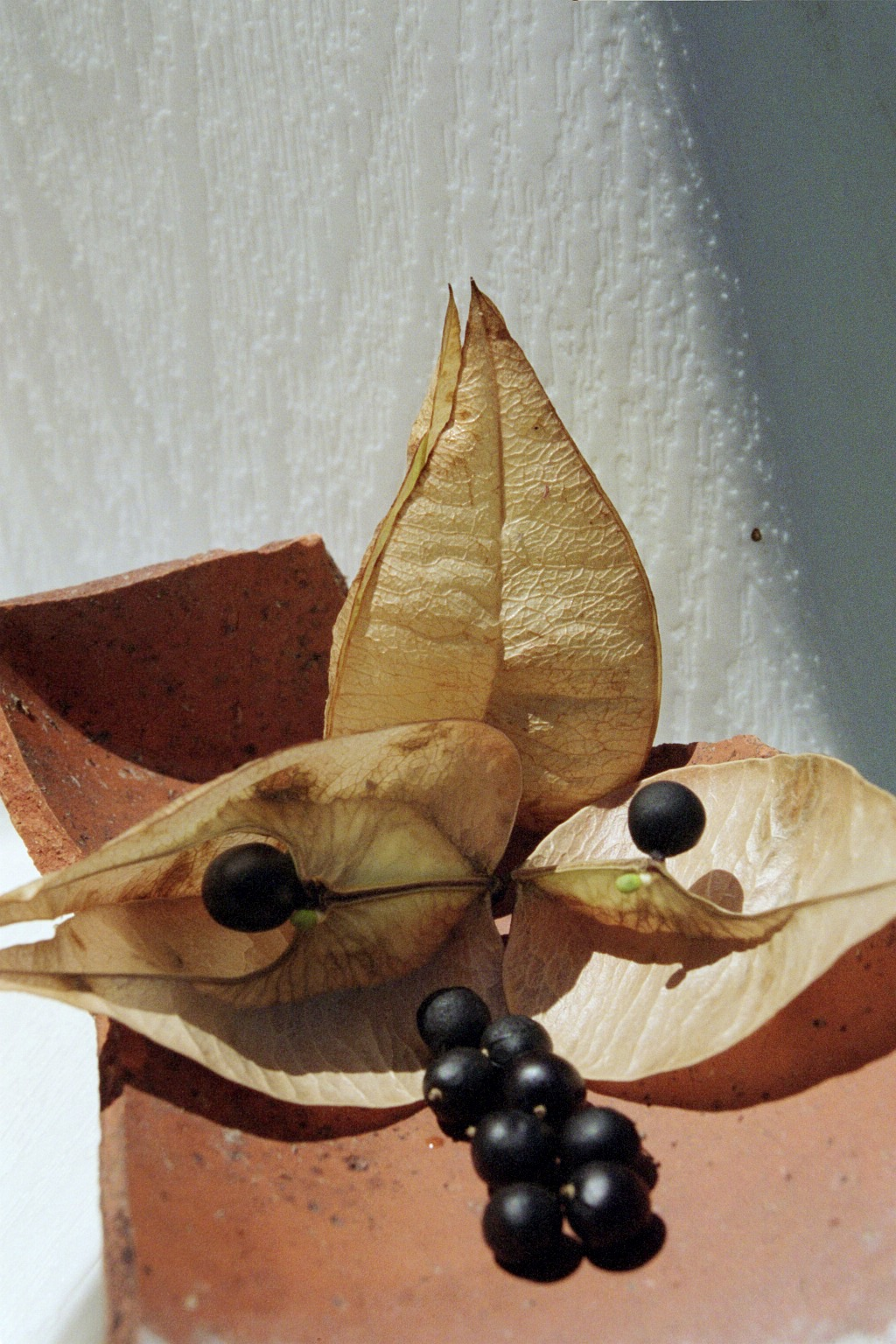
Fruits

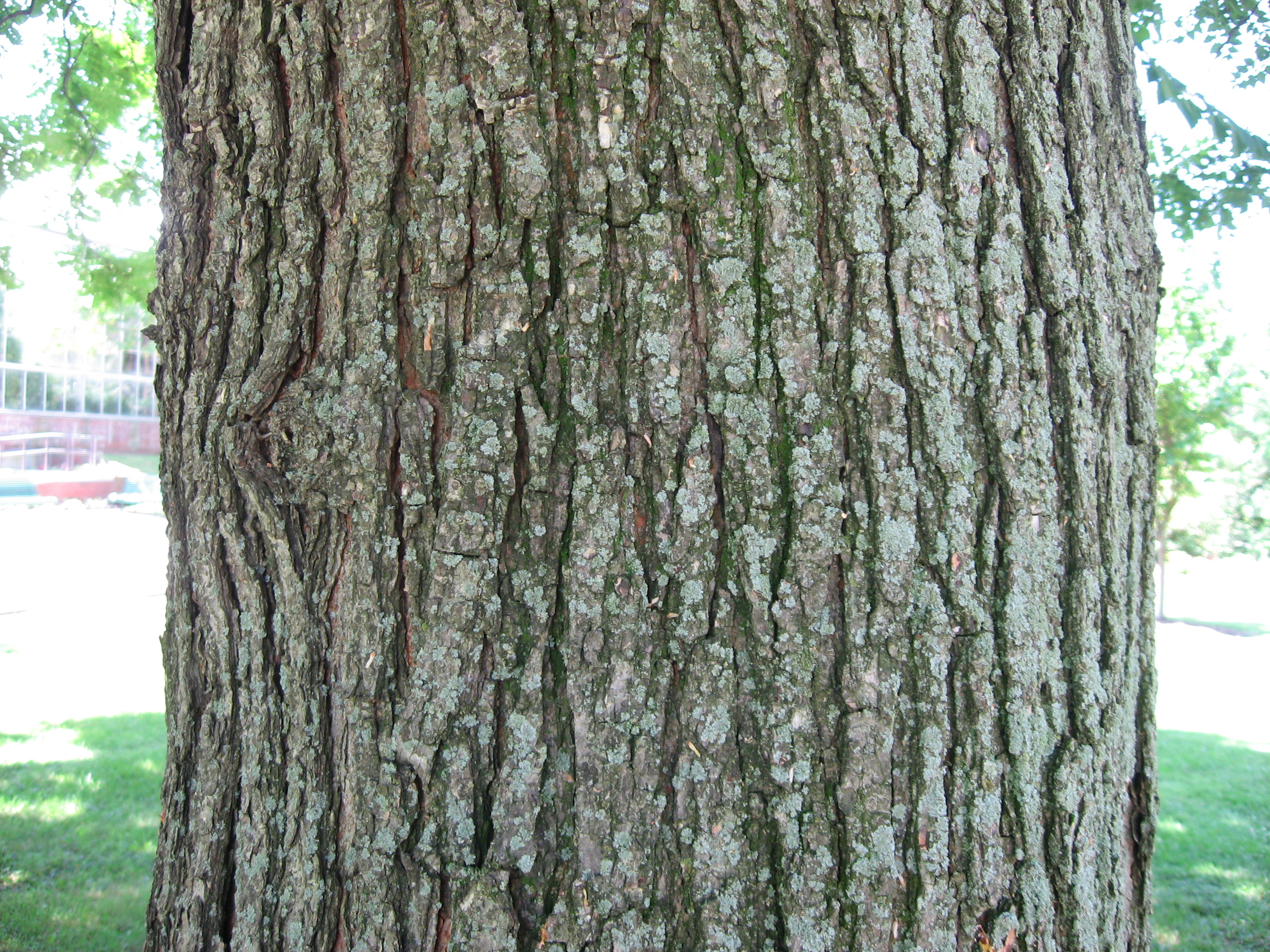
Bark

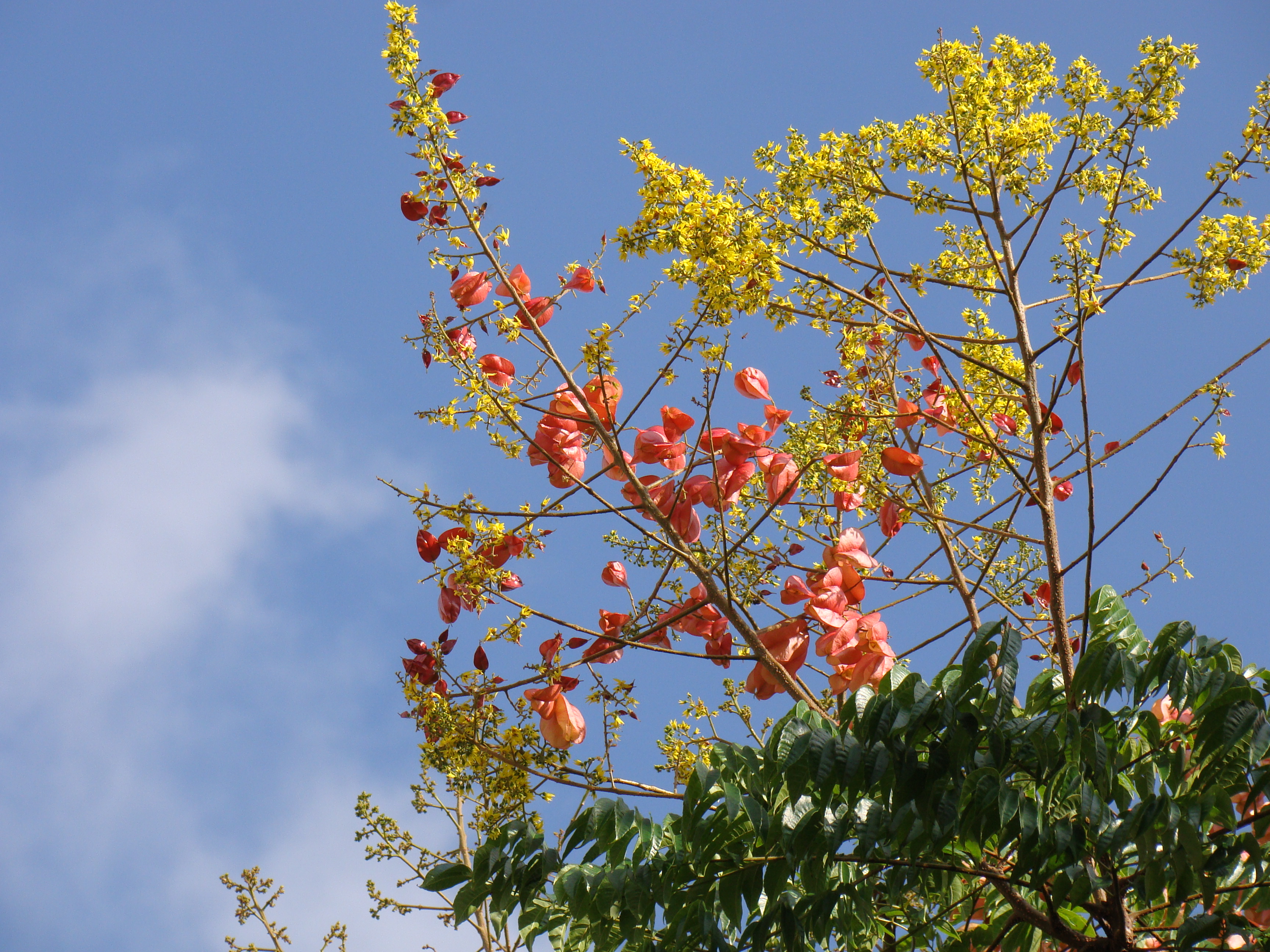
Flowers and legumens in the top of a tree in São Paulo Brazil

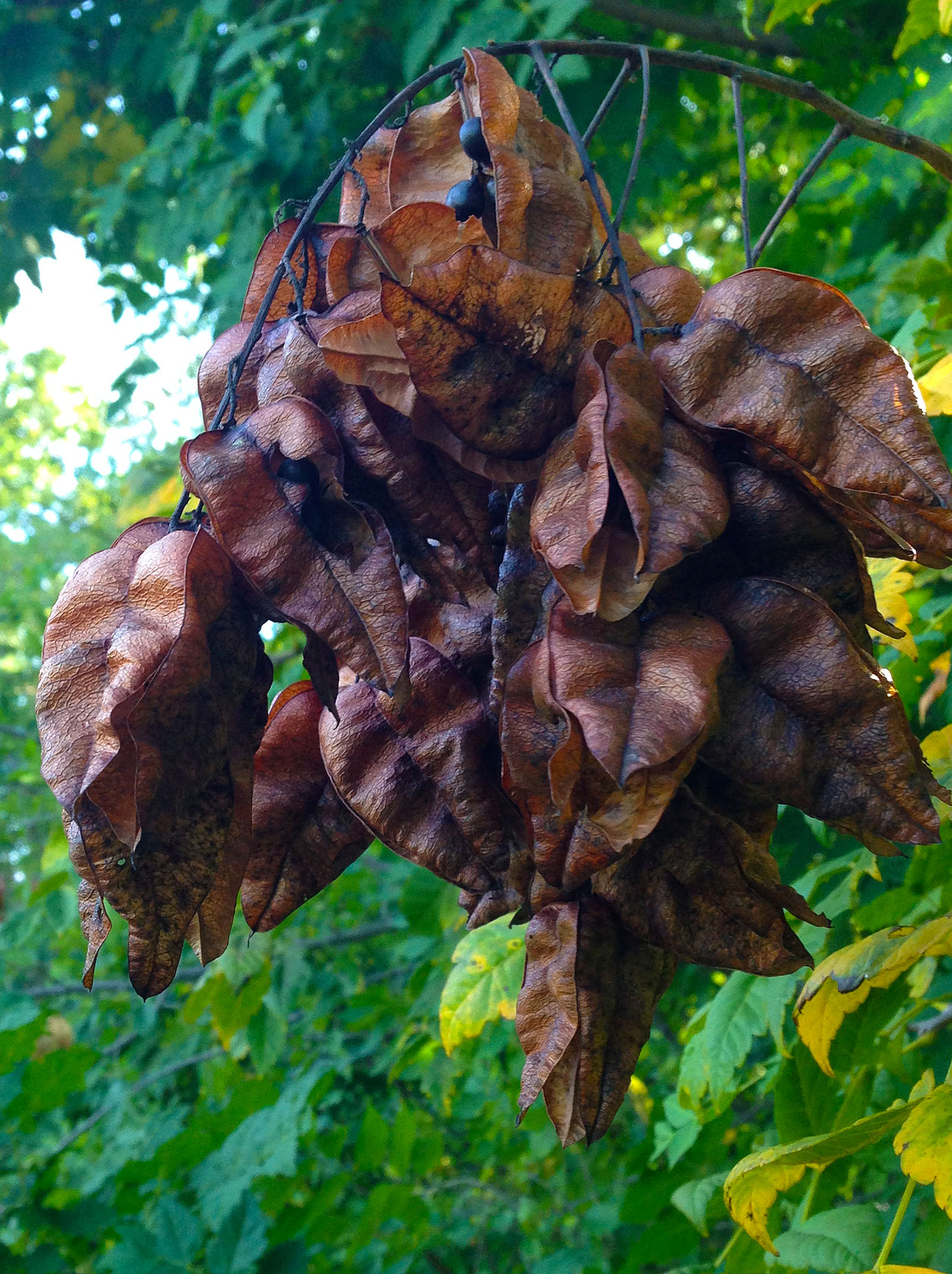
Koelreuteria paniculata infructescence, Butler County, Kansas

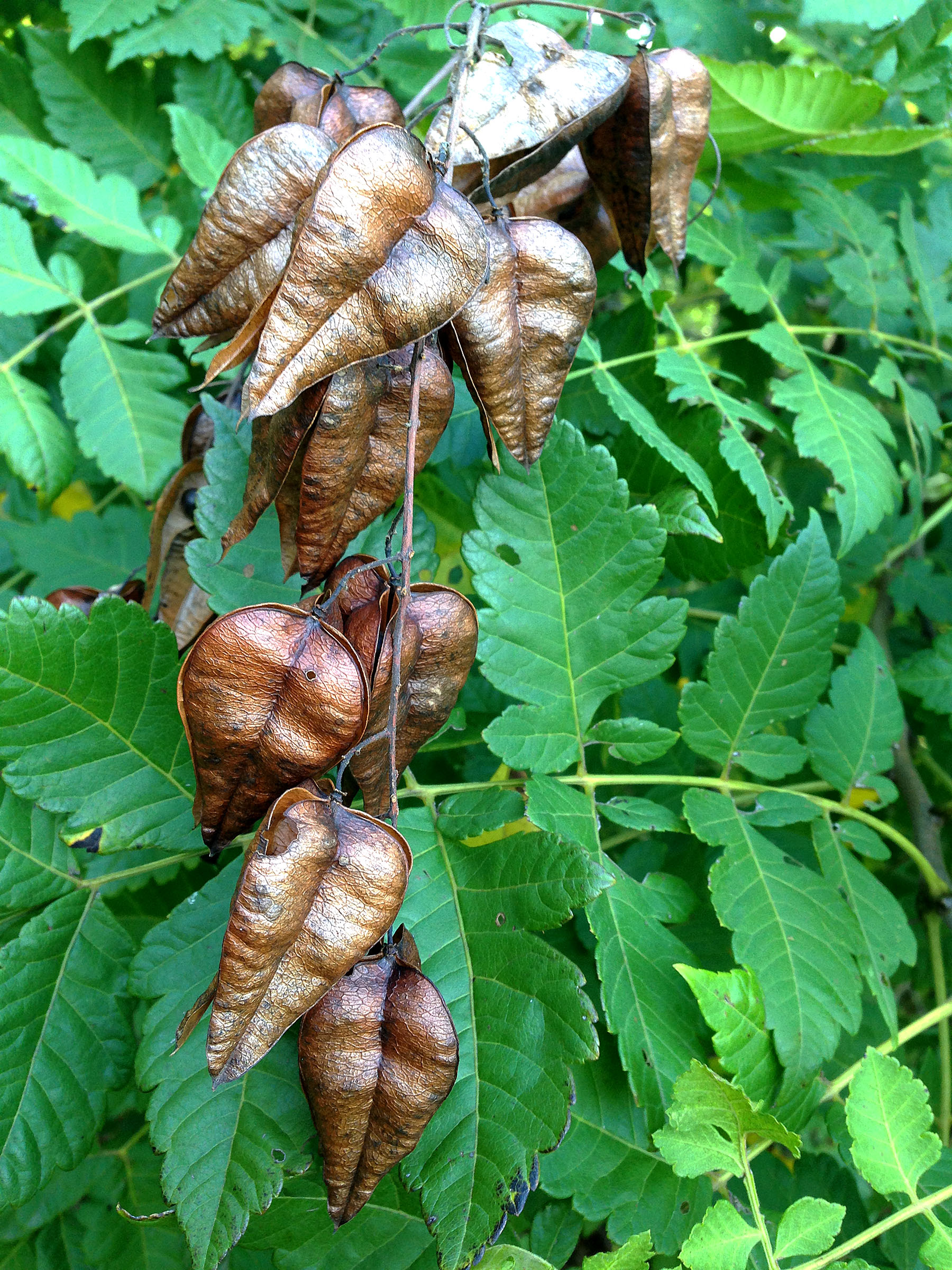
Koelreuteria paniculata infructescence and leaves, Harvey County, Kansas

A compound leaf in November
