= Andrei Bogdanov =

Andrei or Andrey Bogdanov may refer to:

- Andrei Ivanovich Bogdanov (1692–1766), Russian bibliographer and ethnographer
- Andrei Bogdanov (politician) (born 1970), leader of the Russian Communist Party of Social Justice
- Andrei Bogdanov (luger) (born 1992), Russian luger
- Andrey Bogdanov (swimmer) (1958–1999), Russian swimmer
