= Andrei Ivanovich =

Andrei Ivanovich may refer to:

- Andrei Ivanovich Kobyla, 14th century progenitor of the House of Romanov
- Andrei Ivanovich Osterman (1686–1747), German-born Russian statesman who rose under Peter the Great
- Andrei Ivanovich Bogdanov (1692–1766), Russian bibliographer
- Andrei Ivanovich Zhelyabov (1851–1881), Russian revolutionary, member of the executive committee of Narodnaya Volya
- Andrei Ivanovich Shingarev (1869–1918), Russian doctor, publicist and politician
- Andrey Ivanovich Lavrov, Russian handball goalkeeper and Olympic champion
