= Dreams of Russia =

- Movie poster
- Directed by: Jun'ya Satō
- Written by: Fumio Kōnami; Tatsuo Nogami; Jun'ya Satō
- Based on: Oroshiyakoku Suimutan by Yasushi Inoue
- Produced by: Tsutomu Sakurai; Tsutomu Tsuchikawa; Hiroshi Yamamoto
- Starring: Ken Ogata; Tōru Emori; Marina Vlady; Oleg Yankovsky; Yevgeny Yevstigneyev
- Narrated by: Igor Taradaykin; Elena Borzunova
- Cinematography: Mutsuo Naganuma
- Edited by: Akira Suzuki
- Music by: Katsu Hoshi
- Production companies: Lenfilm; Daiei Studios; Tokuma Shoten
- Distributed by: Toho
- Release date: June 25, 1992 (Japan)
- Running time: 123 minutes
- Countries: Japan; Russia
- Languages: Russian; Japanese
- Box office: ¥3.06 billion (Japan)

Dreams of Russia (Japanese: おろしや国酔夢譚, romanized: Oroshiyakoku Suimutan; Russian: Сны о России, romanized: Sni o Rossii), also known as The Dream of Russia or Kodayu, is a 1992 Japanese-Russian period film directed and co-written by Jun'ya Satō. It is based on a book of the same name by Japanese writer Yasushi Inoue. Toho theatrically released the film on June 25, 1992, in Japan.

== Plot ==
The film tells real historical events in the interstate relations of the Russian Empire during the time of Catherine II and Japan during the time of the Tokugawa shogunate that occurred in the 1780s–1790s.

In 1782, the Japanese ship Shinsho-maru, captained by Daikokuya Kōdayū, with a crew of 16 sailors, was caught in a storm. The sailors had to cut down the mast, and after a two hundred-day drift, the ship washed up on the Russian coast in the Aleutian Islands. Next, the Japanese were waiting for almost nine years, wandering around the Russian Empire in the hope of returning to their homeland.

Together with Russian fur traders, they build a ship and successfully sail from the Aleutian Islands to the mainland. Having reached Okhotsk, they are faced with a new problem: the local Russian administration provides them with assistance and provides temporary housing, but cannot independently resolve the issue of their return to Japan, since this requires the sanction of the Irkutsk governor. The Japanese are told that sending a letter to the Irkutsk authorities and receiving a response will take about a year. The frustrated Japanese decide to get to Irkutsk on their own. The journey takes several months, during which the Japanese consider the Siberian winter a real hell. Arrival in Irkutsk does not solve the problem: the post of governor is temporarily vacant, and the request of the Japanese sailors has been forwarded to Saint Petersburg. The regional authorities can only arrange Japanese teachers in Irkutsk as Japanese language teachers, but not return them to their homeland. In Irkutsk, Japanese sailors meet the Russian scientist and traveler, academician of the Saint Petersburg Academy of Sciences Erik Laxmann, who takes an active part in their return to Japan. Laxman brings Captain Daikokuya Kōdayū to Saint Petersburg in the hope of obtaining an audience with Empress Catherine II. Japanese sailors, seeing off the captain, have little faith in success (it's like trying to meet with the shogun). In Saint Petersburg, Laxman arranges an audience with the captain, Vice Chancellor A. A. Bezborodko, and consults with him and Count A. R. Vorontsov. The gardener and maid of honor of Catherine II, influential at the court, also provide assistance to the Japanese. Some time later, the Japanese captain is granted an audience with the Russian Empress. Daikokuya Kōdayū begs her to return him to his homeland. Catherine II allows this, and in 1792 an expedition is equipped to the shores of Japan. On a Russian warship, only three Japanese sailors return to their homeland (two more wished to stay in Irkutsk; the rest died). The Japanese authorities receive the Russian embassy without hostility, but without much enthusiasm: Japan has a policy of self-isolation. The Japanese give permission for one Russian ship to enter Nagasaki, where the Japanese sailors land. One of the Japanese soon dies while in Ezo (modern Hokkaido). Friends manage to tell him that he is dying on Japanese soil, to which he still managed to return. The Japanese who returned to their homeland again find themselves in the balance of death – according to the laws of that time, they had to be executed. Only by order of the shogun were they pardoned.

At the end of the film, a voice-over reports that the activities of Erik Laxmann and Daikokuya Kōdayū played a significant role in the development of relations between Russia and Japan and contributed to the establishment of diplomatic relations between these countries.

== Cast ==
- Ken Ogata as Daikokuya Kōdayū
- Tōru Emori as Matsudaira Sadanobu
- Marina Vlady as Catherine the Great
- Oleg Yankovsky as Erik Laxmann
- Yevgeny Yevstigneyev as Bush, the court gardener
- Yury Solomin as Alexander Bezborodko
- Vitaly Solomin as Grigory Shelikhov
- Vladimir Yeryomin as Alexander Vorontsov
- Boris Klyuyev as Russian naval officer
- Anastasiya Nemolyaeva as Tatiana, an Irkutsk inhabitant
- Vladimir Naumov as episode
- Viktor Stepanov as Nevidimov
- Aleksei Serebryakov as Sailor
