= Daikokuya Kōdayū =

Japanese castaway (1751–1828)

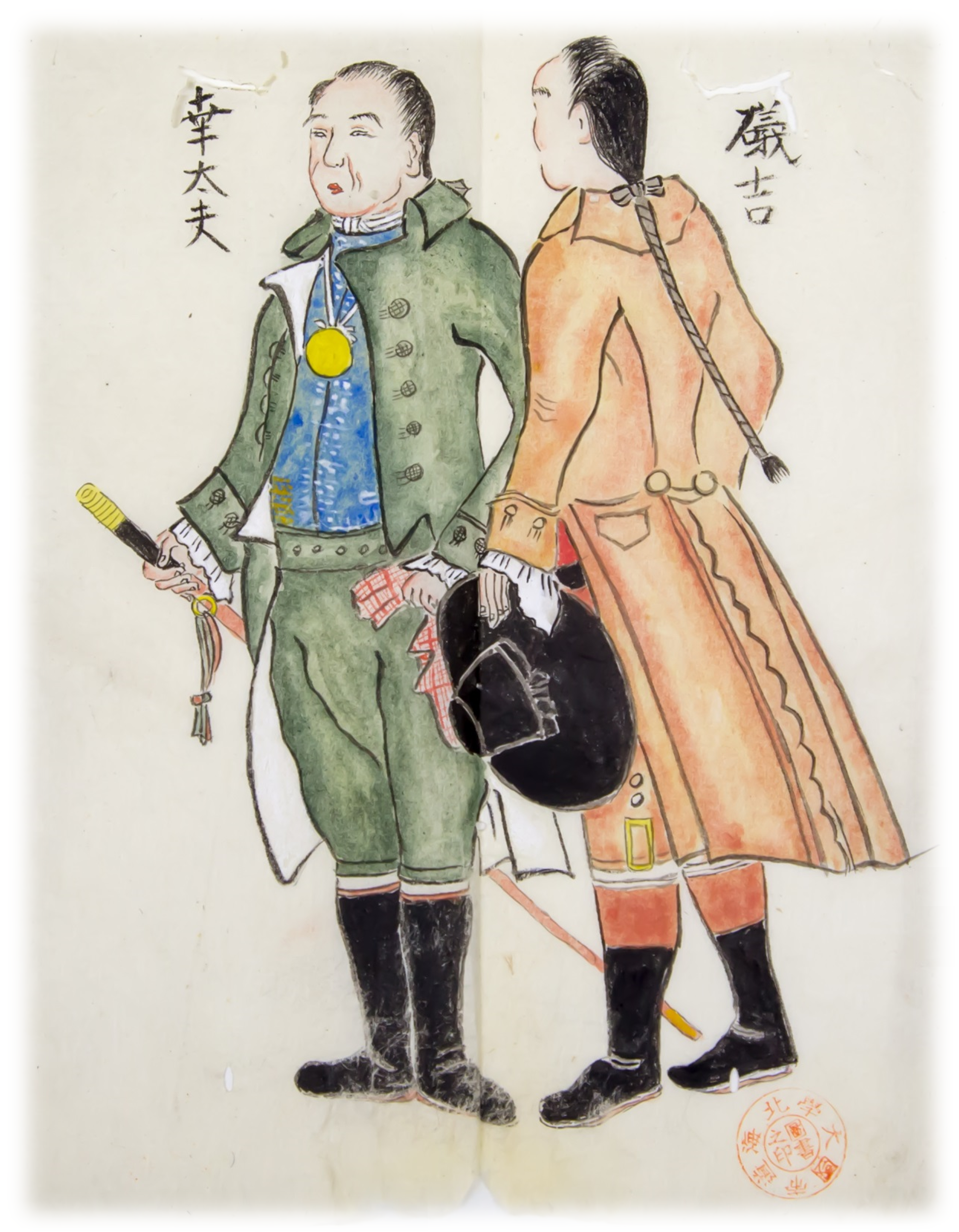
Daikokuya Kōdayū (大黒屋光太夫) and Isokichi (磯吉) when returned to Japan by Adam Laxman, 1792.

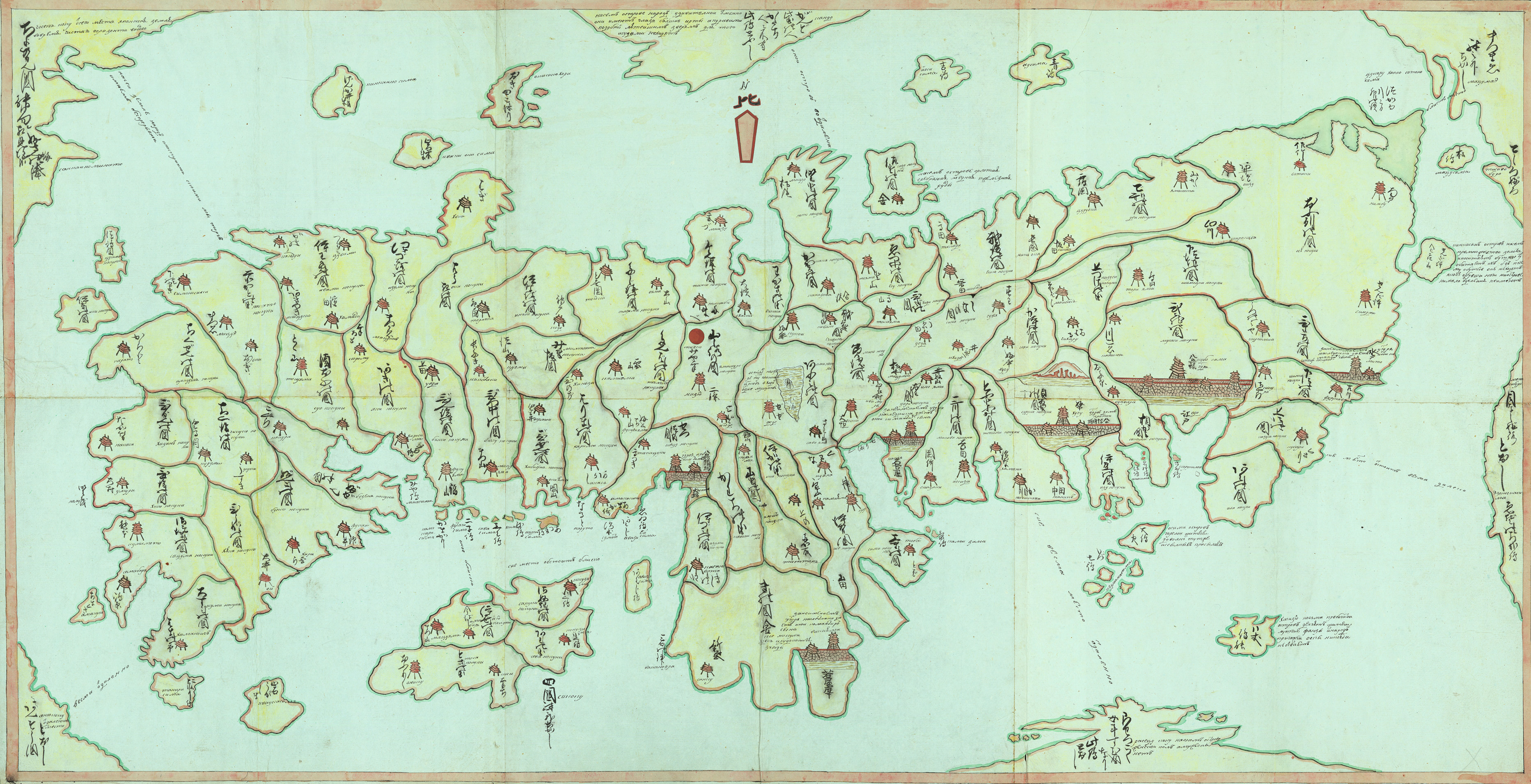
Map of Japan supposedly drawn by Daikokuya Kōdayū in 1789 with place names in both Japanese and Russian.

Daikokuya Kōdayū (大黒屋 光太夫) (1751 – 28 May 1828) was a Japanese castaway who spent nine years in Russia. His ship landed at Amchitka, in the Aleutian Islands. The crew managed to travel to the Russian mainland and Catherine the Great allowed them to go back to Japan. This was made possible through the efforts of Erik Laxmann, Alexander Bezborodko, and Alexander Vorontsov. Two of the crew made it back to Japan alive, though one died while they were detained in Yezo (Hokkaidō). Of the rest of the crew, two converted to Christianity and stayed in Irkutsk, and 11 others died.

== Early life ==
Daikokuya Kōdayū was born in Wakamatsu, Ise Province (now Suzuka, Mie, Japan). He was adopted by a merchant, Daikokuya of Shiroko, Ise (also now part of Suzuka, Mie).

== Adrift ==
As the captain of the ship Shinsho-maru (神昌丸), Kōdayū set sail for Yedo in 1782. The ship was caught in a storm around Enshū (western Shizuoka) and was blown off course. After drifting for seven months, one man died. Just after the man died, they found and landed on the island Amchitka where Russians and Aleut people lived. The crew witnessed the Aleuts' uprising in 1784.

After the Russian ship which came to pick them up sank just in front of Kodayu's people and Russians, the 25 Russians and 9 Kōdayū's people escaped from the island by building a new ship of driftwood with sails made of otter skins. They sailed for one and a half months. Russian officials in Kamchatka at first could not believe they had sailed from Amchitka to Kamchatka in a "hand-made boat". At Kamchatka, Kōdayū met Barthélemy de Lesseps, a French diplomat. Lesseps wrote about the Japanese castaways and the leader Kōdayū in his book, Journal historique du voyage de M. de Lesseps published in 1790. According to Lesseps, "The crew had special feeling of attachment and respect with Kōdayū. He also showed his attachment as much as they did to him, and he always paid attention if they had any frustrating matters as possible as he could." Kōdayū did not hide what he thought and his Russian had a strong accent and he spoke very fast so sometimes Lesseps could not understand. He wore Japanese clothes, which did not cover his throat, even when it was freezing cold, despite Russian people's recommendation that he should have covered his throat.

A captain in Kamchatka, possibly by the name Khotkevich, led Kōdayū's people to Okhotsk. Kodayu's people temporarily stayed in Yakutsk. In Irkutsk, Captain Khotkevich introduced Kōdayū's people to Erik (Kirill) Laxmann. Kōdayū's people had assistance by others, including Erik Laxman, in Irkutsk. Kōdayū then left for Saint Petersburg in order to accompany Kirill to ask to be returned home in 1791. By the instrumental help of Kirill, Kodayu was granted an audience with Catherine the Great in Tsarskoye Selo and Kodayu's people were permitted to return home in the same year.

== In fiction ==
The story is told in the film Dreams of Russia (1992), directed by Junya Sato. It was based on a book of the same name written by Yasushi Inoue, published in 1968.

== See also ==
- Kirill Laxman
- Amchitka
- Catherine the Great
- Alexander Bezborodko
- Alexander Vorontsov
- Alexander I of Russia
- Paul I of Russia
- Alexander Radishchev
- Grigory Shelikhov
- Barthélemy de Lesseps(uncle of Ferdinand) in Kamchatska
- Dembei
