= Nemuro City Museum of History and Nature =

Japanese museum

- 根室市歴史と自然の資料館
- Location within Hokkaido Location within Japan

General information
- Location: 209 Hanasakiminato, Nemuro, Hokkaidō, Japan
- Coordinates: 43°17′19″N 145°35′25″E
- Opened: 1990 (Nemuro City Local Material Preservation Center); October 2004 (Nemuro City Museum of History and Nature)

Website
- Official website

Nemuro City Museum of History and Nature (根室市歴史と自然の資料館, Nemuro-shi Rekishi to Shizen no Shiryōkan) is a museum-equivalent facility in Nemuro, Hokkaidō, Japan. It was established by the City of Nemuro in 2004 and is classed as a general museum, collecting and exhibiting materials relating both to the humanities and the natural sciences.

== History ==
The red-brick building in which the museum is housed dates to 1942, when it was built for a communications detail from the Imperial Japanese Navy Ōminato Guard District. Repurposed after the war as the schoolhouse for Hanasakiminato Junior School, after the school relocated to new premises, from 1990 it served, as the Nemuro City Local Material Preservation Center (根室市郷土資料保存センター), for storage, research into, and the display of materials relating to the area's natural and cultural history. Since October 2004, with its name changed to Nemuro City Museum of History and Nature, it has operated as a museum-equivalent facility, designated in accordance with the Museum Act.

== Collection ==
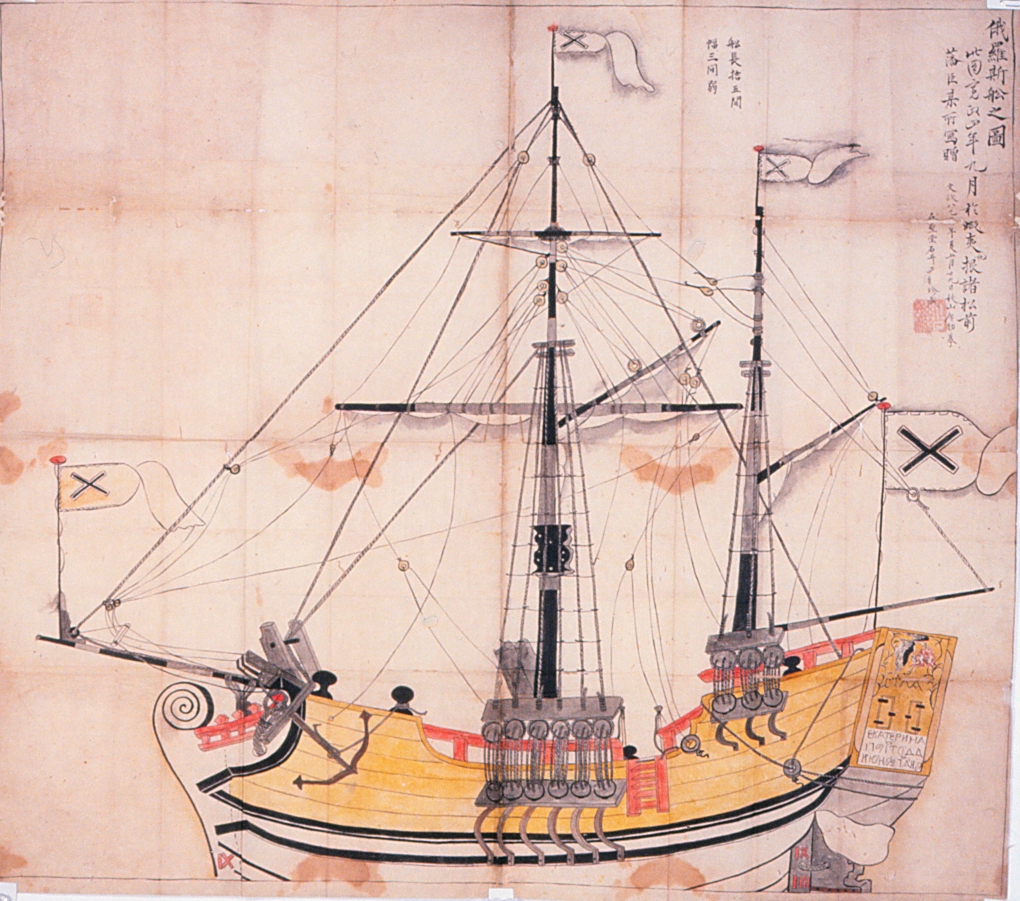
Ekaterina (c. 1792), the vessel, captained by V. F. Lovtsov, on which Adam Laxman sailed to Japan

The collection of some forty thousand items includes a painting of the ship Ekaterina (俄羅斯舩之図), dating from the time Adam Laxman arrived aboard the vessel on his 1792 Japanese expedition, and designated a Municipal Tangible Cultural Property; one of the four main boundary markers placed in 1906 along the 50th parallel at the time of the demarcation of the Sakhalin frontier following the Treaty of Portsmouth that brought the Russo-Japanese War to its close (the only time Japan has used boundary stones to define its territory; cf. Painting 75 at the Meiji Memorial Picture Gallery) (国境標石); items relating to the sea otters of the Kuriles; cannery labels (cf. the Nemuro Straits Coastal Cannery Labels that are part of Japan Heritage "Story" #084); a dogū and other grave goods excavated from the Hatsutaushi 20 Site (初田牛２０遺跡) (a Prefectural Tangible Cultural Property); and ceramics, including Urahoro-style Jōmon pottery of c. 7,500 BC, a Jōmon pot of c. 4,000 BC adorned with a bear that is the oldest animal design found to date in eastern Hokkaidō (a Municipal Tangible Cultural Property), and ceramics of the later Okhotsk and Satsumon cultures.

== See also ==
- Nemuro Peninsula Chashi Sites
- List of Historic Sites of Japan (Hokkaidō)
- List of Natural Monuments of Japan (Hokkaidō)
- List of Cultural Properties of Japan - archaeological materials (Hokkaidō)
- Akan Mashū National Park
