= Gonza =

Gonza (Japanese: 権蔵; Russian: Гонза) (1718?–1739), sometimes also Gonzo, was a Japanese castaway who drifted ashore together with Sōza (Japanese: 宗蔵; Russian: Соза), sometimes also Sozo, in the environs of Kamchatka in 1729, after the wreck of their ship, the Wakashio Maru (若潮丸) from Satsuma. The fifteen survivors from the two ships that went down were set upon by a contingent of Cossacks under Andrei Shtinnikov: thirteen were killed, Gonza and Sōza enslaved. Shtinnikov was later jailed and then executed for his pains.

In 1733 or 1734 the pair were taken to Saint Petersburg, where they were presented to Empress Anna and baptised into the Orthodox Church, Gonza taking the name of Damian Pomortsev (Дамиан Поморцев), or "from the seashore", Soza that of Kozma Shultz (Козьма Шульц). Under the supervision of assistant librarian Andrei Ivanovich Bogdanov, who taught them Russian, from 1736 the pair were set to work teaching at the new school of Japanese at the Academy of Sciences, Dembei's school having closed some time before. Kozma died aged forty-three later the same year. Damian died aged twenty-one three years later, leaving behind a grammar, an anthology, and a reader, all printed in Russian. The school itself was restocked with shipwrecked Japanese in the 1740s, relocated to Irkutsk in 1753, and continued to function until 1816.

== See also ==
- Saints Cosmas and Damian
- Sanemon
