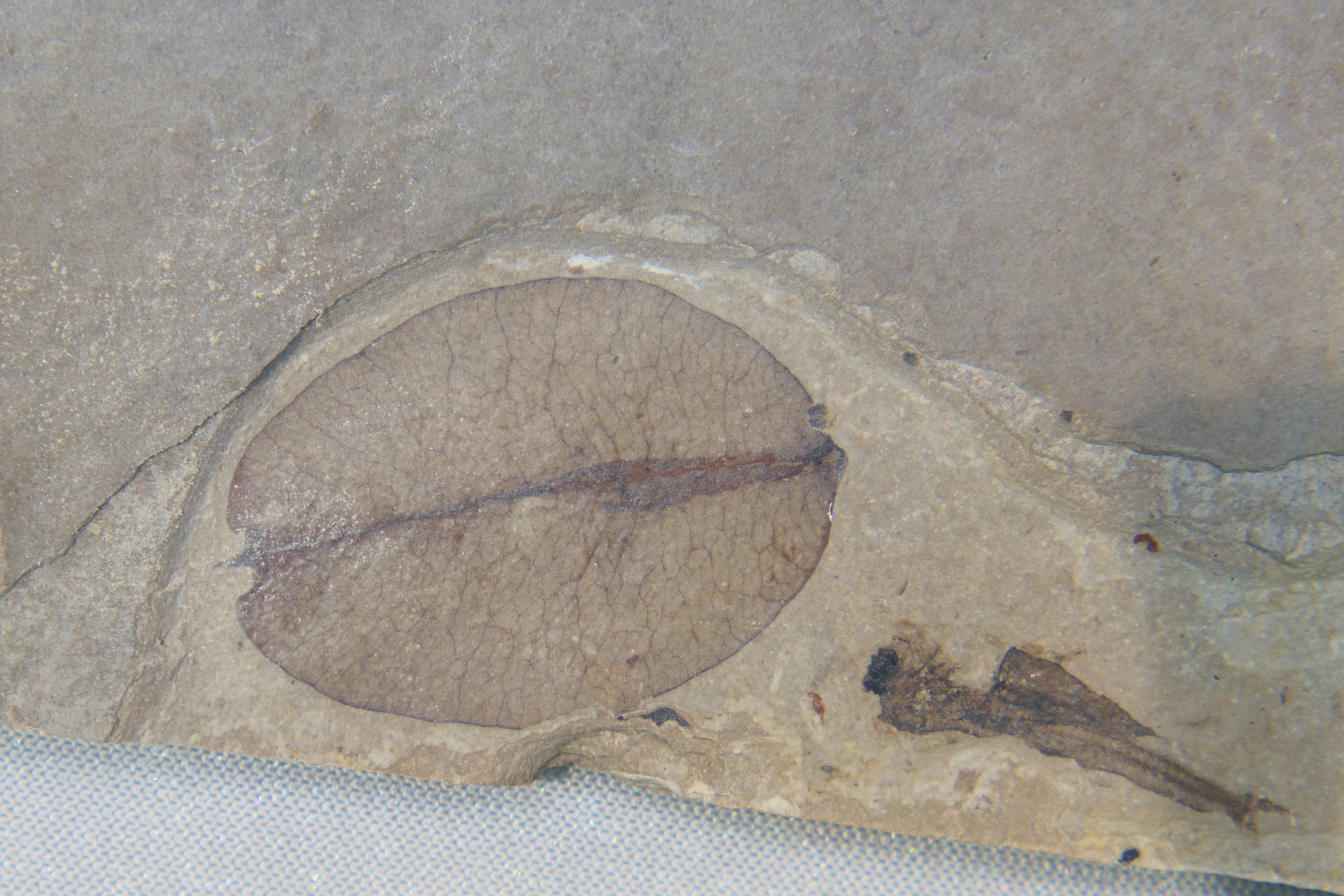

Scientific classification
- Kingdom: Plantae
- Clade: Embryophytes
- Clade: Tracheophytes
- Clade: Angiosperms
- Clade: Eudicots
- Clade: Rosids
- Order: Sapindales
- Family: Sapindaceae
- Genus: Koelreuteria
- Species: †K. lunpolaensis

Binomial name
- †Koelreuteria lunpolaensis Jiang et al.

= Koelreuteria lunpolaensis =

Koelreuteria lunpolaensis Temporal range: Oligocene

Fossil species of flowering plant

Koelreuteria lunpolaensis is an extinct species of Koelreuteria from the Tibetan Plateau of Western China.
