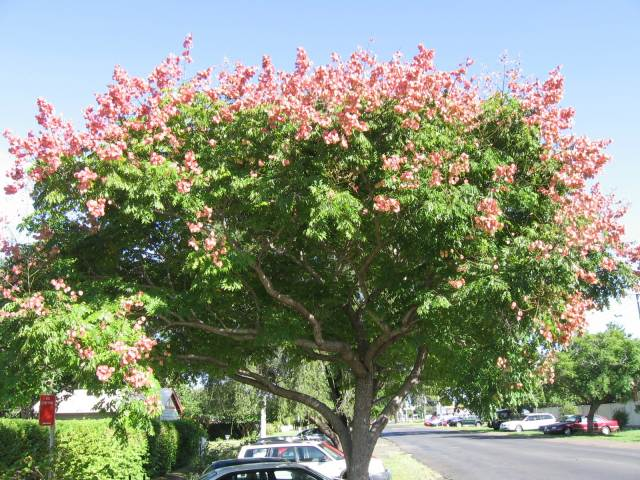
- Taiwanese rain tree with fruit

Scientific classification
- Kingdom: Plantae
- Clade: Tracheophytes
- Clade: Angiosperms
- Clade: Eudicots
- Clade: Rosids
- Order: Sapindales
- Family: Sapindaceae
- Genus: Koelreuteria
- Species: K. elegans

Binomial name
- Koelreuteria elegans (Seem.) A.C.Sm.

Subspecies
- Koelreuteria elegans ssp. elegans Koelreuteria elegans ssp. formosana (Hayata) F.G.Mey.

Synonyms
- Melia elegans Seem. Koelreuteria vitiensis A.C.Sm. Koelreuteria henryi Dummer; Koelreuteria formosana Hayata

= Koelreuteria elegans =

Species of tree

Koelreuteria elegans, more commonly known as flamegold rain tree, is a deciduous tree 15–17 metres tall. There are currently two subspecies under this taxa, i.e., K. elegans ssp. elegans, which is endemic to Fiji, and K. elegans ssp. formosana, which is endemic to Taiwan. The subspecies formosana, commonly known as Taiwanese golden rain tree, is widely grown throughout the tropics and sub-tropical parts of the world as a street tree.

K. elegans blossoms in autumn. Flowers are small, to 5 mm in diameter, and occur in terminal panicles. The flowers have four to five unequal petals, butter-yellow with red base. They contain eight stamens with hairy filaments, and the ovary is three-celled, red while flowering.

The fruit is a bladder-like, inflated capsule, red to green when unripe, and turns brown when fully mature. The capsule will eventually split into three valves, each valve is suborbicular, and has one or two (rarely three to four) black seeds.

Taiwanese golden rain tree is a declared weed in many parts of the world, particularly Brisbane, Australia and in Hawaii.

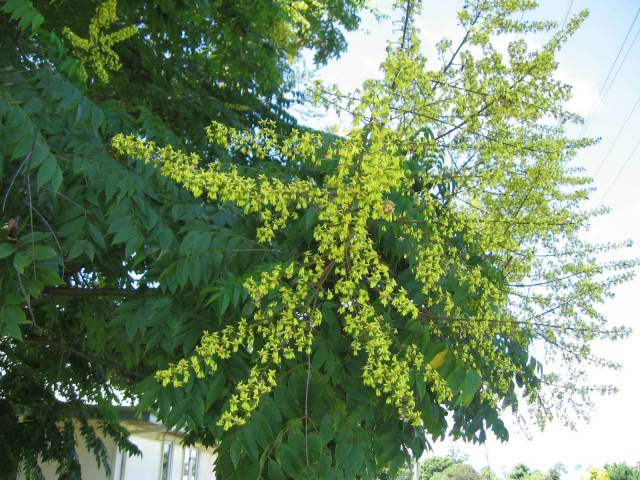
Inflorescence

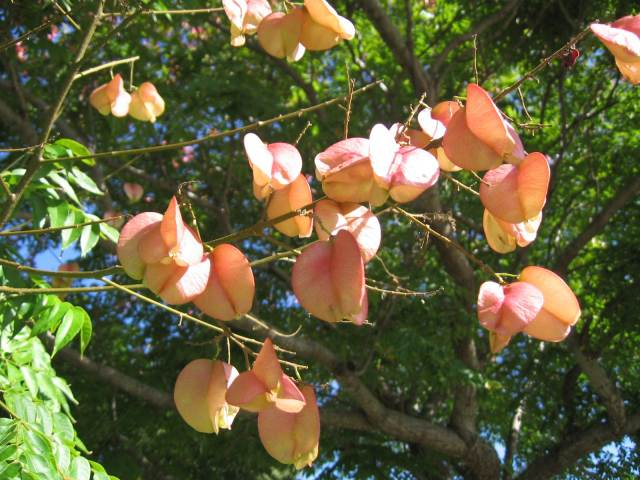
Fruit
