= Vasilii Fedorovich Lovtsov =

Russian navigator and cartographer

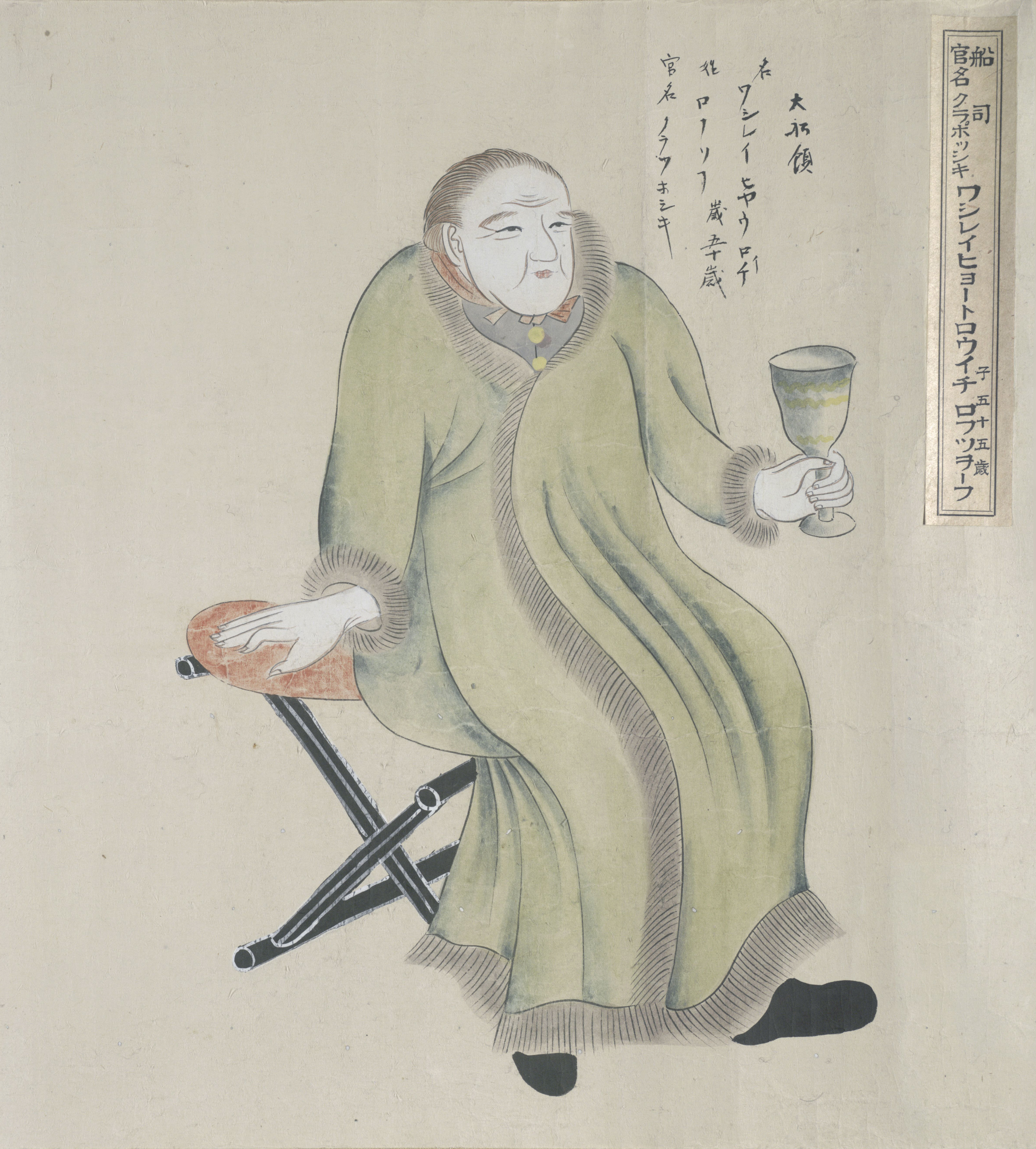
Captain Lovtsov of the Ekaterina, from a 1793 painted scroll of Adam Laksman's voyage (Hakodate City Central Library)

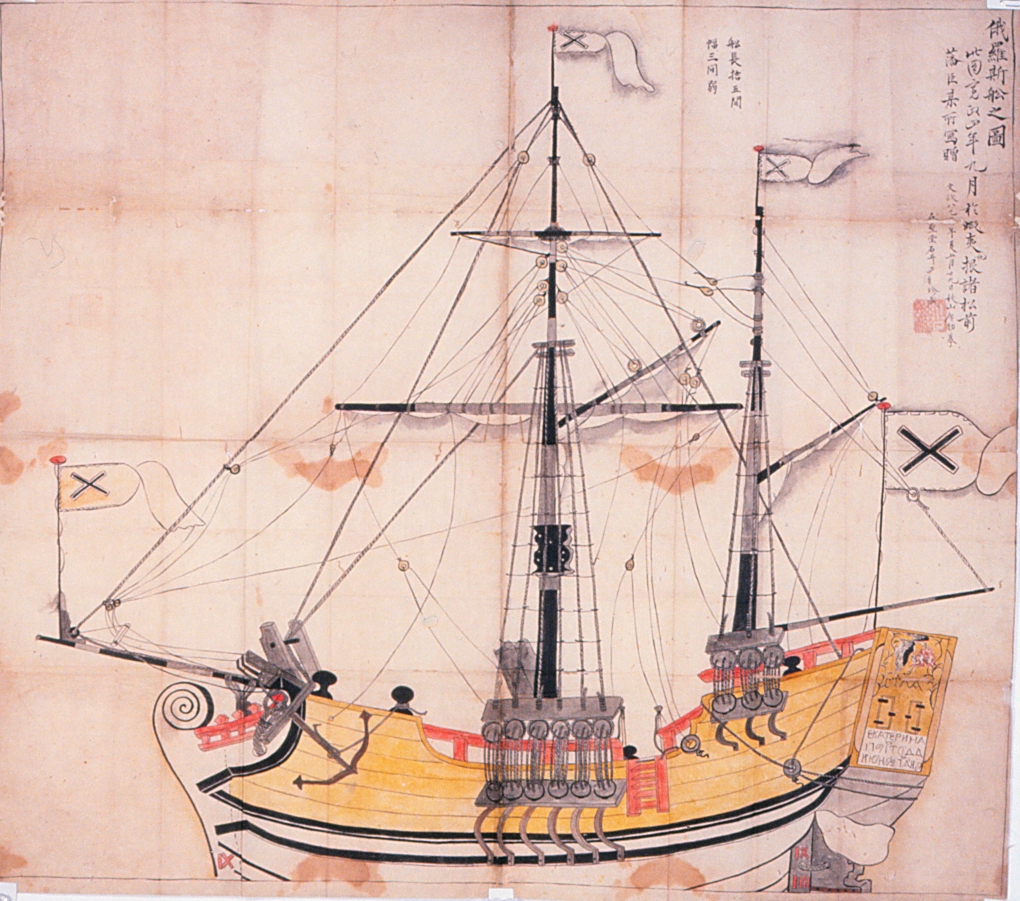
Captain Lovstov's vessel Ekaterina (c.1792) (Nemuro City Museum of History and Nature)

Vasilii Fedorovich Lovtsov (Russian: Василий Фёдорович Ловцов), sometimes Grigorii Lovtsov, was a late-eighteenth century Russian navigator and cartographer.

== Biography ==
Still a junior navigator at the time of the expedition of Pyotr Krenitsyn and Mikhail Levashov, in 1767 he was sent from Bolsheretsk on the Kamchatka Peninsula to Tobolsk with papers from Krenitsyn to the governor; detained en route at Okhotsk, the documents he was carrying were opened. In 1782, back at Bolsheretsk, he compiled an atlas of the north Pacific "from Discoveries Made by Russian Mariners and Captain James Cook and His Officers". Later, during Adam Laksman's voyage to Japan in 1792–3, Lovtsov captained the Ekaterina on which they sailed.

== See also ==
- Sakoku
- Empire of Japan–Russian Empire relations
- List of Westerners who visited Japan before 1868
