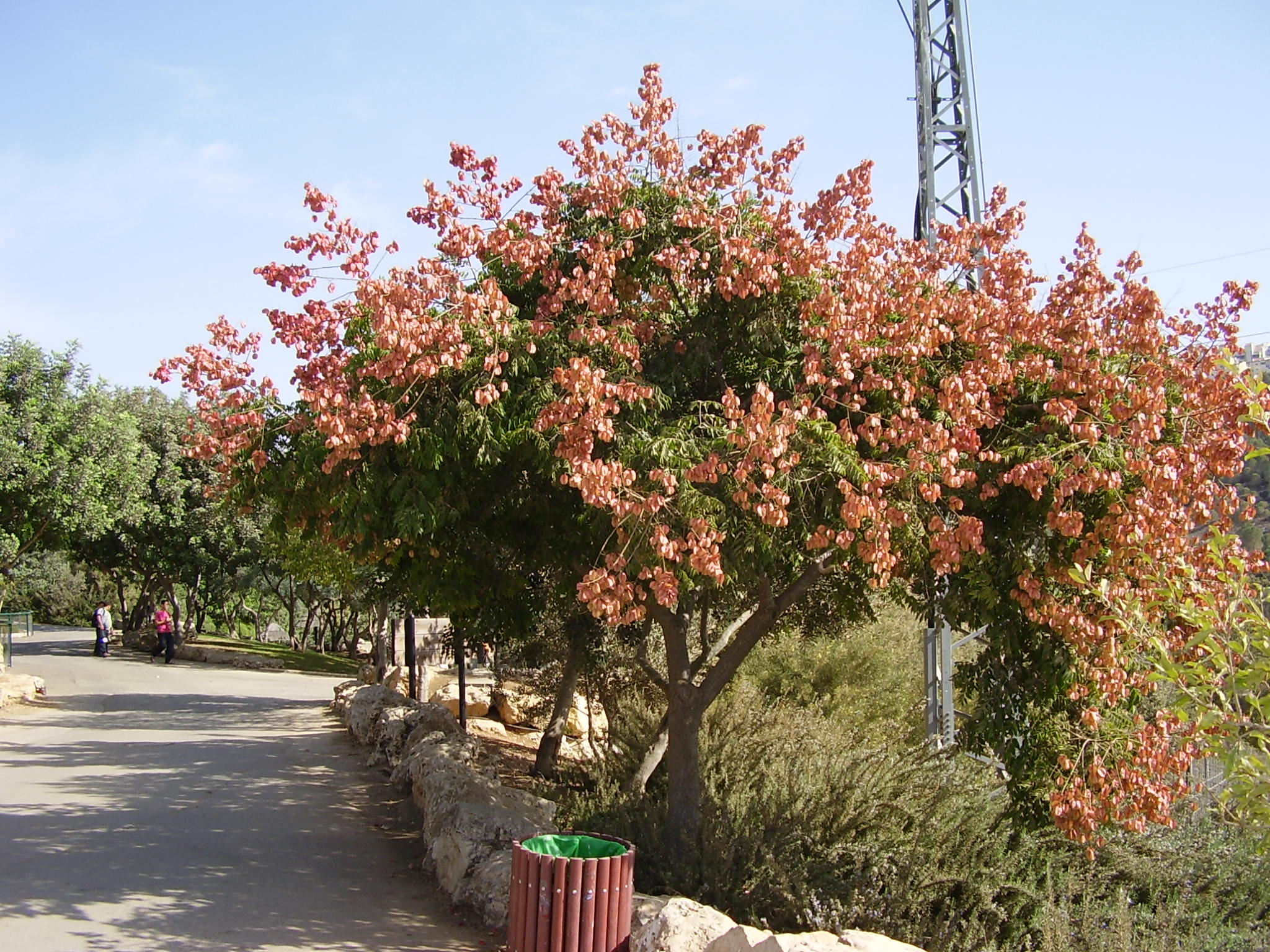

Scientific classification
- Kingdom: Plantae
- Clade: Embryophytes
- Clade: Tracheophytes
- Clade: Angiosperms
- Clade: Eudicots
- Clade: Rosids
- Order: Sapindales
- Family: Sapindaceae
- Genus: Koelreuteria
- Species: K. bipinnata

Binomial name
- Koelreuteria bipinnata Franch.

= Koelreuteria bipinnata =

Species of tree

Koelreuteria bipinnata, also known as Chinese flame tree, Chinese golden rain tree, Bougainvillea golden-rain tree, is a species of Koelreuteria native to southern China. It is a small to medium-sized deciduous tree growing between 7–20 metres tall. It is few branched and is one of the few trees that bloom in summer. The tree can live 50 to 150 years.

== Description ==
The leaves are alternate, bipinnately compound leaves; with an ovate shape and a pinnate venation, they have a green color which turns yellow in fall, leavelets measuring between 5–10 cm long.

The flowers are small and yellow with a touch of red at the base, with four petals, produced in large branched panicles that are 20–50 cm long. They are showy and have a pleasant fragrance. They flower in the summer from July to August, more northerly, in middle Europe, in September. Flowers are hermaphroditic, having both male and female organs.

The fruit is a three-lobed inflated papery capsule that is 3–6 cm long, of a faint reddish colour, showy, containing several hard, nut-like seeds which are 5–10 mm in diameter with a pink color.

The bark is thin and brown. Branches are upright growing, bend down somewhat as the tree grows, they might break due to poor collar formation, pruning is required to build a strong branching structure and a single stem, if wished, and also for the pedestrians and vehicles clearance if necessary. The tree is characterized as a weak wooded tree.

== Distribution ==
The tree is native to Southern China; its discovery is credited to Delavay who collected it in Yunnan in 1886.

== How to grow them ==
They tolerate nutritionally poor soil including: clay, sand, well drained alkaline loam; they require full sun but not a lot of watering. They tolerate wind, air pollution, aerosol salt (spray), heat, and drought. They grow moderately and are sometimes fast growers.

== Pests and diseases ==
Koelreuteria bipinnata has few to no pests or disease threatening it. The bark of the tree can develop a canker disease under certain cultural conditions.

== Uses ==
Koelreuteria bipinnata is commonly used as a focal point in landscape design in regions where they thrive; it is often used as a tree at street, highways, parking lots, for shade, garden or specimen tree. The seeds are used as beads in necklaces and the flowers can yield a yellow dye.

== Gallery ==
Bougainvillea golden-rain-tree (Koelreuteria bipinnata)

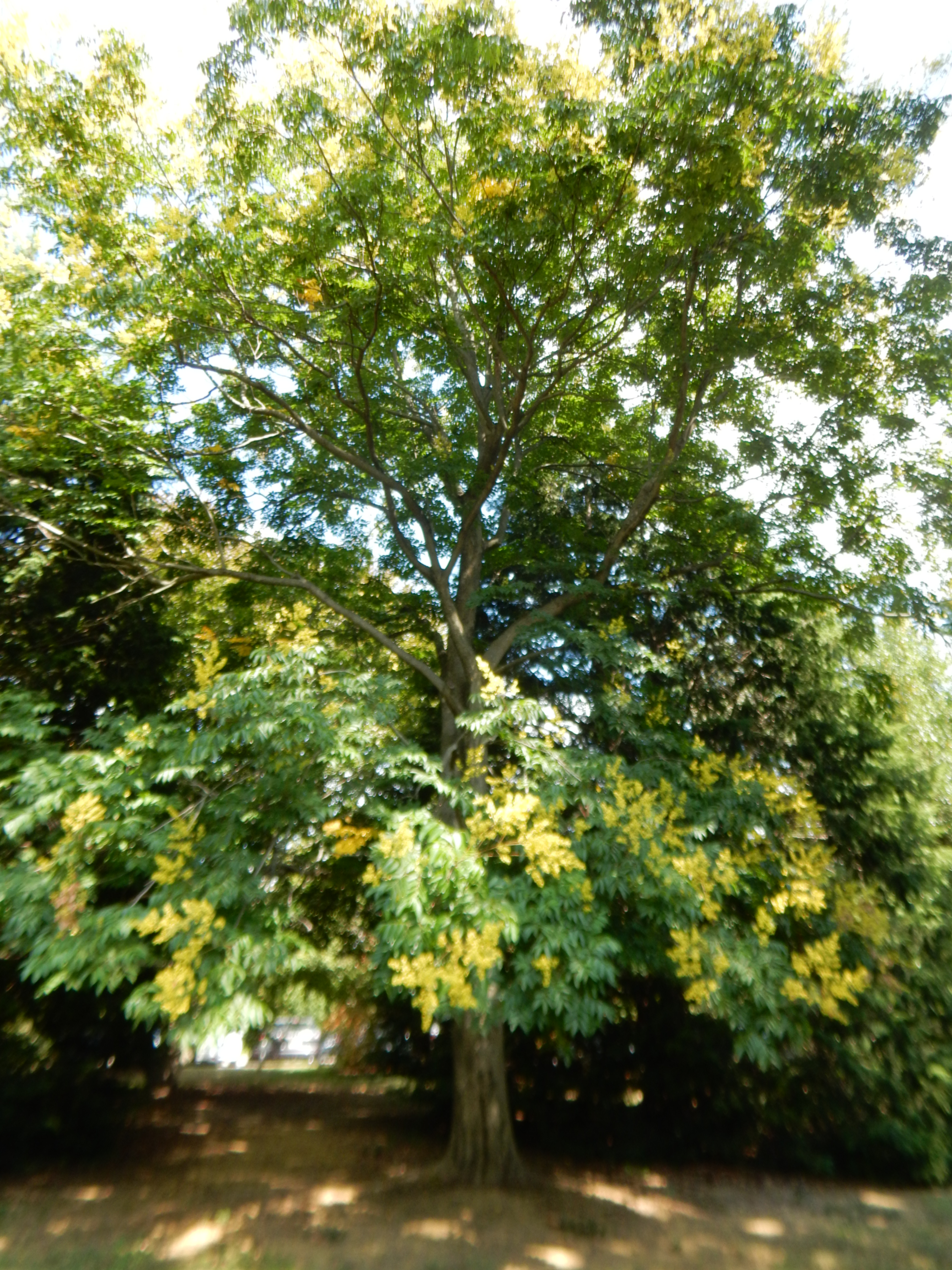
Blooming tree

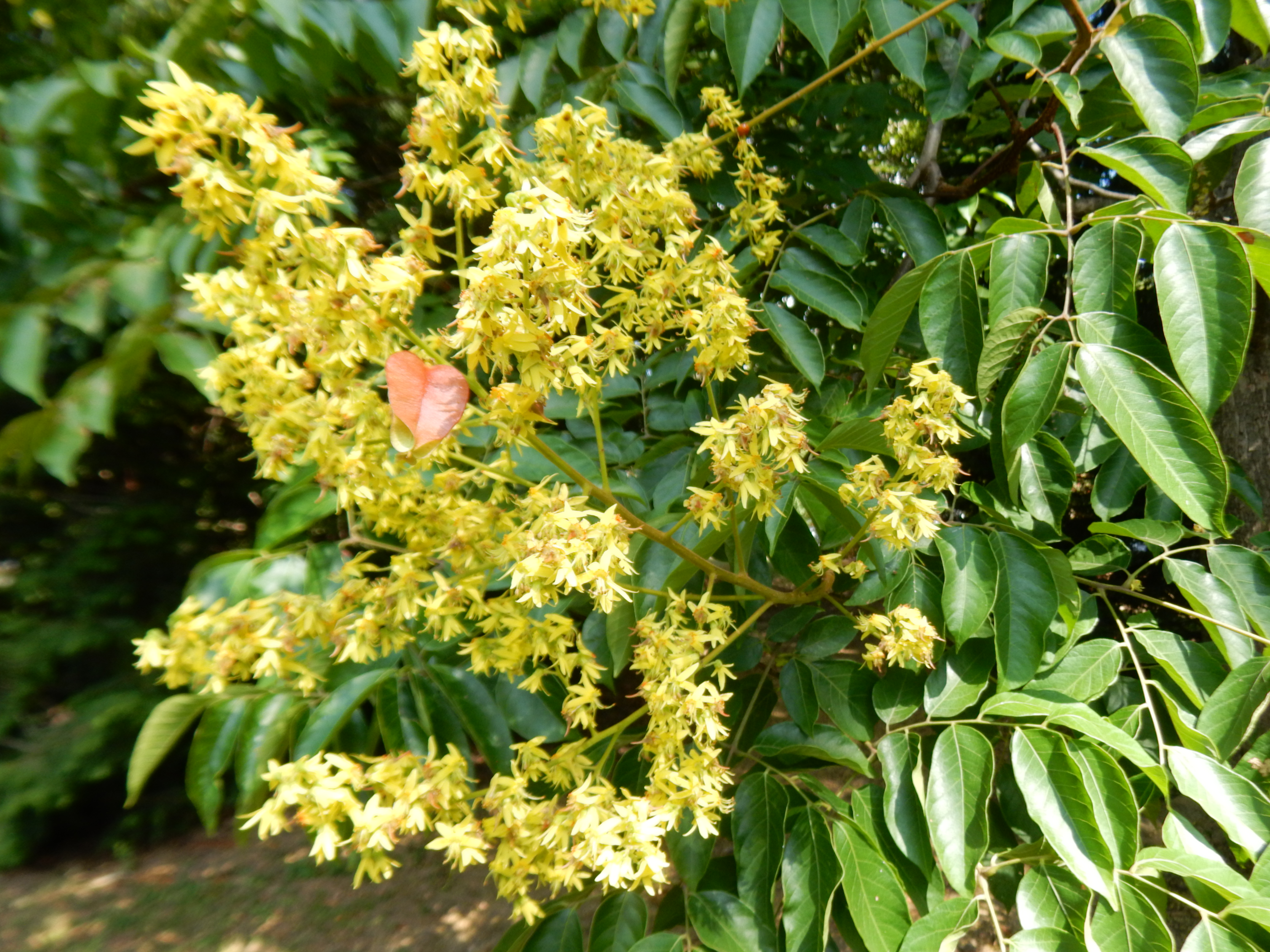
Flowers and foliage

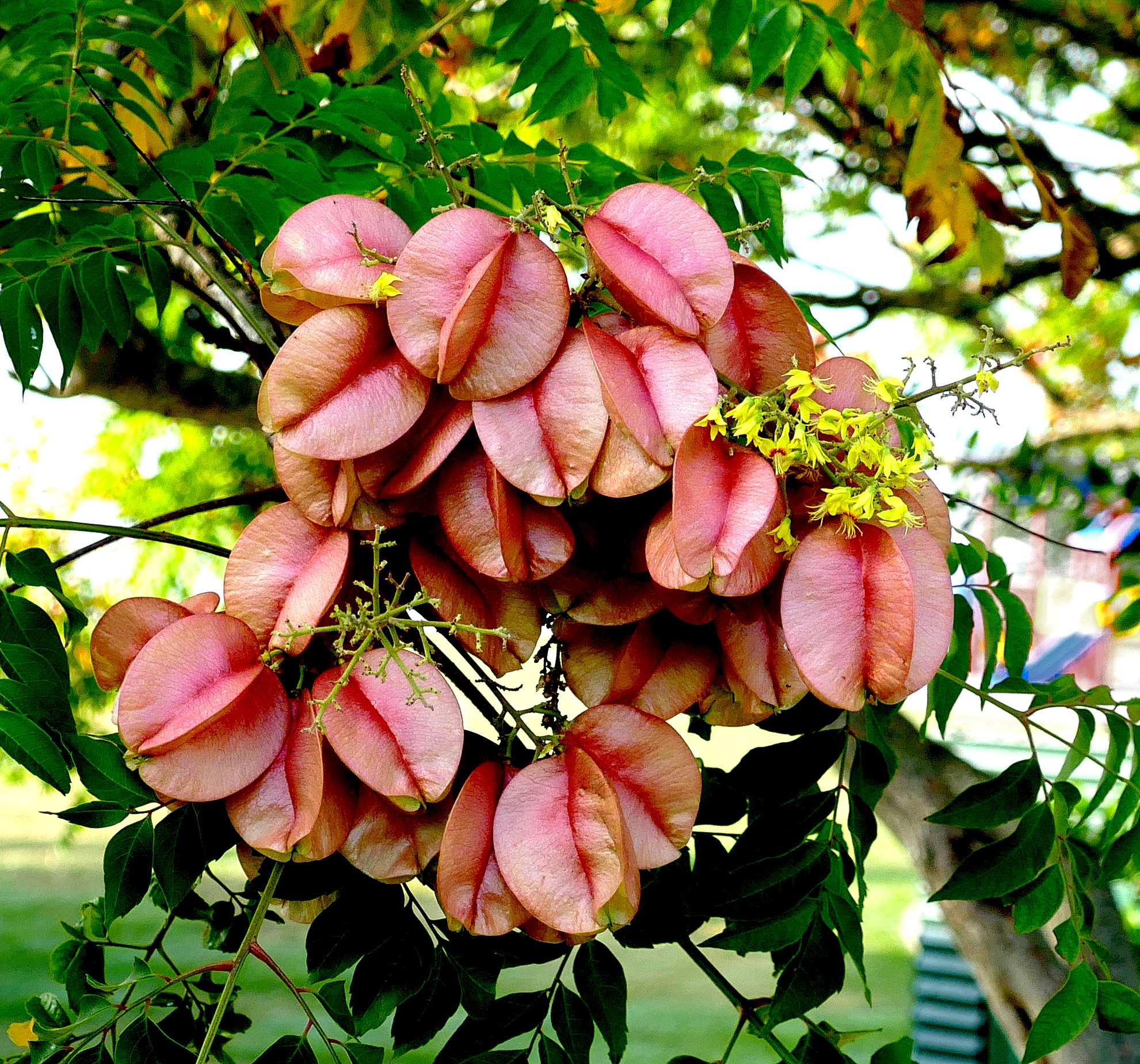
Fruits or seed pods

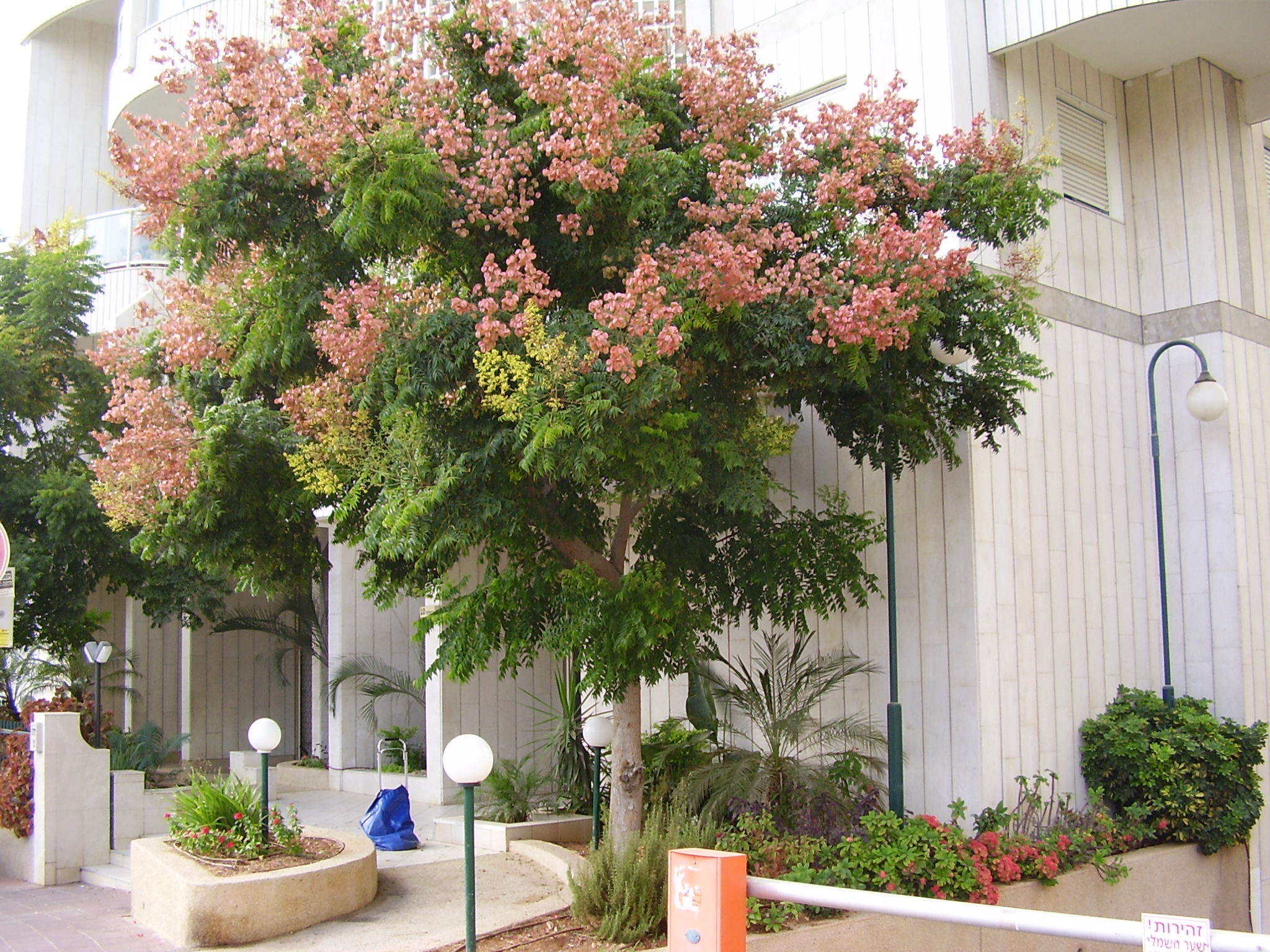
Cultivated tree

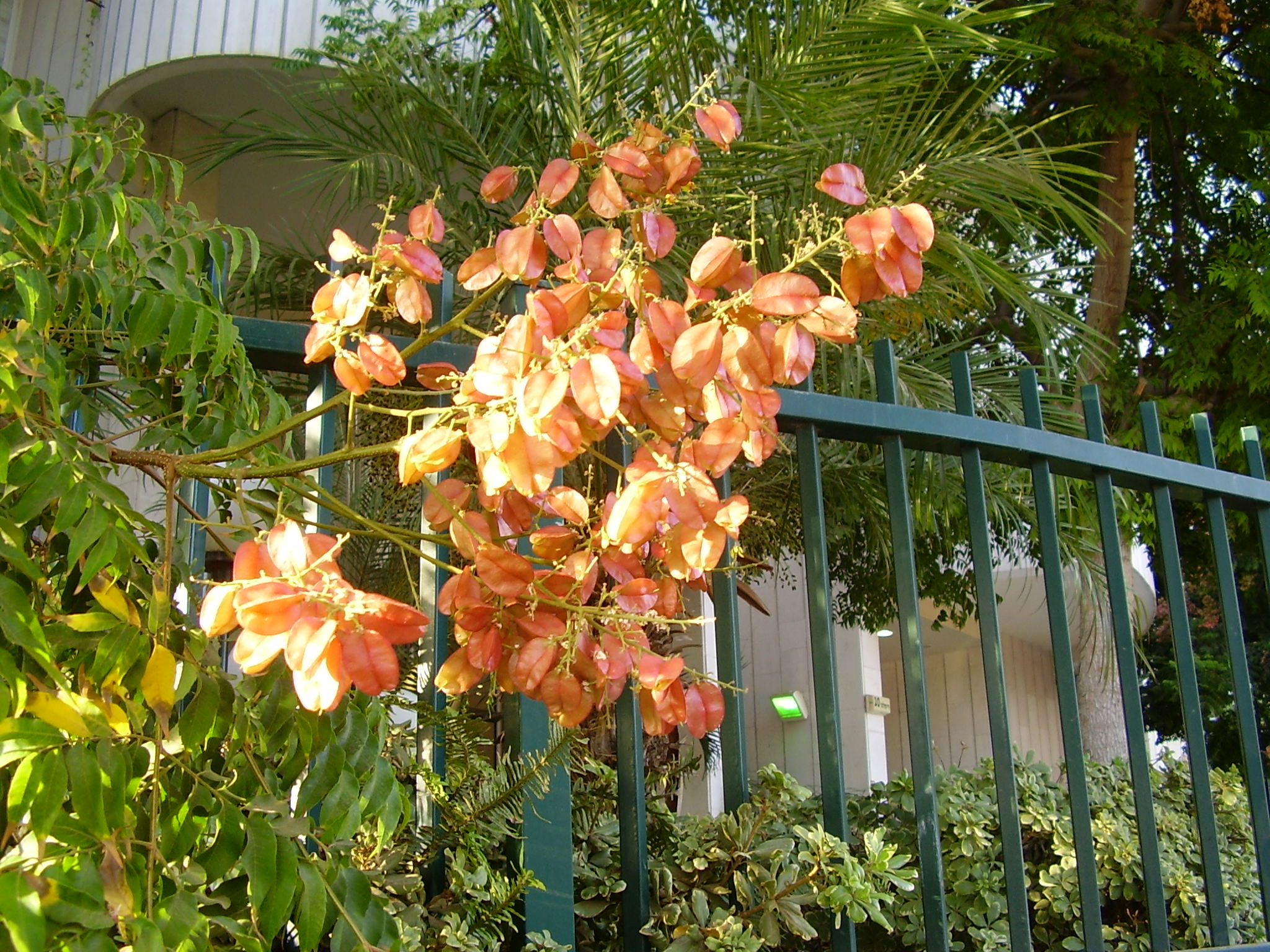
Yellow golden seed pods

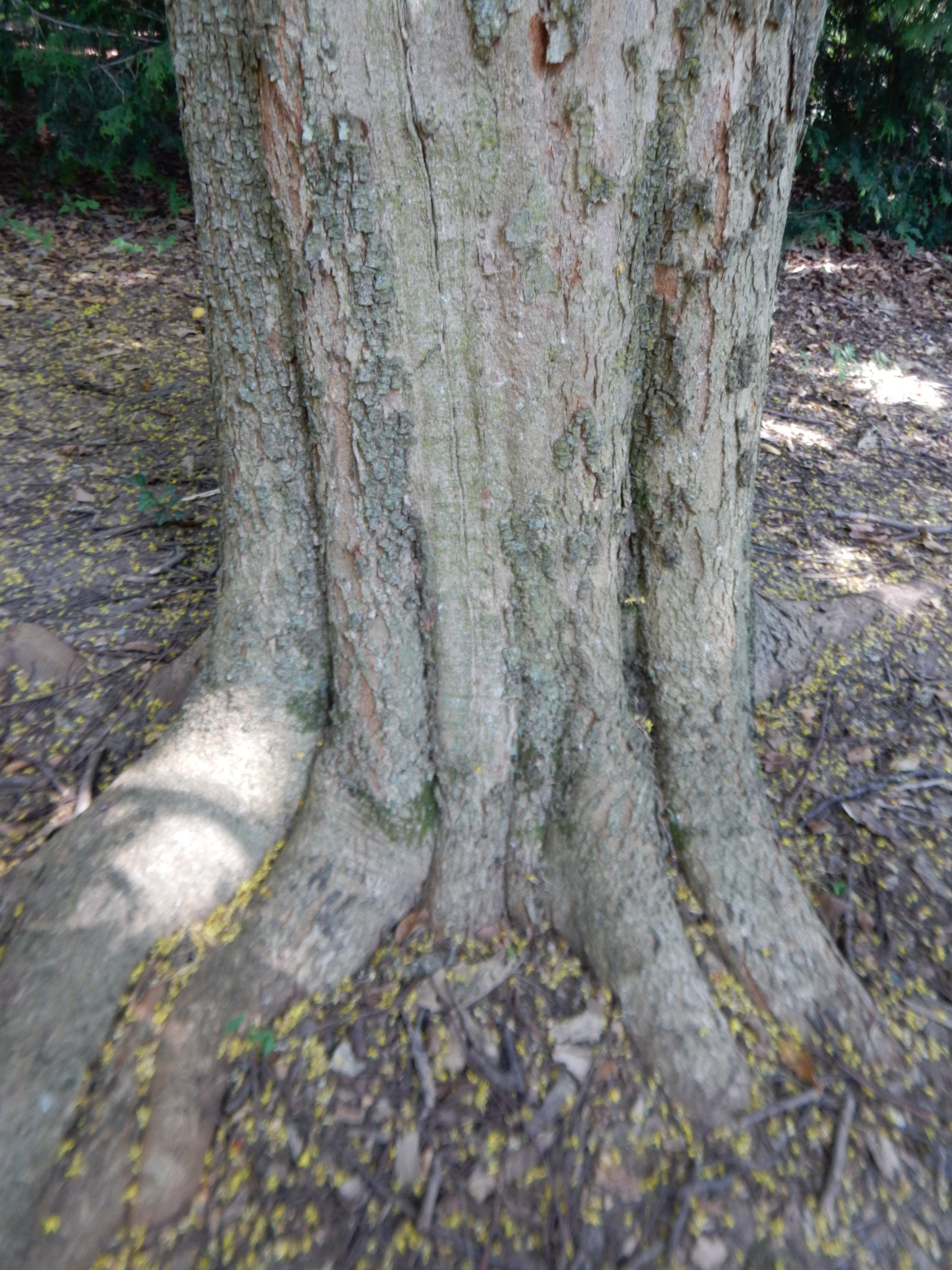
Bark and trunk base
