= Sanemon =

Japanese castaway

Sanemon (Japanese: 三右衛門, romanized: Sanemon; Russian: Санима, romanized: Sanima) was a Japanese castaway who drifted ashore in Kamchatka with nine others in 1710. After being immured for a period in the fortress of Verkhne-Kamchatsk, in 1713 he joined Ivan Petrovitch Kozyrevski's expedition to the northern Kuriles. The following year he was sent to Saint Petersburg, where he is said to have become Dembei's assistant at the Japanese language school founded in the city by Peter the Great.
