= Andrei Ivanovich Bogdanov =

Russian bibliographer and ethnographer

Andrei Ivanovich Bogdanov (Russian: Андрей Иванович Богданов; 1692 – September 11, 1766) was one of the first Russian bibliographers, and ethnographers.

Andrei Bogdanov was born in Siberia. His father was a gunpowder-maker, and Andrei had assisted him in his work. Once his family moved to newly founded Saint Petersburg, young Andrei Bogdanov went to the academy gymnasium (a secondary school run by the Russian Academy of Sciences). In 1719, according to Peter the Great's edict, Bogdanov began work in the field of typographical art. In 1730, he was assigned to the library of the Academy of Sciences.

His major literary and historic work was Description of Saint-Petersburg from the beginning in the year 1703 up to the year 1751, a first encyclopedic description of the newly built Russian capital, based on available archival materials and recollections of the eyewitnesses. The work was accomplished by 1751. Bogdanov, as its author, was awarded 50 rubles for it. However, it was first published only in 1779, after his death.

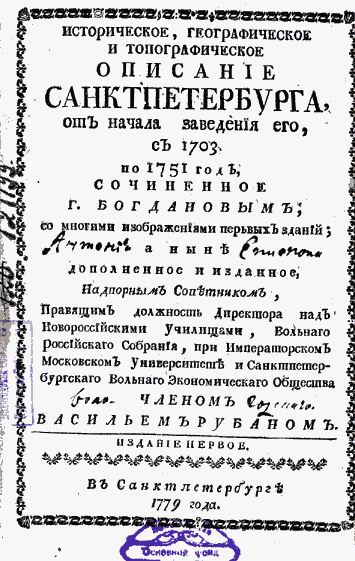
Book's cover

== See also ==
- Gonza
