= Erik Laxmann =

Finnish-Swedish explorer (1737–1796)

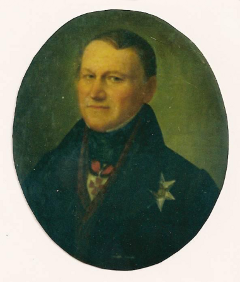
Erik Gustavovich Laxmann

Erik Gustavovich Laxmann (Russian: Эрик (Кирилл) Густавович Лаксман) (July 27, 1737 – January 6, 1796) was a Finnish-Swedish clergyman, explorer and natural scientist born in Savonlinna (Nyslott) in Finland, then part of Sweden. He is remembered today for his taxonomic work on the fauna of Siberia and for his attempts to establish relations between Imperial Russia and Tokugawa Japan.

In 1757, Laxmann started his studies at the Royal Academy of Turku (Åbo) and was subsequently ordained a Lutheran priest in St. Petersburg, the capital of Russia.

== Siberia ==
In 1764, he was appointed as a preacher in a small parish in Barnaul in Southwestern Siberia, whence he undertook a number of exploratory journeys, reaching Irkutsk, Baikal, Kyakhta and the border to China. His collection of material on the fauna of Siberia made him famous in scientific circles.

=== Irkutsk ===
In 1780, Laxmann settled in Irkutsk, where he would spend much of the rest of his life. In 1782, Laxmann founded a museum in Irkutsk, which is the oldest in Siberia. Laxmann also ran a glass factory in a suburb of Irkutsk, around 6 versts (~6 kilometers) away from the center of the city with a famous merchant Alexander Andreyevich Baranov as a business partner; the factory was roughly 36 metres (20 ken) square. Products were not only sold domestically, but also to northeastern China.

Although he had many connections to local people of importance, Laxmann developed an antagonistic relationship with Grigory Shelikhov, a seafarer and merchant. Laxmann noticed that Shelikhov, along with the Irkutsk Governor-General's Office had tried to pressure Daikokuya Kōdayū, a Japanese castaway, into staying in Russia and serving as a translator for the merchant. The fact that Shelikhov also had strong connections with some Russian bureaucrats made the situation more complex. After Laxmann went to St.Petersburg on Kodayu's behalf, he began to send letters directly to Grand Chancellor Alexander Bezborodko (due to the Chancellor's high position, the use of intermediaries was normally required).

== Saint Petersburg and academic endeavours ==
Upon return to Saint Peterburg from Barnaul in 1768, Laxmann gave up his career in religion and dedicated himself to science. A springboard for his scientific career was the membership in the Free Economic Society, one of the first economic societies in Europe that was sponsored by Empress Catherine. The scientific achievements of Erik Laxmann were recognized and in 1770, he was appointed professor of chemistry and economy at the Russian Academy of Sciences. In 1769, Laxmann was elected a foreign member of the Royal Swedish Academy of Sciences. Lively correspondence with Swedish scholars instigated Laxman to join the Swedish society Pro Fide et Christianismo as a founding member.

== Japan ==
=== Carl Peter Thunberg ===
Laxmann already had some knowledge about Japan before he met Japanese castaways, reading books written by Carl Peter Thunberg, with whom Laxmann had some communication.

=== Daikokuya Kodayu ===
In 1789, while doing research in Irkutsk, Laxmann came across six Japanese who had been found in Amchitka, one of the Aleutian Islands, by Russian furriers whose leader was a person called Nivizimov. Laxmann escorted the castaways to St. Petersburg, where Daikokuya Kōdayū, their nominal leader, pleaded with Empress Catherine the Great to be allowed to return to Japan. During this stay in the capital, Laxmann began discussions on various matters with Alexander Bezborodko, but succumbed to a bout of typhoid fever which left him incapacitated for three months.

Laxmann recovered consciousness in early May when Catherine had just moved to Tsarskoye Selo for the summer. Laxmann sent Kodayu to Tsarskoye Selo ahead of him, and Kodayu was able to meet with the Empress several times over six months, as a result of Laxman's dedicated efforts among the Russian bureaucracy, especially with Alexander Bezborodko and chancellor Alexander Vorontsov. At each presentation at Tsarskoye Selo, Laxmann walked along with Kodayu in order to assist him in the proper etiquette required in the Empress' presence.

In 1791, Catherine agreed to a plan conceived by Laxman, under which Laxman's son, Lt. Adam Laxman would command a voyage to Japan, where he would exchange the castaways for economic agreements and concessions. Grigory Shelikhov had proposed another plan that would make the Japanese castaways Russian citizens so that they would be Japanese teachers and translators, but Catherine chose Laxmann and Bezborodko's plan. The elder Laxmann remained in Russia while his son traveled with the castaways.

=== Letters to Japanese scholars ===
Laxmann wrote letters to two Japanese scholars, Nakagawa Junan and Katsuragawa Hoshū, at the recommendation of Carl Peter Thunberg, their teacher. There is no record that the letters ever reached the scholars, even though Adam Laxmann handed the letters to Ishikawa Tadafusa, a staff member of Tokugawa Shogunate, in Matsumae, Hokkaidō. Erik Laxmann had shown Kodayu the letters before Kodayu left Okhotsk. Katsuragawa Hoshu had much communication with Kodayu after Kodayu lived in Yedo so Hoshu edited some books on Russia and Kodayu's experience. It would be possible to think that Hoshu may have known that Laxmann had sent him a letter.

== His family ==
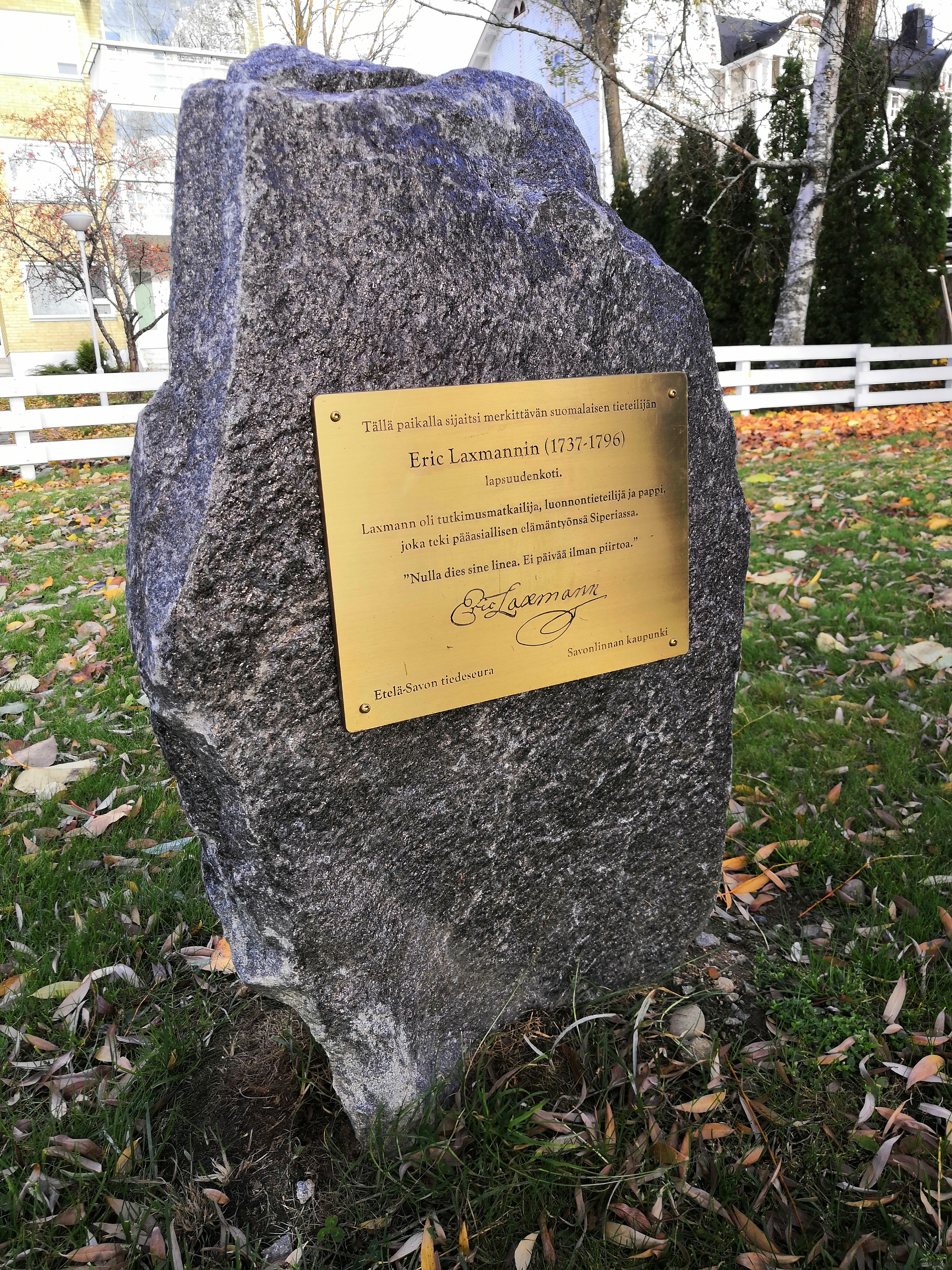
Erik Laxmann memorial in Savonlinna, his childhood home

Laxmann had a wife, Yekaterina Ivanovna, five sons, Gustav, Adam, one who died young, Afernaci and Martin and a daughter Mariya. He also lived with his younger brother, his wife and their two daughters, Anna and Elizabeta. Laxmann also had another younger brother, who lived in St. Petersburg.

== See also ==
- Dembei
- Matsumae clan
