= Culture of Japan =

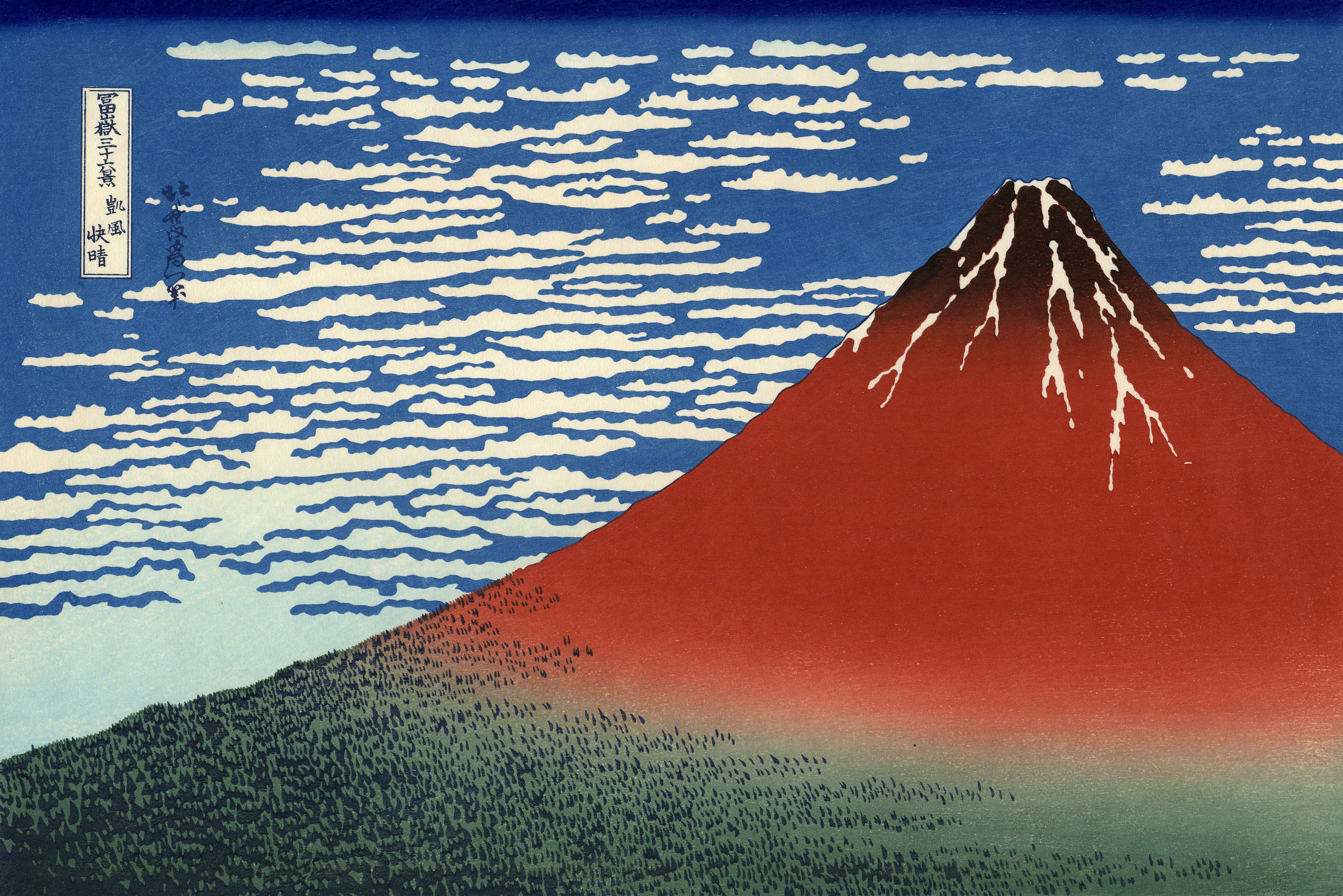
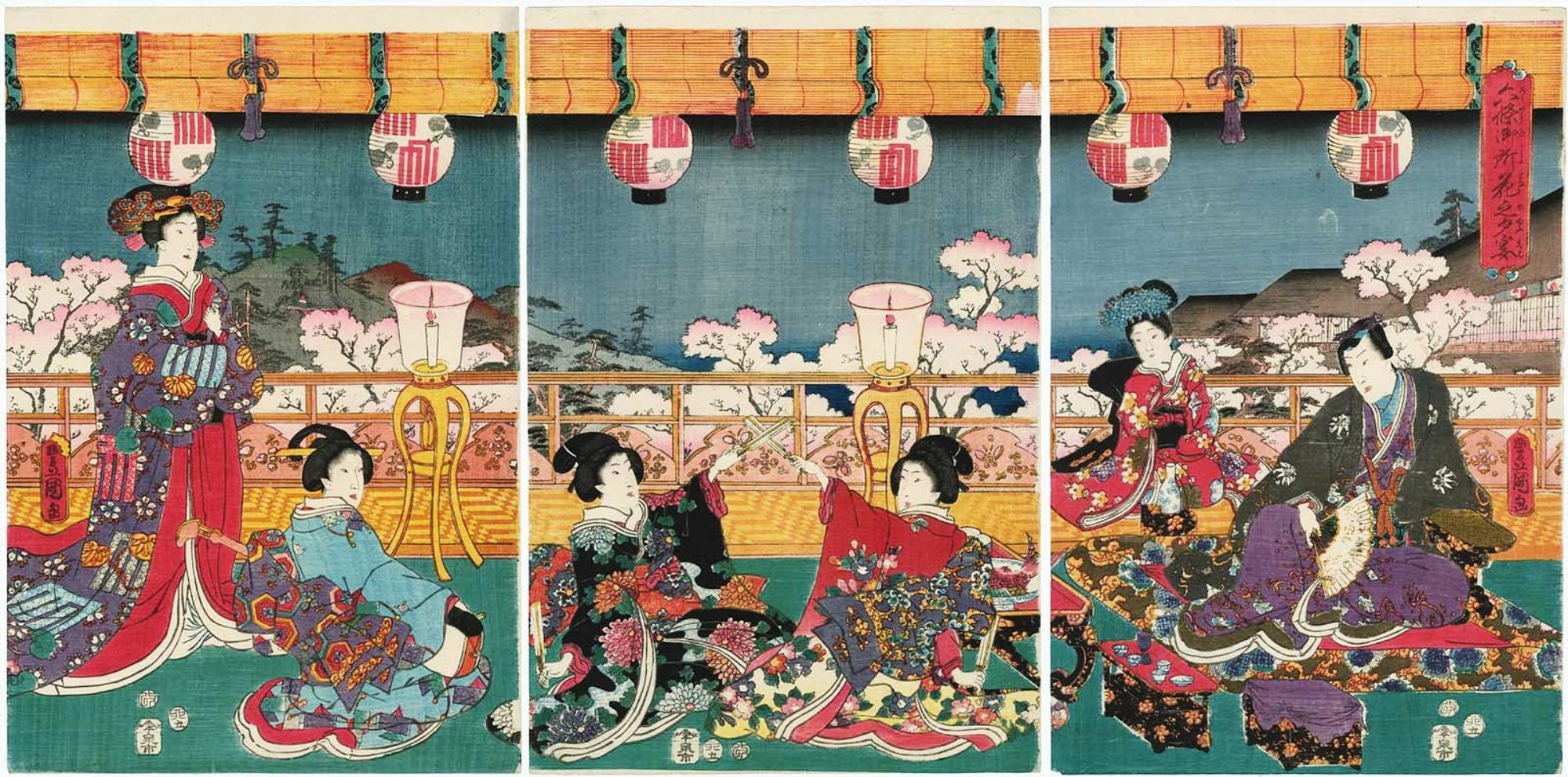
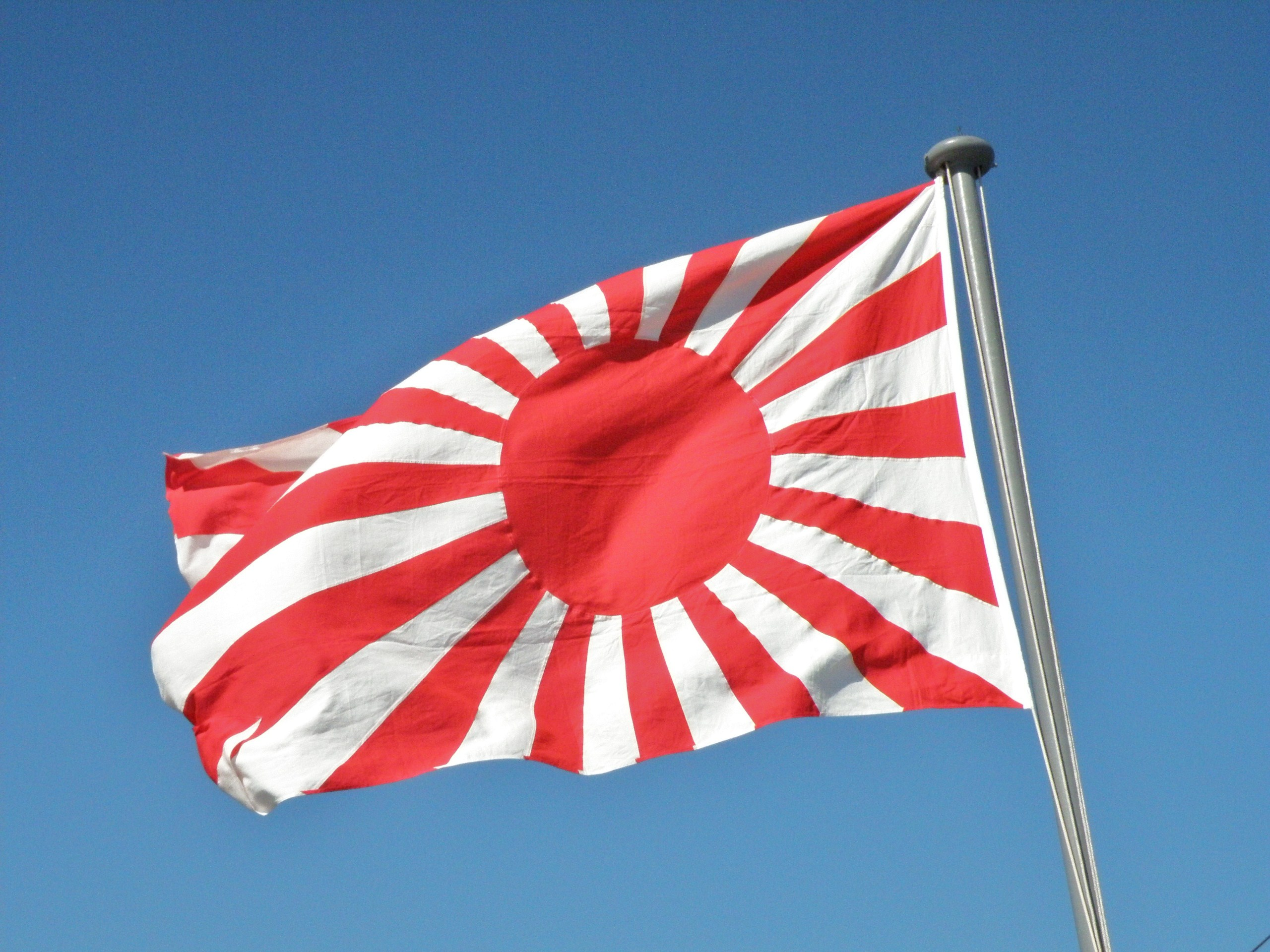
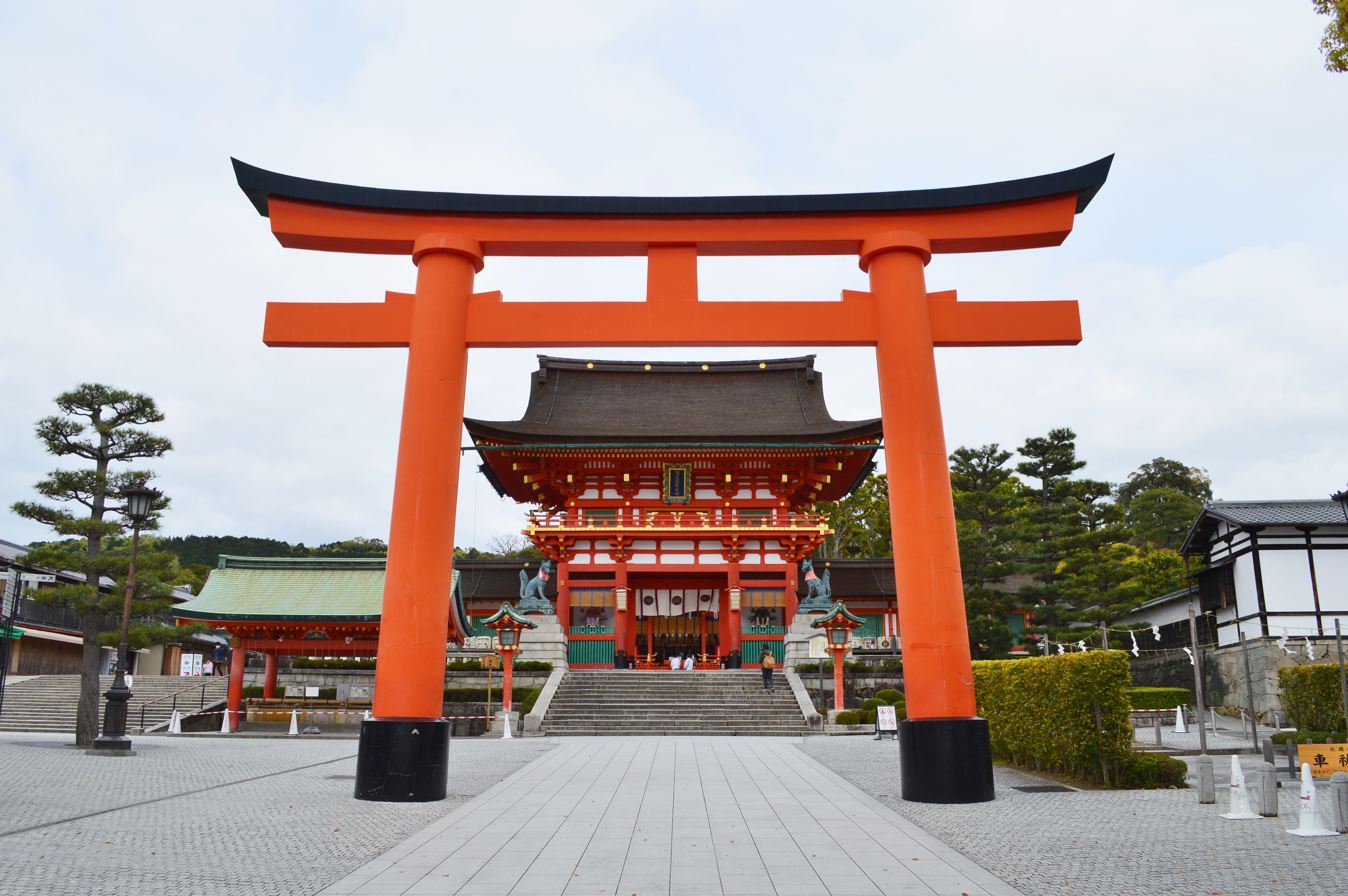
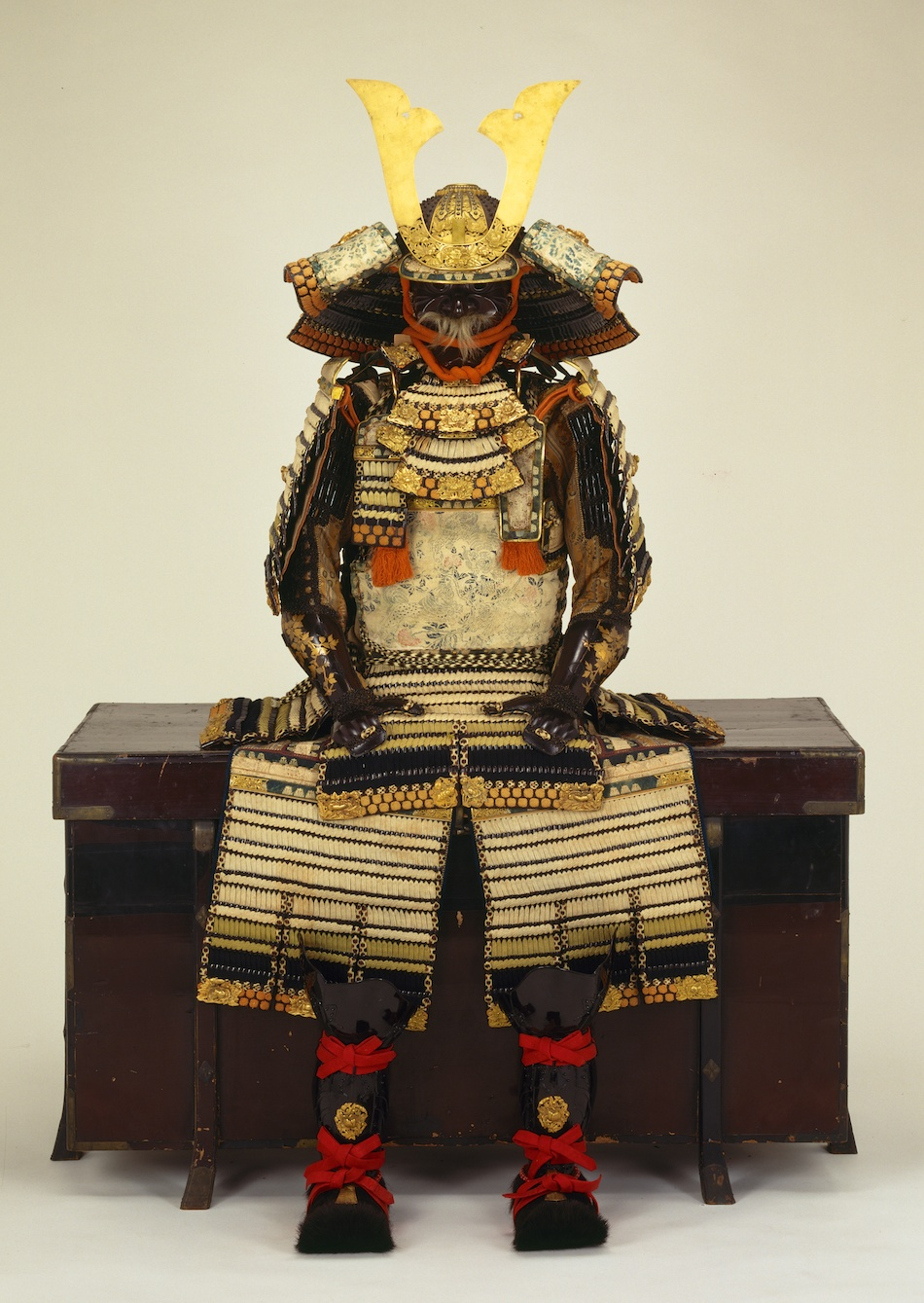
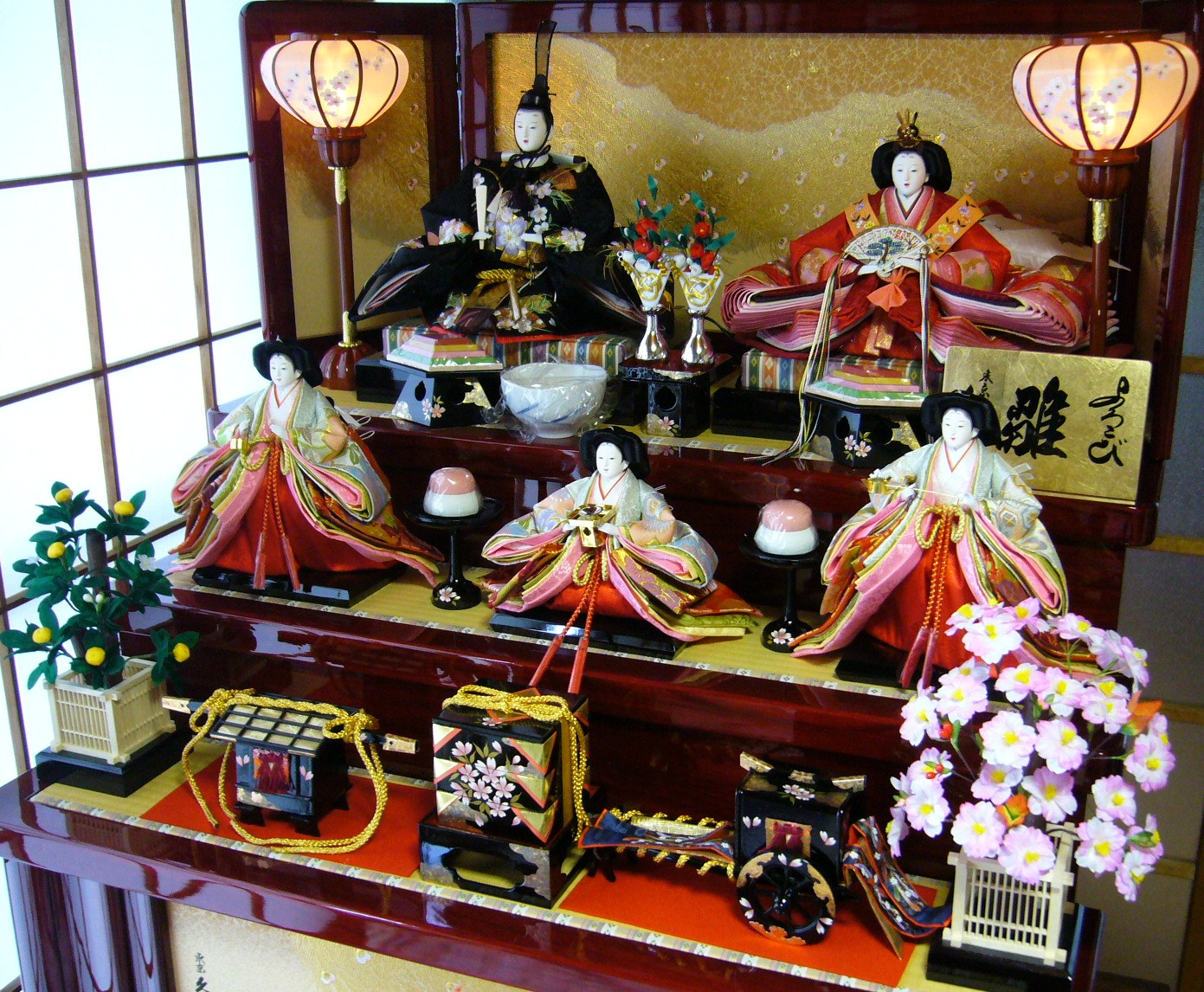
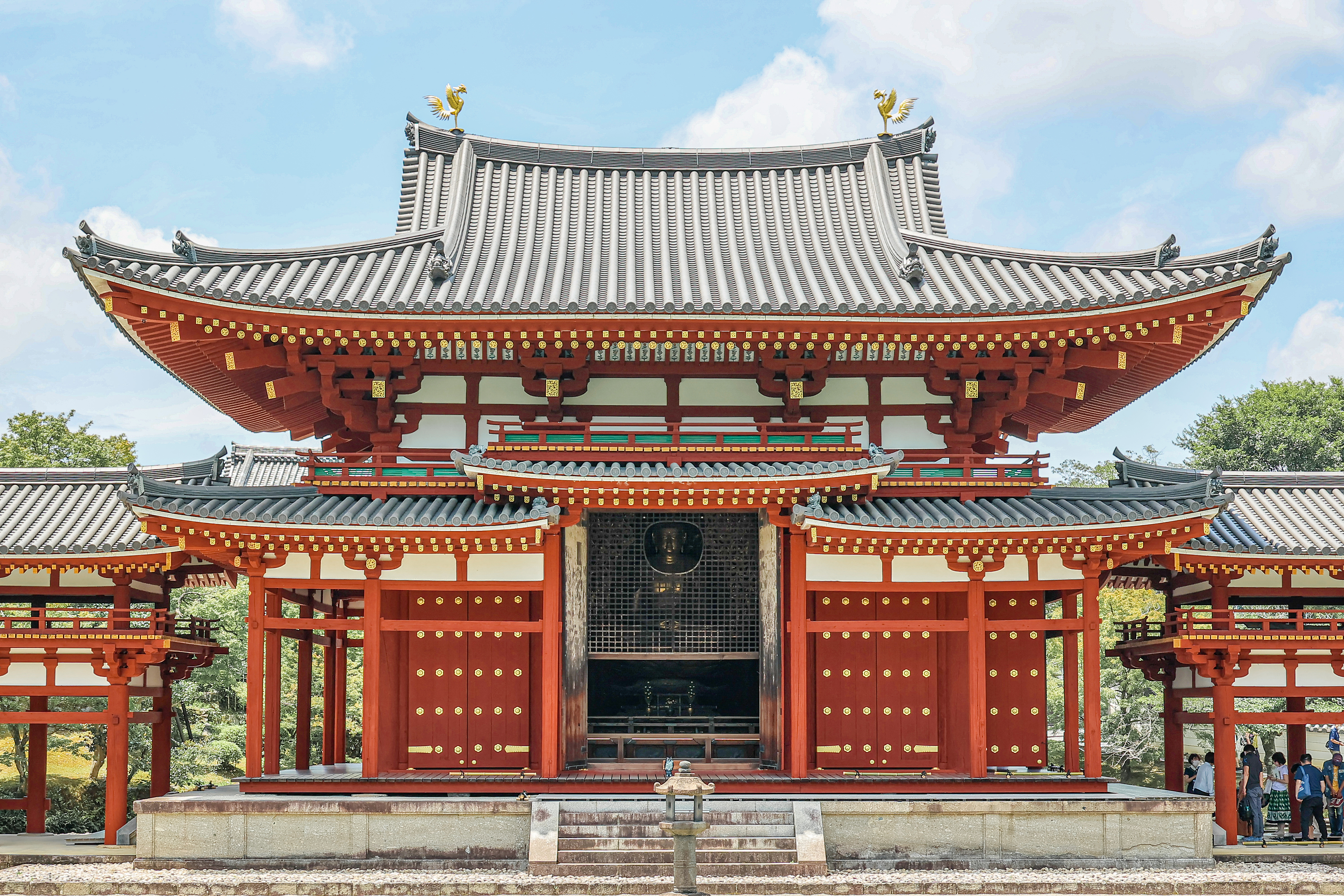
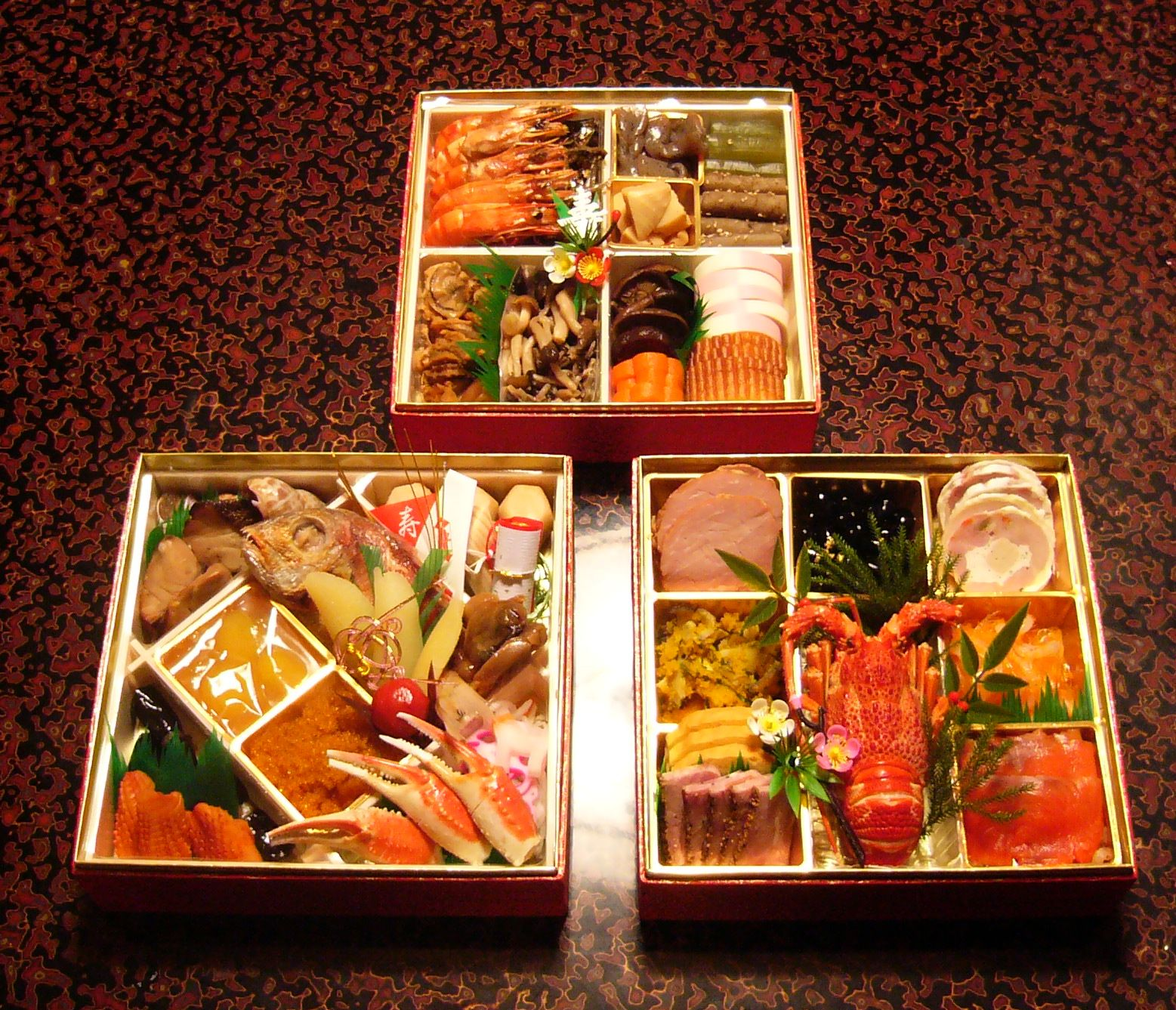
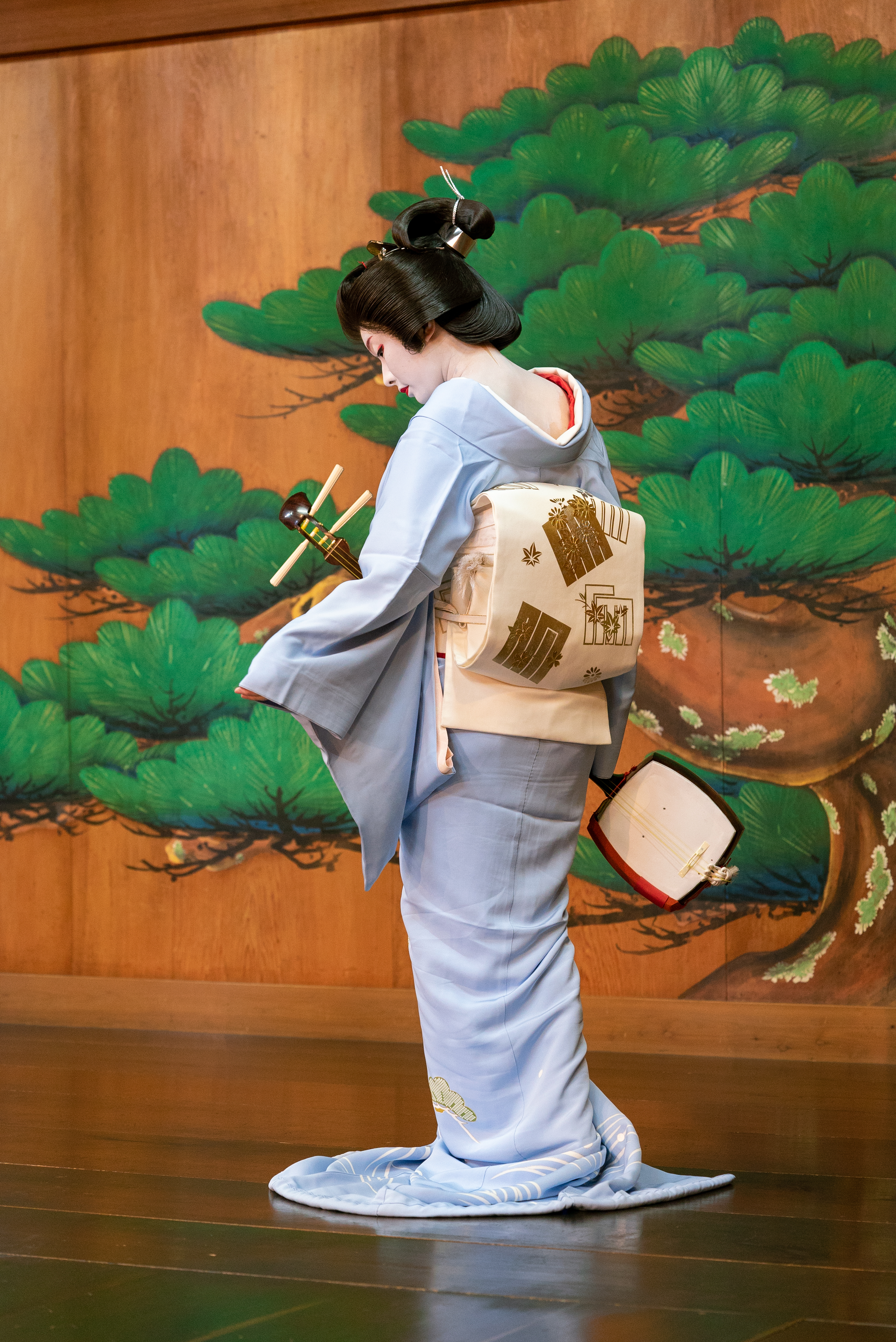
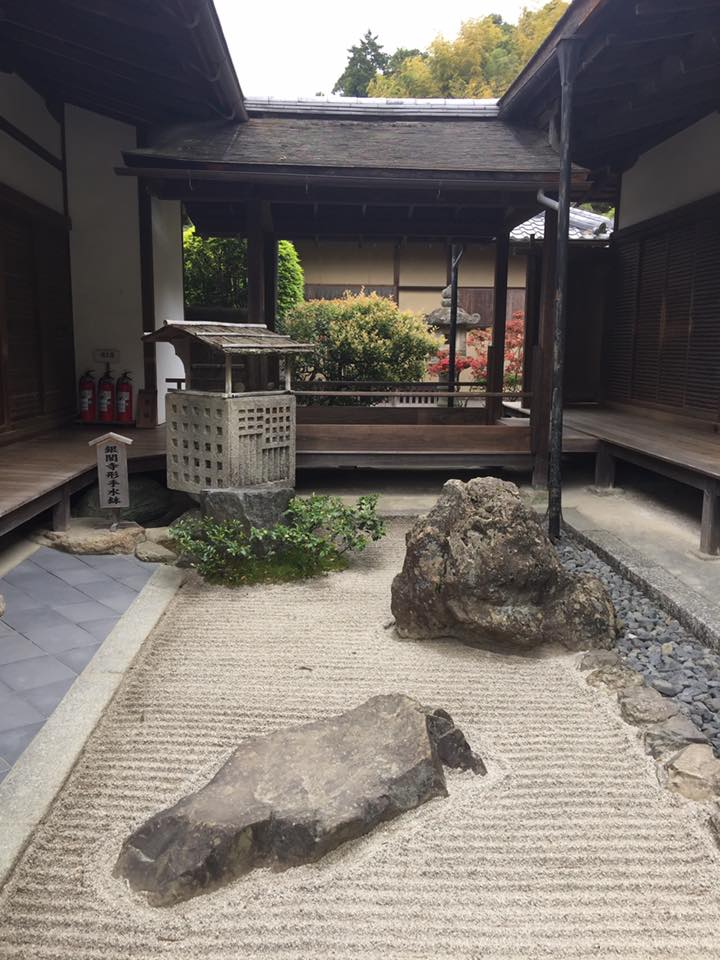
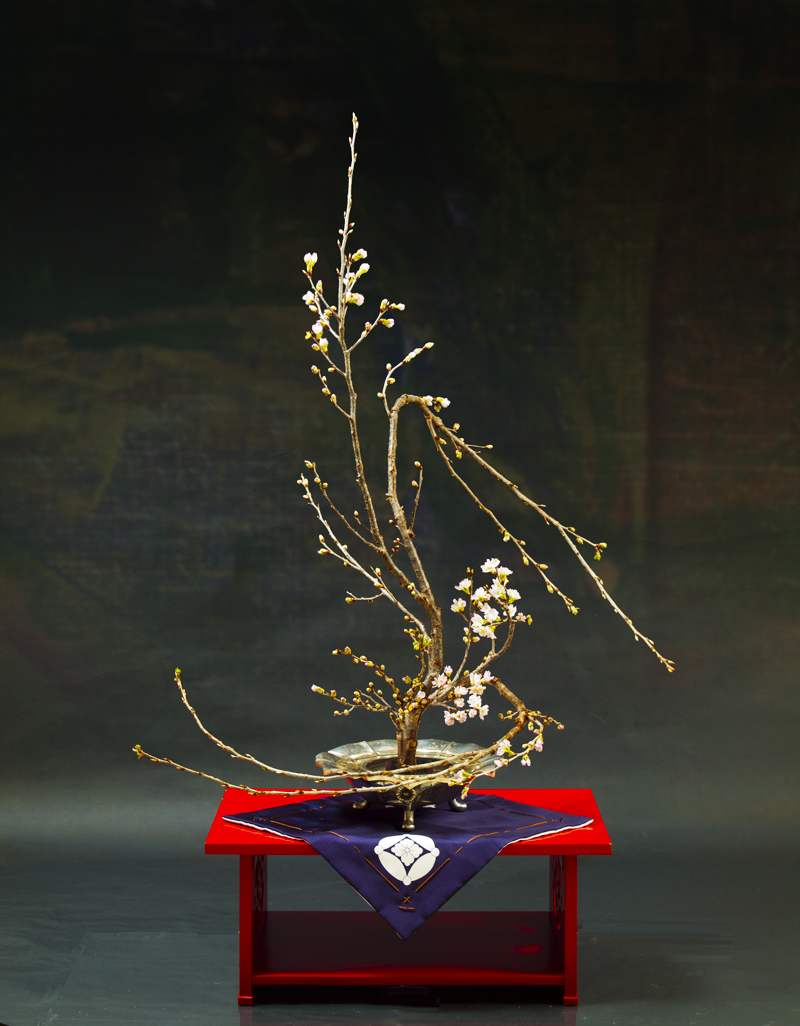
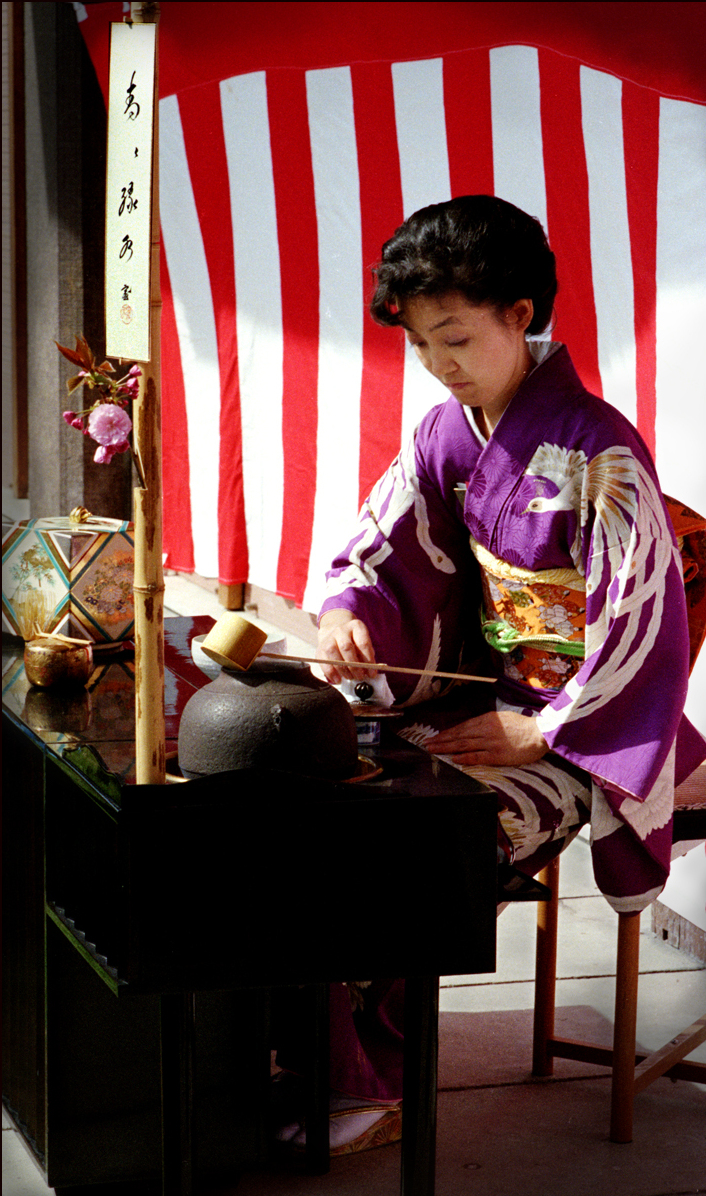
Representative elements of Japanese culture
Top：Ukiyo-e (Fine Wind, Clear Morning, Rukujogosho hanami),Rising Sun Flag
Second left：The Great Buddha of Kamakura at Kōtoku-in
Second center：The Torii and Rōmon of Fushimi Inari-taisha
Second right：The Body armor and Kabuto in Edo period
Third left：Hinamatsuri (Girl's dolls day of Peach festival)
Third center：Byōdō-in (Wayō architectural style of Heian period)
Third right：Osechi (Bento boxes of New Year)
Bottom：Geisha, Zen garden, Ikebana, Teaism

Japanese culture has changed greatly over the millennia, from the country's prehistoric Jōmon period, to its contemporary modern culture, which absorbs influences from Asia and other regions of the world.

Since the Jomon period, ancestral groups like the Yayoi and Kofun, who arrived to Japan from Korea and China, respectively, have shaped Japanese culture. Rice cultivation and centralized leadership were introduced by these groups, shaping Japanese culture. Chinese dynasties, particularly the Tang dynasty, have influenced Japanese culture throughout history and brought it into the Sinosphere. After 220 years of isolation, the Meiji era opened Japan to Western influences, enriching and diversifying Japanese culture. Popular culture shows how much contemporary Japanese culture influences the world. As of 2023, Japan's overseas exports of cultural content recorded 5,776.9 billion yen.

== Identity ==
=== History ===
There are two competing hypotheses that try to explain the lineage of the Japanese people.

The first hypothesis proposes a dual-structure model, in which Japanese populations are descendants of the indigenous Jōmon people and later arrivals of people from the East Eurasian continent, known as the Yayoi people. Japan's indigenous culture originates primarily from the Yayoi people who settled in Japan between 1000 BCE and 300 CE. Yayoi culture spread to the main island of Honshu, mixing with the native Jōmon culture. Modern Japanese have an estimated 80% Yayoi and 20% Jōmon ancestry.

The second hypothesis proposes a tripartite model of genomic origin. This hypothesis proposes that contemporary Japanese people are from three distinct ancestral groups: Jōmon, Yayoi and Kofun, with 13%, 16% and 71% of genetic ancestry, respectively. During the Kofun period, it is said that migrant groups from China came to Japan and settled on the island, bringing with them various cultural advances and centralized leadership. The migrants who came to Japan during the Kofun period appear to have had ancestry that mainly resembles the ancestry of the Han Chinese population of China. The Jomon people were hunter-gathers; the Yayoi people introduced rice cultivation; and the Kofun migrants introduced imperial state formation.

Japanese culture was influenced from ancient times to the Middle Ages primarily by multiple Chinese dynasties, with substantial derivation from the Tang dynasty, and to a lesser extent by other Asian countries. For example, one of the scripts for writing in the Japanese language is Chinese characters (kanji), but Japanese has no genetic relationship with Chinese. Since the Meiji era, Japan has been primarily influenced by Western countries.

During the Tokugawa shogunate, the inhabitants of Japan experienced over 220 years of relative isolation from the outside world until the arrival of the Black Ships precipitated the Meiji Restoration and subsequent Meiji era.

The Showa period underwent a cultural mobilization as arts, literature, and architecture were co-opted to promote imperial nationalism and traditional warrior values until reforms dismantled state Shinto at the end of World War II, introducing a democratic constitution, and giving citizens new civil freedoms. The period experienced the birth of modern consumerism, and popular culture icons like anime and convenience stores known as konbini.

Today, the culture of Japan stands as one of the most influential cultures around the world, mainly because of the global reach of its popular culture. In 2023, U.S. News & World Report ranked Japan's cultural influence as the highest in Asia and 4th worldwide.

== Language ==
Japanese is the national and primary language of Japan. The language features a lexically distinct pitch-accent system. Early Japanese is known primarily by its state in the 8th century when the three major works of Old Japanese were compiled. The earliest attestation of the Japanese language was found in a Chinese document from 256 CE. However, the Japanese language has no genetic relationship with Chinese, nor any clear affiliation with any other language. While there are a number of theories about the origins of Japanese, the strongest arguments for affiliation are with Korean on the basis of similar syntax. More controversially, it has also been paired with Altaic languages due to a similar number of systems and verb forms. While Japanese is the only official language of Japan, other languages such as Ainu and Ryukyuan are spoken on the Japanese islands.

Written Japanese uses a combination of three scripts: Chinese characters pronounced as "kanji" (漢字) in Japanese, hiragana, and katakana. Japan had no writing system prior to adopting kanji from China in 751 CE, and like Chinese, kanji are used extensively in Japanese as logograms. Presently, there is a notable number of kanji in modern Japanese with a different meaning from the corresponding hanzi character used in modern Chinese. Modern Japanese also features far fewer simplified Chinese characters in comparison to modern Chinese as Japanese typically uses fewer kanji, mainly for nouns, adjective stems, and verb stems. Both hiragana and katakana are phonetic syllabaries derived from man'yōgana, a phonetic Chinese characters originating in the 5th century and maturing in the 8th. Hiragana and katakana were developed from simplified kanji; hiragana emerged somewhere around the 9th century. Women used hiragana informally, while men used katakana formally. By the 10th century, both systems were common.

Japanese vocabulary consists of 49% words of Chinese origin, 33% words of Japanese origin, and 18% loanwords from other languages, including European languages, words of mixed origin, and the made-in-Japan pseudo-English known as wasei-eigo. The Latin alphabet is often used in modern Japanese, especially for company names, logos, advertising, and when inputting Japanese into a computer. The Hindu–Arabic numerals are often used for numbers and can be read in either Japanese or English, but traditional Sino–Japanese numerals are also common. The influence of Japanese culture in the Western world over the past few centuries has led to many of its terms, such as origami, tsunami, karaoke, and pop cultural terms like shonen and shōjo being incorporated into the English language. Words like these have also been added to the Oxford English Dictionary.

== Religion ==
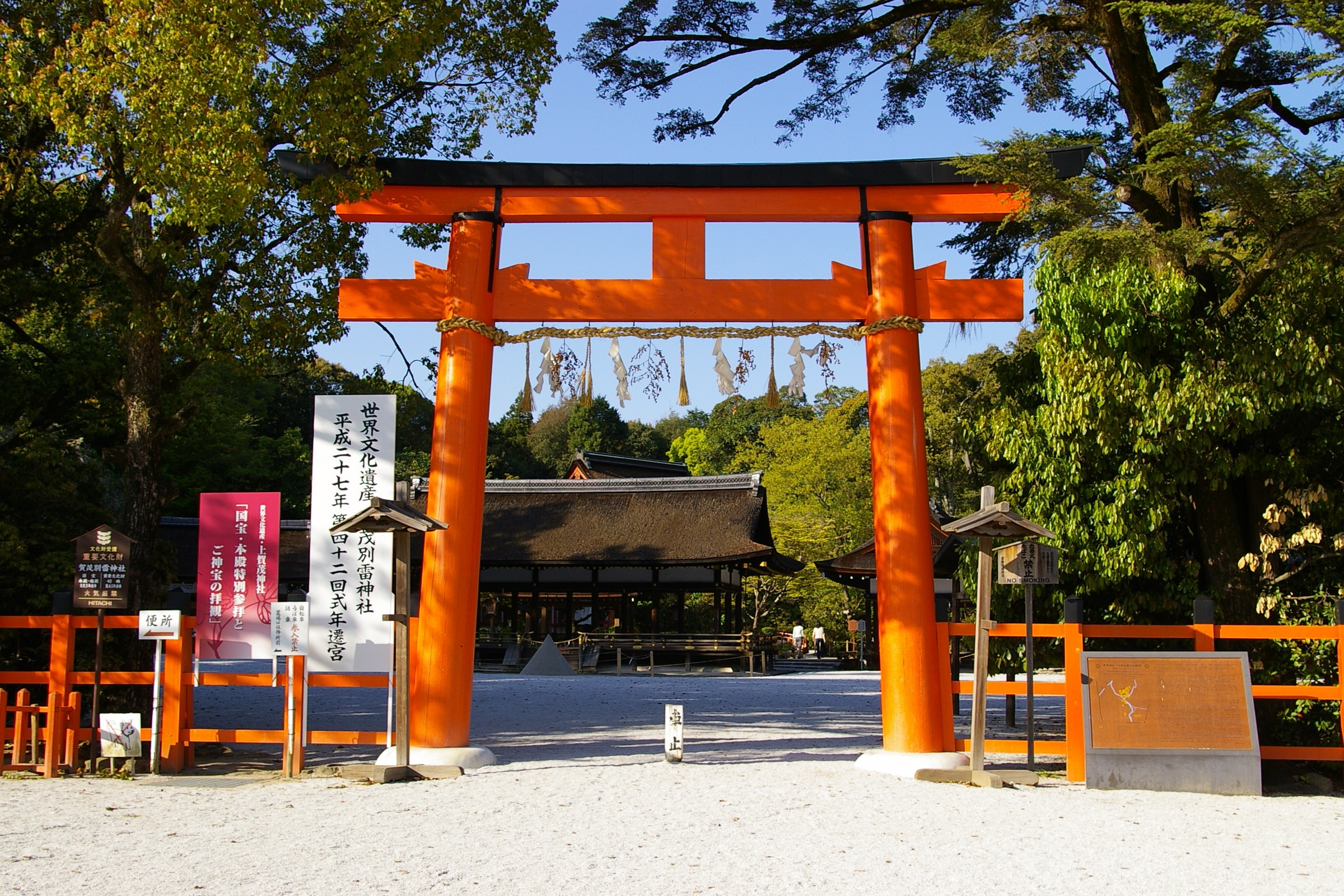
Torii entrance gate at Kamigamo Shrine, Kyoto

Amida Buddha, Kōtoku-in

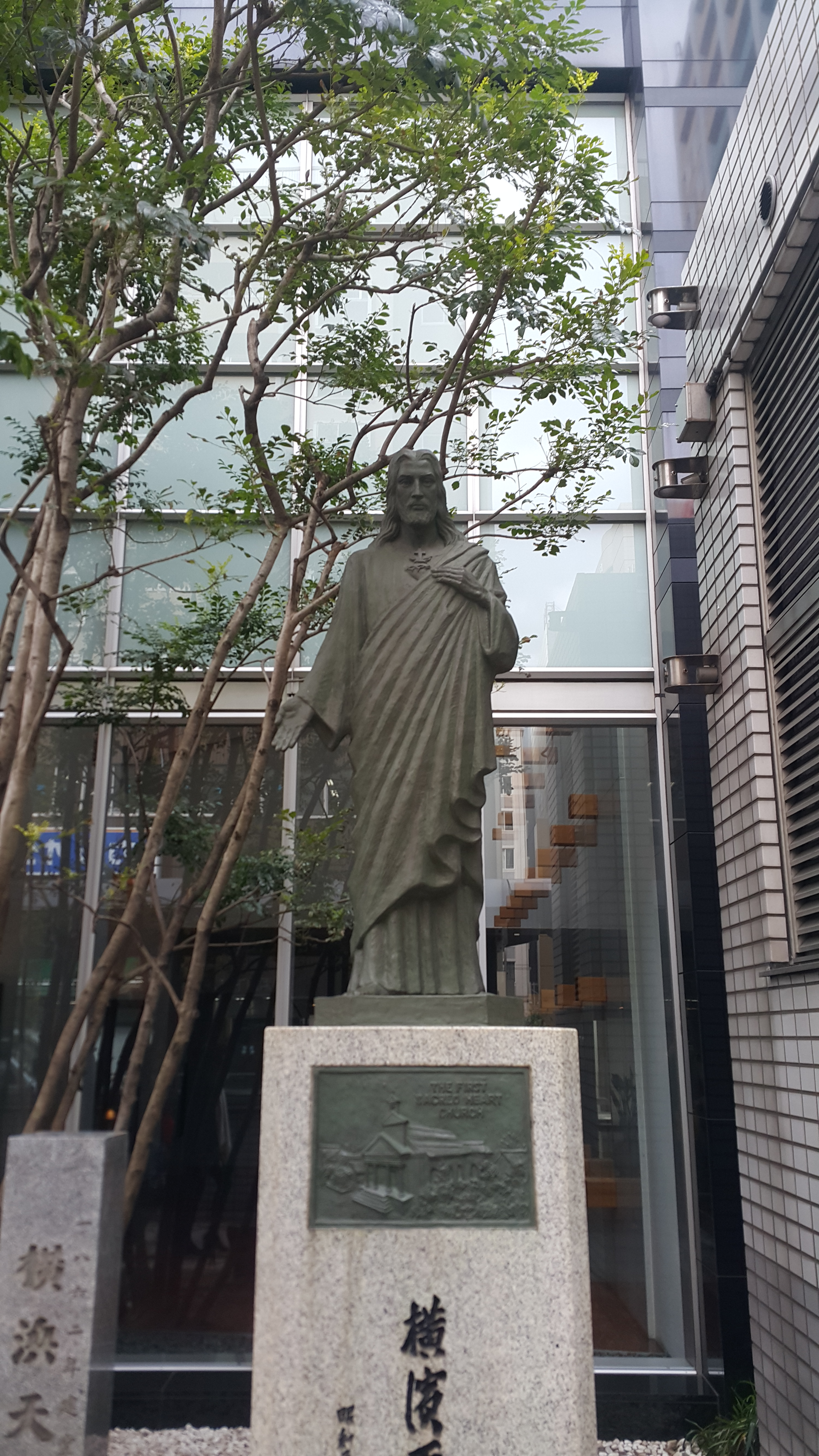
Jesus statue in Yokohama

Shinto and Buddhism are the primary religions of Japan. According to the annual statistical research on religion in 2018 by the Government of Japan's Agency for Culture Affairs, 66.7 percent of the population practices Buddhism, 25.6 percent practices Shintoism, 7.7 percent other religions. According to the annual statistical research on religion in 2018 by the Government of Japan's Agency for Culture Affairs, about two million or around 1.5% of Japan's population are Christians. Other religions include Islam (70,000) and Judaism (2,000), which are largely immigrant communities with some ethnic Japanese practitioners.

=== Shinto ===
Shinto is an ethnic religion focusing on ceremonies and rituals. In Shinto, followers believe that kami – Shinto deities or spirits – are present throughout nature, including rocks, trees, and mountains. Humans can also be considered to possess a kami. One of the goals of Shinto is to maintain or strengthen the connection between humans, nature, and kami. The religion developed in Japan prior to the 6th century CE, after which point followers built shrines to worship kami.

=== Buddhism ===
Buddhism developed in India around the 6th and 4th centuries BCE and eventually spread through the Sinosphere and South East Asia. It arrived in Japan during the 6th century CE, where it was initially unpopular. Most Japanese people were unable to understand the difficult philosophical messages present in Buddhism; however, an appreciation for the religion's art and its close relation to China led to Buddhism growing in popularity by the 8th century.

=== Christianity ===
Christianity was introduced in the 16th century. When the religion was banned during the 17th century, a group of hidden Christians blended Christian theology with Shinto and Buddhist practices. Hidden Christian Sites in the Nagasaki Region have become World Heritage Sites, and the unique style of Christian art is now recognized.

Despite being a minority religion in Japan, Christian chapel marriage ceremonies are a popular wedding style in Japan.

=== Islam ===
A minority of Japanese are Muslims. Cultural differences and a predominantly non-Muslim society present unique challenges for Japan's Muslim community, mostly immigrants from Indonesia, Pakistan, Bangladesh, and Iran.

Muslims are scattered in Japan. Mosques and halal food are scarce due to their dispersion. Family-linked long-term residents are assimilating into Japanese society despite language and cultural barriers. Analysts say the small Muslim community and cultural differences between Islam and Japan reduce future conflicts. Syncretic Sufi Islam may increase Japan's Muslim population.

== National character ==
The Japanese "national character" has been written about under the term Nihonjinron, literally meaning 'theories/discussions about the Japanese people' and referring to texts on matters that are normally the concerns of sociology, psychology, history, linguistics, and philosophy, but emphasizing the authors' assumptions or perceptions of Japanese exceptionalism; these are predominantly written in Japan by Japanese people, though examples have also been written by foreign residents, journalists and even scholars.

== Literature ==
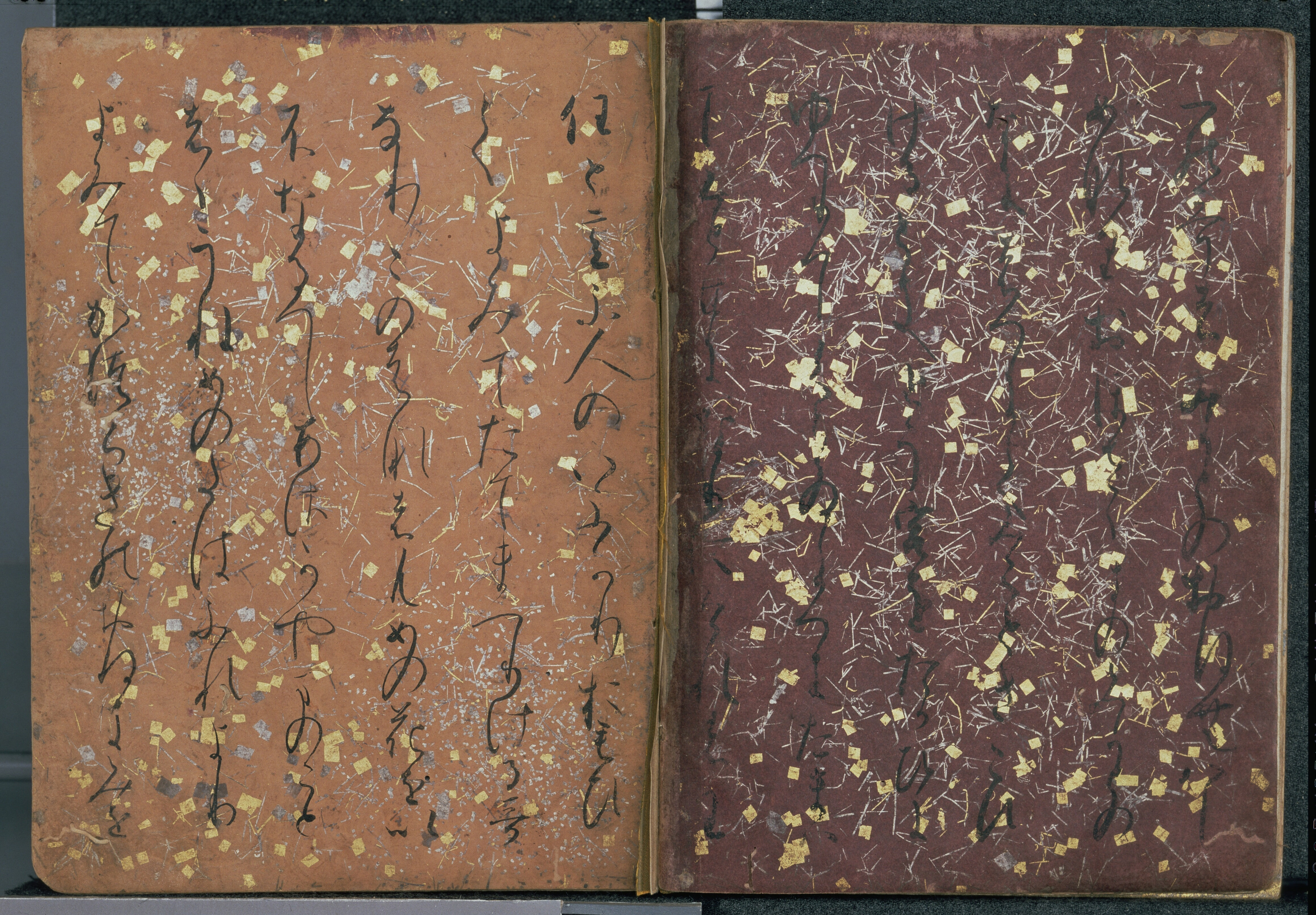
Kokin Wakashū, an early anthology of the waka form of Japanese poetry, National Treasure; early twelfth century; at the Tokyo National Museum

Early works of Japanese literature were heavily influenced by cultural contact with the Chinese Empire and Classical Chinese literature, often written in Classical Chinese (Kanbun) or utilizing Chinese characters for their phonetic properties. Eventually, classical Japanese literature developed into a distinct aesthetic style in its own right as court writers began utilizing unique phonetic syllabaries, particularly Hiragana, to compose native works like waka poetry and prose narratives. The Tale of Genji, written by the court lady Murasaki Shikibu during the peak of the Heian period, is recognized worldwide as a masterpiece of unique Japanese vernacular prose and is frequently cited as the world's first psychological novel. Since the Bakumatsu era, when the island nation reopened its treaty ports to Western maritime trade and diplomacy in the 19th century, Western and Eastern literary movements such as naturalism, realism, and modernist prose, have strongly affected each other through cross-cultural translations and continue to do so in contemporary global comparative literature.

== Visual arts ==
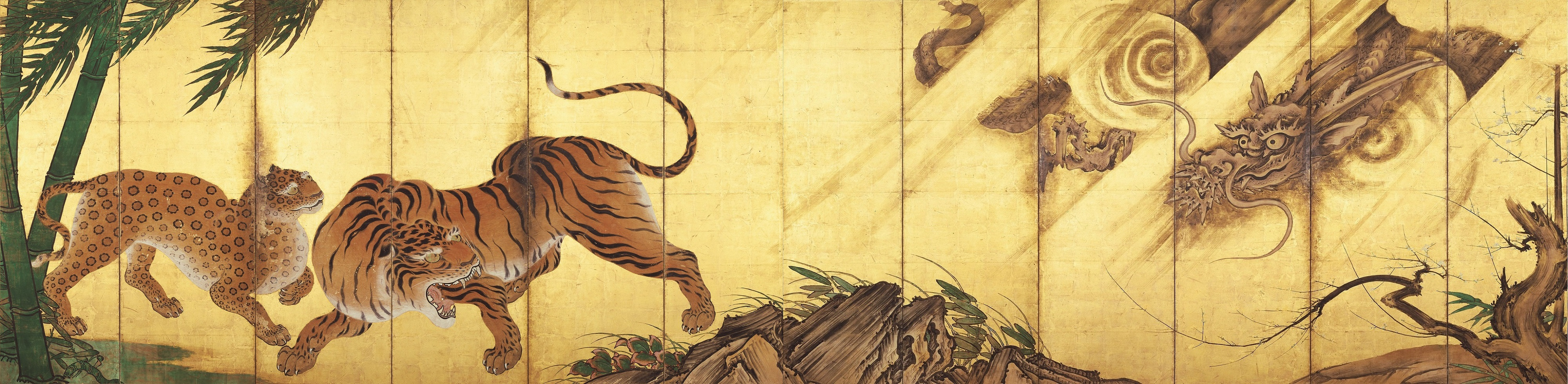
Pair of byōbu with a leopard, tiger and dragon by Kanō Sanraku

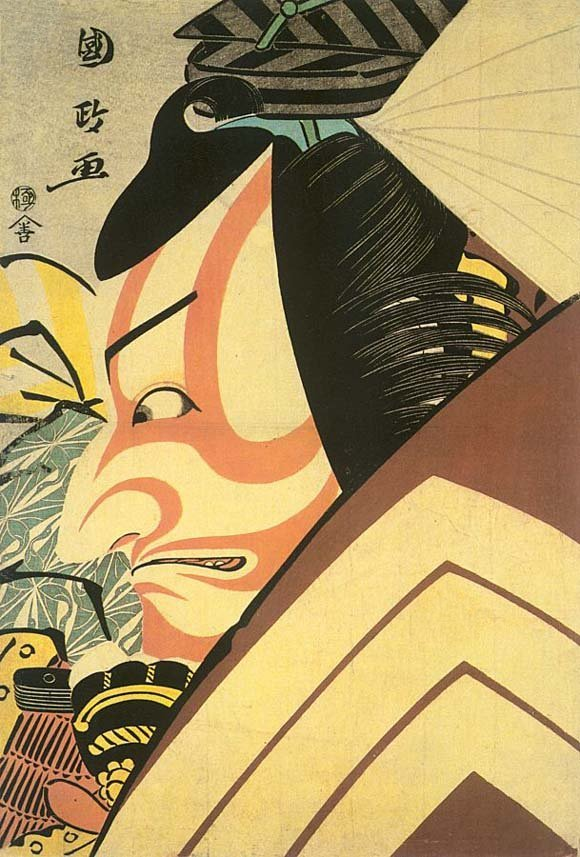
Ukiyo-e based on kabuki actor Ichikawa Danjūrō V, by Utagawa Kunimasa

Japanese calligraphy (書道, shodō, "the way of writing") is a traditional Japanese art and East Asian calligraphic discipline. Japanese calligraphers use the traditional Four Treasures of the Study: brush, ink, paper, and inkstone, to write kanji and kana. Several different styles of Japanese calligraphy exist, with considerable effort put into the outcome; in some cases, it can take over one hundred attempts to produce the desired result of a single character. This form of calligraphy is known as shodō (書道), literally meaning 'the way of writing or calligraphy', or more commonly, shūji (習字), 'learning how to write characters'. Commonly confused with calligraphy is the art form of sumi-e (墨絵), literally meaning 'ink painting', which is the art of painting a scene or object using diluted black ink. Japanese terminology distinguishes shodō (書道) from shūji (習字) and shosha (書写). Shodō presents calligraphy as a cultivated artistic path within Japanese aesthetics and the broader culture of dō arts, while shūji and shosha usually refer to school instruction in handwriting, character formation, and brush practice.

Painting has been an art in Japan for a very long time: the brush is a traditional writing and painting tool, and the extension of that to its use as an artist's tool was probably natural. Japanese painters are often categorized by what they painted, as most of them constrained themselves solely to subjects such as animals, landscapes, or figures. Chinese papermaking was introduced to Japan around the 7th century. Later, washi was developed from it. Native Japanese painting techniques are still in use today, as well as techniques adopted from continental Asia and from the West. Schools of painting such as the Kano school of the 16th century became known for their bold brush strokes and contrast between light and dark, especially after Oda Nobunaga and Tokugawa Ieyasu began to use this style. Famous Japanese painters include Kanō Sanraku, Maruyama Ōkyo, and Tani Bunchō.

Ukiyo-e, literally means 'pictures of the floating world', is a genre of woodblock prints that exemplifies the characteristics of pre-Meiji Japanese art. Because these prints could be mass-produced, they were available to a wide cross-section of the Japanese populace – those not wealthy enough to afford original paintings – during their heyday, from the 17th to 20th century.

Japanese lacquerware and ceramics have historically gained international fame, and lacquerware has been actively exported since the Muromachi period and ceramics since the Edo period. Japanese crafts became known in Europe after the Nanban trade and inspired the enconchado technique of inlaid art in colonial Mexico.

Ikebana is the Japanese art of flower arrangement. It has gained widespread international fame for its focus on harmony, color use, rhythm, and elegantly simple design. It is an art centered greatly on expressing the seasons and is meant to act as a symbol to something greater than the flower itself.

== Traditional clothing ==
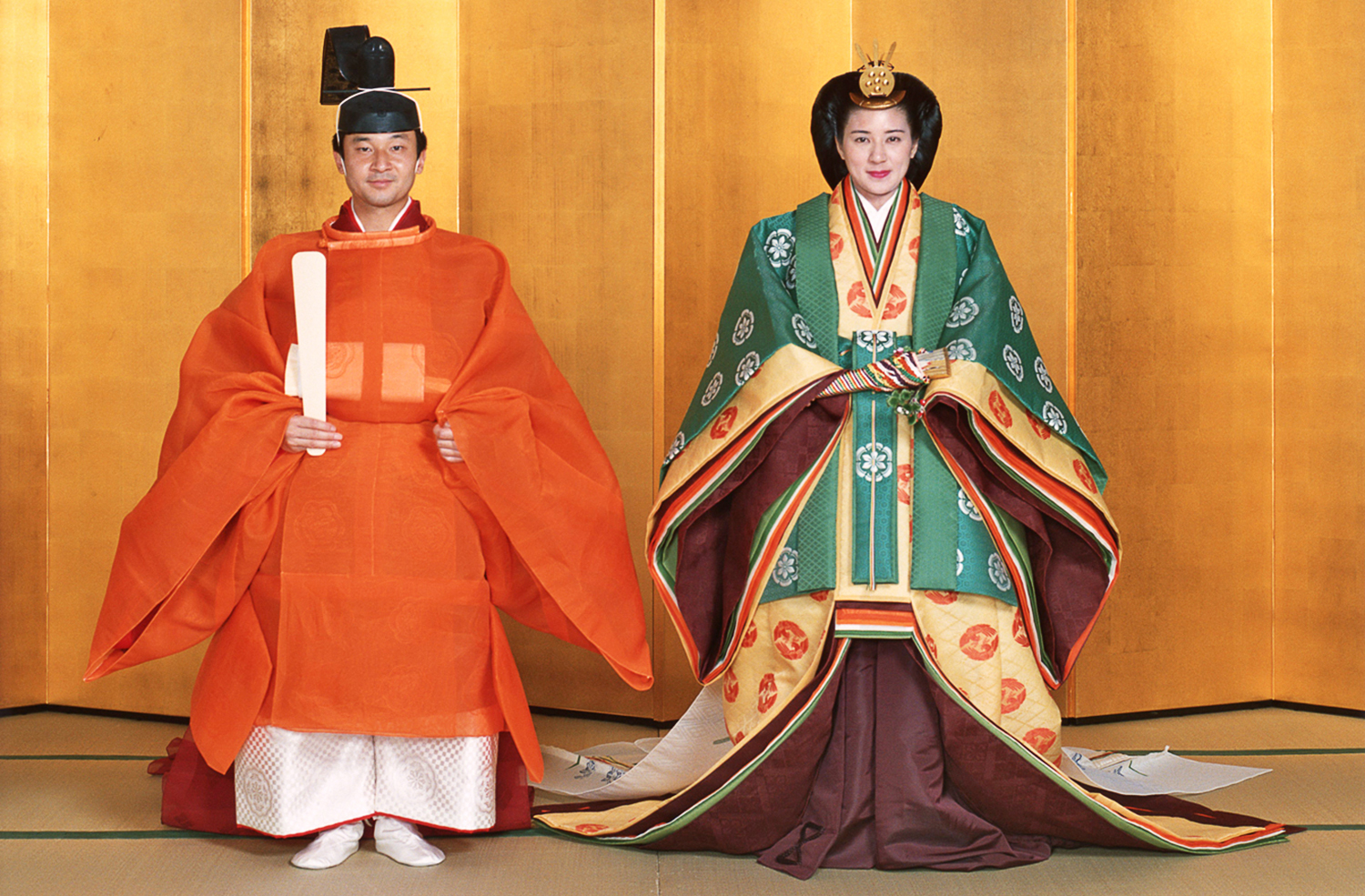
Newly-wed Emperor Naruhito, then Crown Prince, wearing a sokutai and Empress Masako, then-Crown Princess, wearing a jūnihitoe. Costumes of these styles have been worn by the Imperial family since the Heian period, when a unique Japanese style developed.

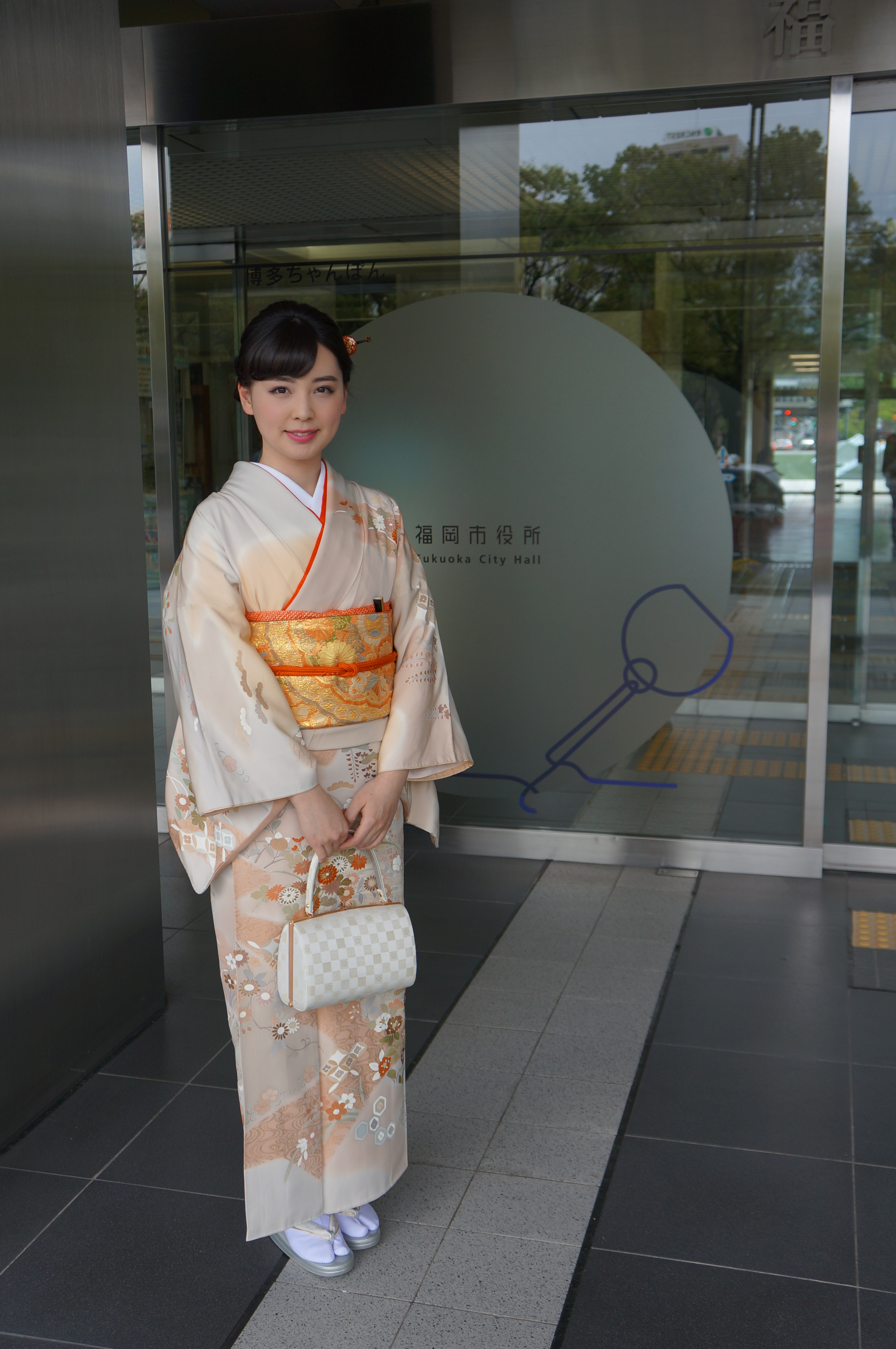
Woman in kimono at Fukuoka City Hall

The kimono is the national garment of Japan, having developed from Chinese court clothing in the Nara period following the exchange of diplomatic envoys between the two countries at that time. The word kimono translates literally as 'thing to wear on the shoulders'; however, this term developed some time around the Edo period, before which most kimono-like garments were referred to as the kosode ('short sleeve'), with longer-sleeved garments being known as furisode ('swinging sleeve').

The earliest versions of the kimono were heavily influenced by traditional Chinese clothing, known today as hanfu (kanfuku (漢服) in Japanese). This influence was spread through Japanese envoy missions to China, resulting in extensive Chinese cultural adoption by Japan as early as the 5th century CE. It was during the 8th century, however, that Chinese fashions came fully into style, and following the cancellation of the 20th mission to Tang dynasty China, these fashions developed independently, with the overlapping, V-shaped collar becoming women's fashion and the precursor to the modern kimono.

Kimono, alongside all other items of traditional Japanese clothing, are known collectively as wafuku, meaning 'Japanese clothing', as opposed to yōfuku, Western-style clothing. Kimono come in a variety of colors, styles, and sizes. Men mainly wear darker or more muted colors, while women tend to wear brighter colors and pastels, and, especially for younger women, often with complicated abstract or floral patterns.

In previous decades, married women wore short sleeved kimono, whereas unmarried women wore long sleeved kimono to both formal and informal occasions; however, the rise in both the average age of marriage and the numbers of women never marrying in Japan has led to the divide between sleeve length becoming one more of age, with most women in their early twenties wearing long sleeved kimono only to formal occasions, and most women past their early twenties wearing short sleeved kimono to formal events, regardless of marriage status. Other developments include the abandoning of layered kimono and the standardisation of the length of short sleeved women's kimono to a range of roughly 49–52 centimetres (19–20 in) in length, both developments driven by fabric shortages in WWII.

The happi coat is another form of traditional clothing. A happi (commonly Anglicised as "happy") coat is a straight sleeved coat typically decorated with a family crest and/or kanji along the collar. In previous centuries, happi-style coats known as hikeshi sashiko banten or simply hikeshi banten were commonly worn by firefighters; the coats would be constructed from several layers of heavy cotton stitched together, and would be soaked in water to provide protection from fire.

Alongside traditional clothing, Japan also has distinct footwear; tabi, ankle-length split-toed socks, are commonly worn with the kimono, and are designed to be worn with traditional shoes such as geta and zōri. Geta are thonged sandals mounted on wooden blocks extending from the base of the shoe to the floor, and are worn by men and women with kimono or yukata; zōri are flat-based or sloping sandals made of a number of different materials, and are considered to be more formal than geta.

Fashion trends and consumer apathy have hurt the Japanese kimono industry. Kimono sales and traditional tailors suffered after WWII due to Western fashion. Innovative and diverse kimono makers have revived the declining industry. Internationally, the industry has tried casual styles. The Boston Museum of Fine Arts' "Kimono Wednesdays" led to cultural appropriation debates. Asian-American protesters cited Orientalism, racism, and cultural appropriation. Protests sparked global cultural debate and appropriation. The protests lacked Japanese and Japanese-American representation, say critics. Scholars say Edward Said's "Orientalism" may not always apply.

Cultural appropriation could harm kimono exhibitions. War can hinder cultural exchange and Japanese fashion abroad. Japanese mainstream media and cultural commentators rarely mention it. Cultural appropriation may lead to kimono experimentation, say Japanese commentators. Cultural appropriation and Japanese fashion remain hot topics. Globally, the industry must balance cultural integrity and innovation.

== Installation arts ==
Japanese architecture was originally heavily influenced by Chinese architecture and later developed many unique aspects indigenous to Japan. Examples of traditional architecture are seen at temples, Shinto shrines, and castles in Kyoto and Nara. Some of these buildings are constructed with traditional gardens, which are influenced by Zen ideas. Some modern architects, such as Yoshio Taniguchi and Tadao Ando are known for their amalgamation of Japanese traditional and Western architectural influences.

Traditional Japanese garden architecture is considered to hold the same importance as traditional building architecture, and both are influenced by similar historical and religious backgrounds. A primary design principle of a traditional garden is the creation of the landscape based on, or at least greatly influenced by, the style of three-dimensional monochrome ink (sumi) landscape painting known as sumi-e or suibokuga; as such, garden landscaping is elevated to the status of an artform in Japan.

Traditional Japanese sculptures mainly focused on Buddhist images, such as Tathagata, Bodhisattva, and Myō-ō. The oldest sculpture in Japan is a wooden statue of Amitābha at the Zenkō-ji temple. In the Nara period, Buddhist statues were made by the national government to boost its prestige. These examples are seen in present-day Nara and Kyoto, most notably a colossal bronze statue of the Buddha Vairocana in the Tōdai-ji temple.

Wood has traditionally been used as the chief material in Japan, along with traditional Japanese architecture. Statues are often lacquered, gilded, or brightly painted, although there are commonly few traces of this on the surface. Bronze and other metals are generally not used. Other materials, such as stone and pottery, have had extremely important roles in traditional sculpture.

Installation arts

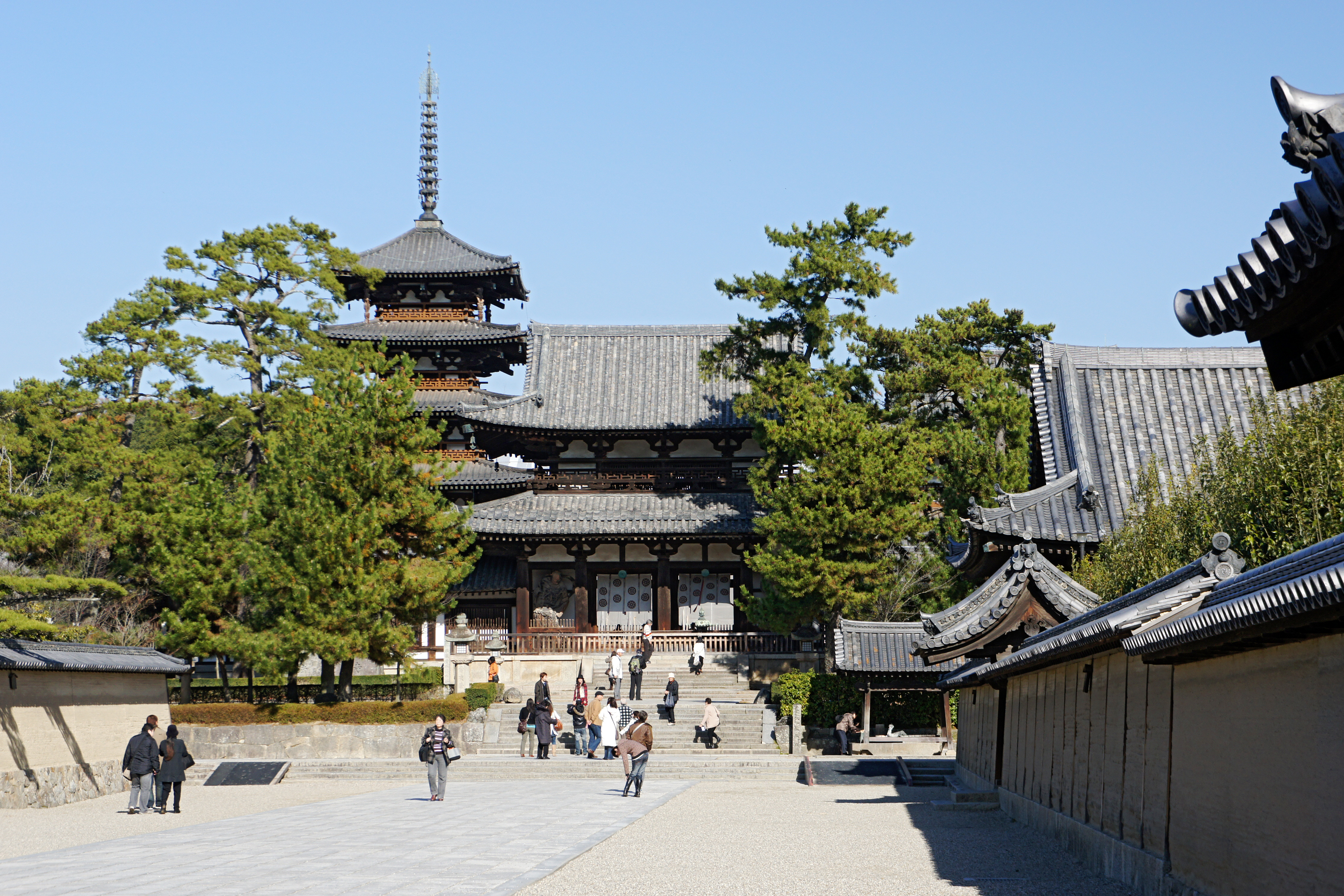
Hōryū-ji is widely known to be the oldest wooden architecture existing in the world.

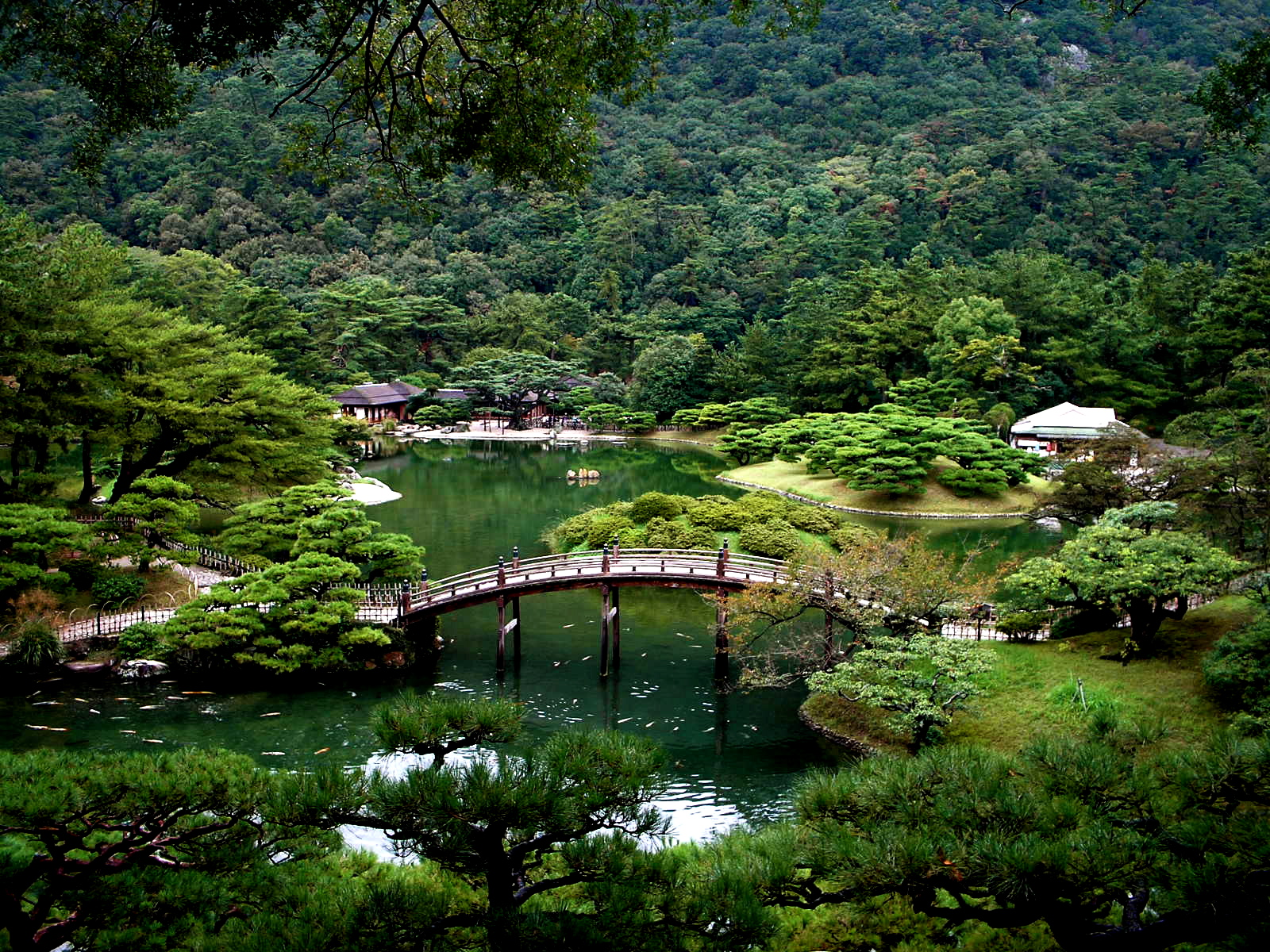
Ritsurin Garden

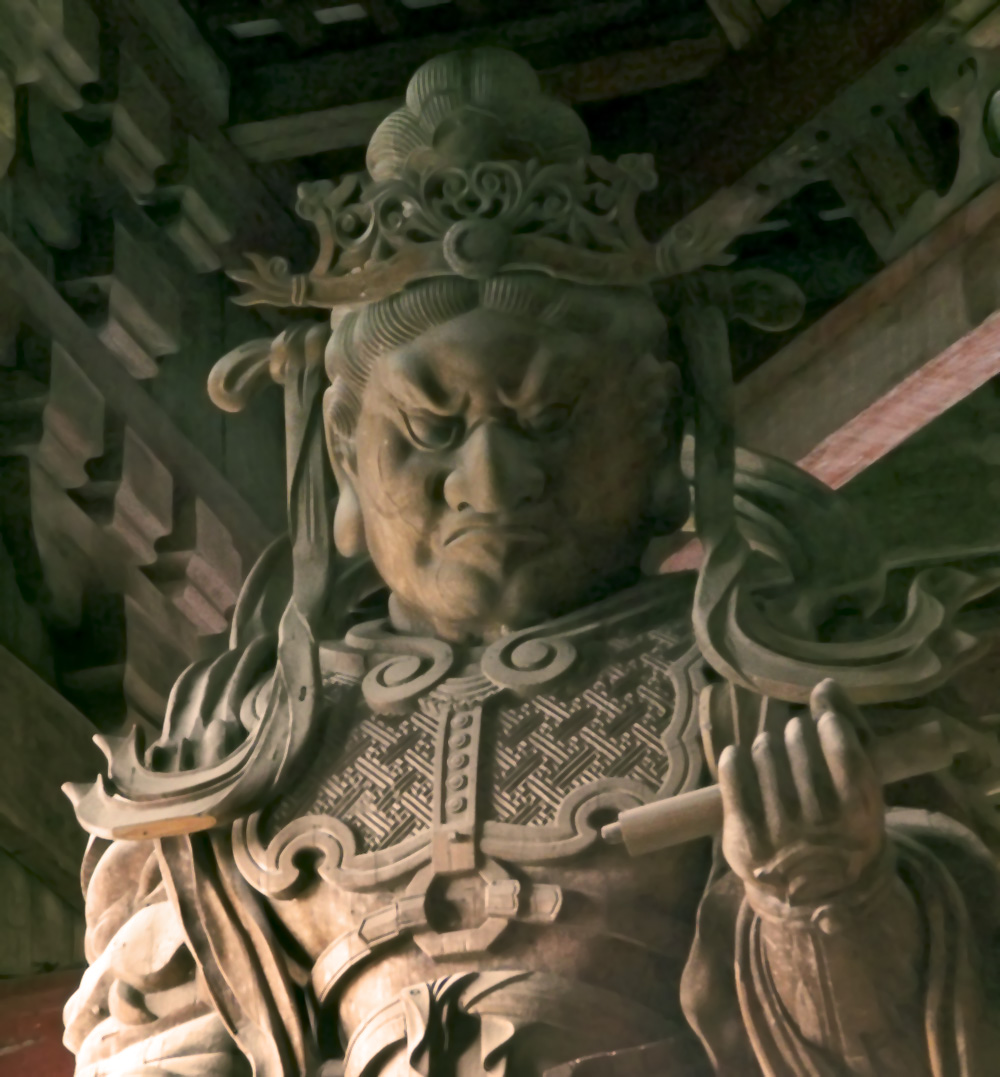
Guardian in Tōdai-ji, Nara

== Music ==
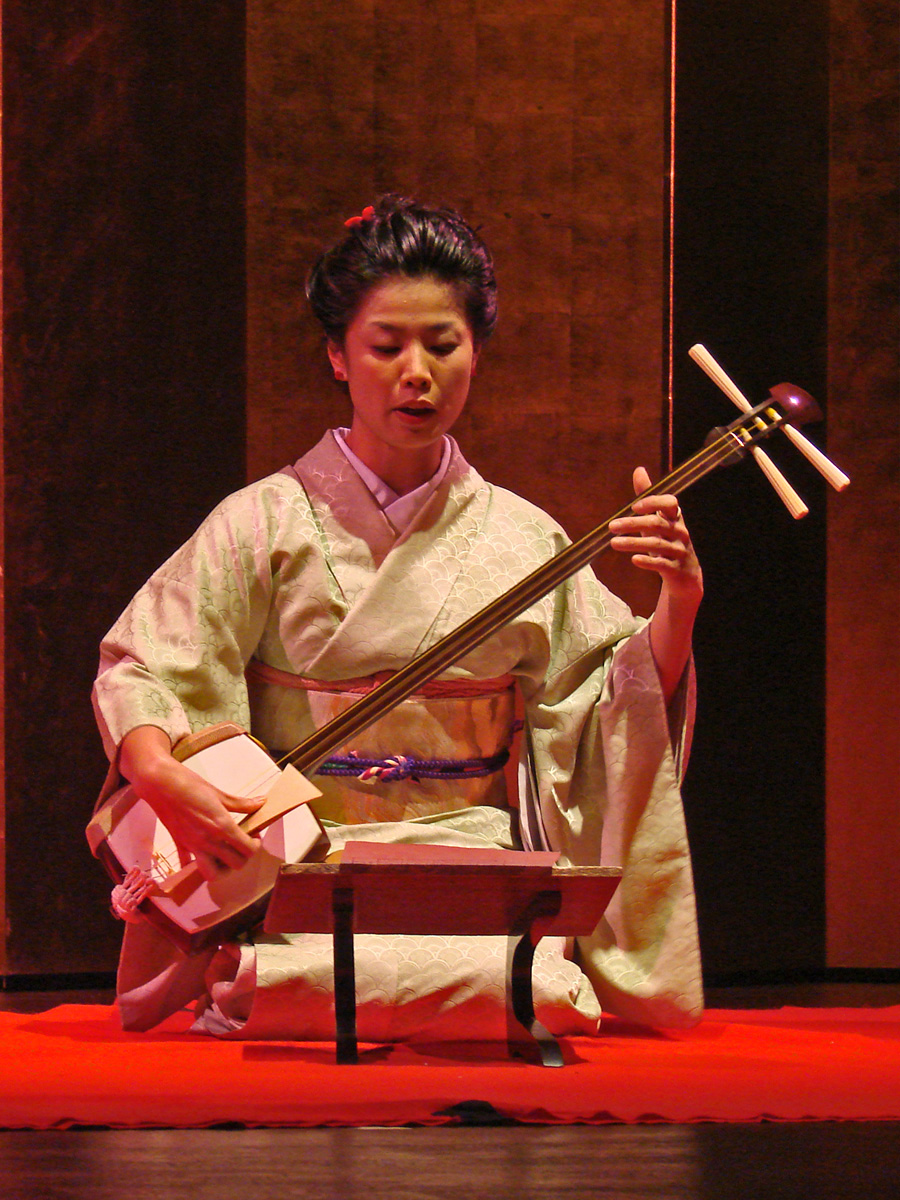
Fumie Hihara playing the shamisen, Guimet Museum, Paris

The music of Japan includes a wide array of styles both distinctly traditional and modern. Traditional Japanese music is quite different from Western music and is based on the intervals of human breathing rather than mathematical timing; traditional music also typically slides between notes, a feature also not commonly found in Western music. The word for music in Japanese is ongaku (音楽), combining the kanji on (音, "sound") with the kanji gaku (楽, "enjoyment"). Major aesthetic concepts are jo-ha-kyū and ma. Jo-ha-kyū (序破急) roughly translates to "beginning, break, rapid", it essentially means that all actions or efforts should begin slowly, speed up, and then end swiftly. Ma literally means a space or interval between two points (in space or time). In music, it refers to rhythm. In nagauta (長唄, literally "long song") (played on the shamisen and used in kabuki theater), uki-ma implies a slight lengthening of the first of a pair of beats, while tsume-ma implies the reverse. It is this meaning of timing that is seen as a unique aesthetic to explain otherwise inexplicable aspects of Japanese performing arts. Japanese music stresses sound quality and prizes the richness and complexity of each instrument's sound spectrum. Noise is also used in a highly formalized manner to imitate "nature" and the expressive energy and artistic potential of noise are accepted and incorporated.

=== History of traditional music ===
Traditional Japanese music finds its first major historic periods in the Nara (710–794) and Heian (794–1185) periods. The two most common kinds of music during this time were the music of the court (Gagaku) and the music of Buddhist rituals (shōmyō). The music of the Nara period can be classified as belonging to the first international period in Japanese music history. The court music was all of Chinese, Korean, or Indian origin and was played primarily by foreign musicians in its original style. Gagaku classical music has been performed at the Imperial court since the Heian period. At the same time, Buddhist ritual music exerted some influence on the native vocal style. While poetry anthologies indicate that folk music had continued its steady pace, the historical records and relics show us music that was primarily instrumental and often connected with dance. By the time of the Kamakura period, most traces of the international character of Japanese music had disappeared. Court music in general was declining, while there was a steady growth of more theatrical arts. The indigenous folk ritual music of flute and drums here encountered the aristocratic aesthetic of poetry and literary tales. Japan's indigenous musical culture can still be found in much of folk music and the music of Shinto festivals in local communities.

=== Traditional instruments ===
Several traditional instruments were adopted and assimilated into Japanese culture from various sources. They were further experimented with and developed by Japan. One of the imported end-blown bamboo flutes from China developed into the shakuhachi, which became the ritual instrument of the Fuke sect of Zen monks. By the middle of the eighteenth century, in secular performances, the shamisen lute and koto, invented in China and brought to Japan during the Nara Period, 13-string zither as used for genteel entertainment and professionally controlled by blind musicians who had the rights to heike narrative. The shamisen, modified from the Chinese sanxian introduced via the Ryukyu Islands in the late sixteenth century, came into its own in the theatrical contexts of bunraku puppet drama and kabuki drama.

=== Modern music ===
Japan is the second largest music market in the world behind the United States, and is the largest in Asia, with most of the market dominated by Japanese artists. Local music often appears at karaoke venues on lease from record labels.

Western music has been adopted and adapted to the Japanese context and has often in the process become Japanized (domesticated) and different from its model. Hybrid music has resulted, such as enka, J-pop, and 'contemporary Japanese music' (gendai hōgaku) or 'new Japanese music' (shin-hōgaku). Famous enka singers include Hibari Misora, Saburo Kitajima, Ikuzo Yoshi, and Haruo Minami. One notable contemporary influence on Japanese musical music came from Ainu music and the so-called nationalist composer Ifukube Akiraa (b. 1914 in Hokkaido) who brought the tonkori zither onto the World Music scene.

In the late 20th century Japanese music rose in popularity with Aidoru (Japanese Idols) with popular audition shows such as the Suta¯tanjo¯(A Star Is Born). Japanese music further evolved in the jazz, pop, R&B, and Rock music genres and continues into today. Popular artists of the 20th-21st centuries include Ado, Yoko Ono, Suzuka Nakamoto, Koji Tamaki, Hideto Takarai, Takahiro Moriuchi, Kenshi Yonezu, and Haruomi Hosono. Popular groups of the same eras include The Oral Cigarettes, Yoasobi, Bump of Chicken, King Gnu, Mrs. Green Apple, Fishmans, and Perfume., another popular form of music from Japan is Vocaloid music, popular vocaloids include Hatsune Miku, Kagamine Rin/Len, Kasane Teto, these were made popular in the early 2000s and late 2010s, with popular events in Japan including Magical Mirai, and Miku Expo, this type of music is also popular in Western culture,

== Performing arts ==
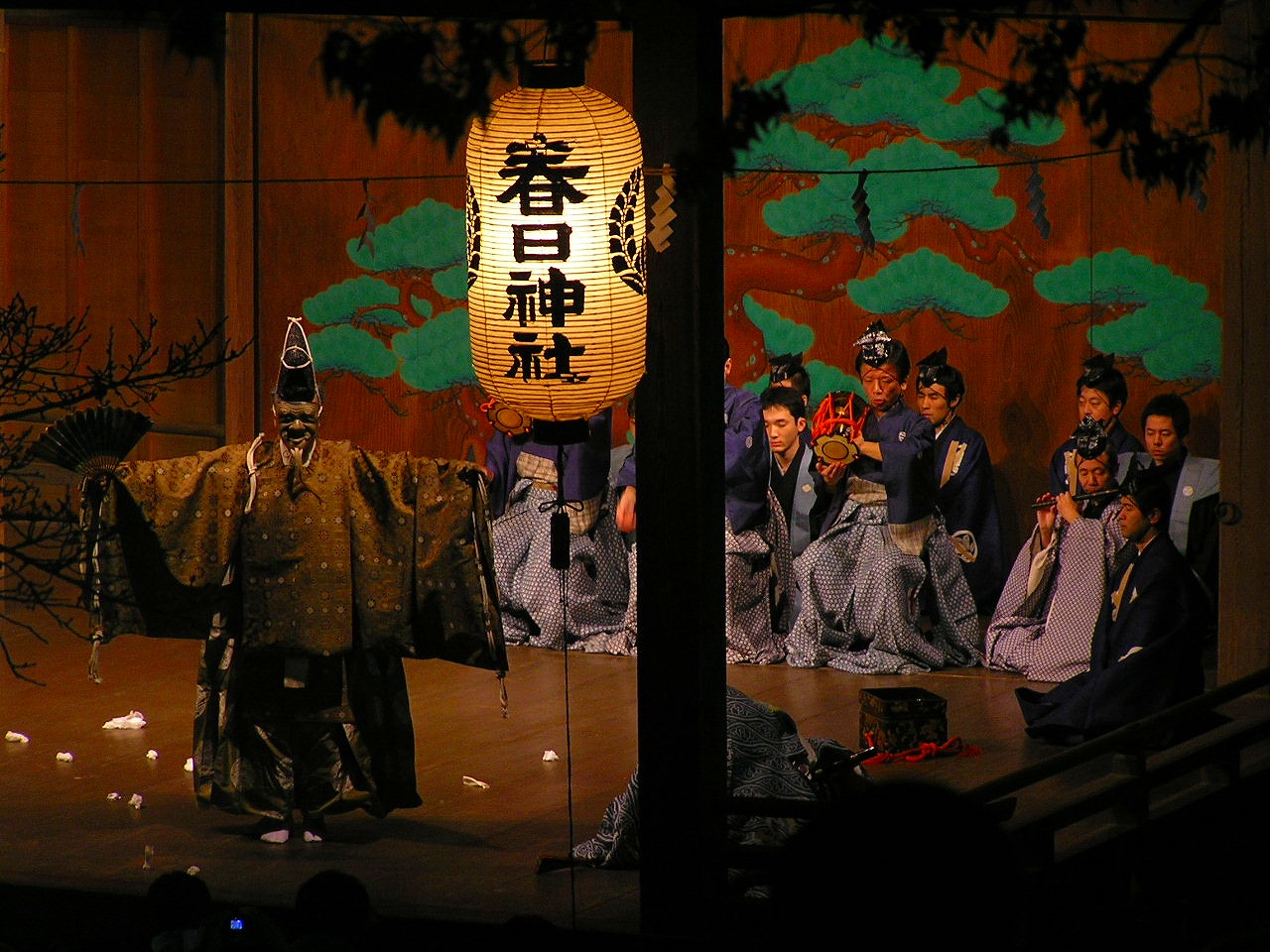
Noh play at traditional Noh theatre

The four traditional theatres from Japan are noh (or nō), kyōgen, kabuki, and bunraku. Noh had its origins in the union of the sarugaku, with music and dance made by Kan'ami and Zeami Motokiyo. Among the characteristic aspects of it are the masks, costumes, and the stylized gestures, sometimes accompanied by a fan that can represent other objects. The Noh programs are presented in alternation with the ones of kyōgen, traditionally in numbers of five, but currently in groups of three.

The kyōgen, of a humorous character, had an older origin, in 8th century entertainment brought from China, developing itself in sarugaku. In kyōgen, masks are rarely used and even if the plays can be associated with the ones of noh, currently many are not.

Kabuki appears in the beginning of the Edo period from the representations and dances of Izumo no Okuni in Kyoto. Due to concerns over the number of actresses engaged in selling sex, the participation of women in the plays was forbidden by the government in 1629, and the feminine characters had passed to be represented only by men (onnagata). Recent attempts to reintroduce actresses in kabuki had not been well accepted. Another characteristic of kabuki is the use of makeup for the actors in historical plays (kumadori) and the performance of nagauta ballads.

Japanese puppet theater (bunraku) developed in the same period as kabuki, in both competition with and collaboration with its actors and authors. The origin of bunraku, however, is older, beginning in the Heian period. In 1914, the Takarazuka Revue was founded, a company solely composed by women who introduced the revue to Japan.

== Sports and leisure ==
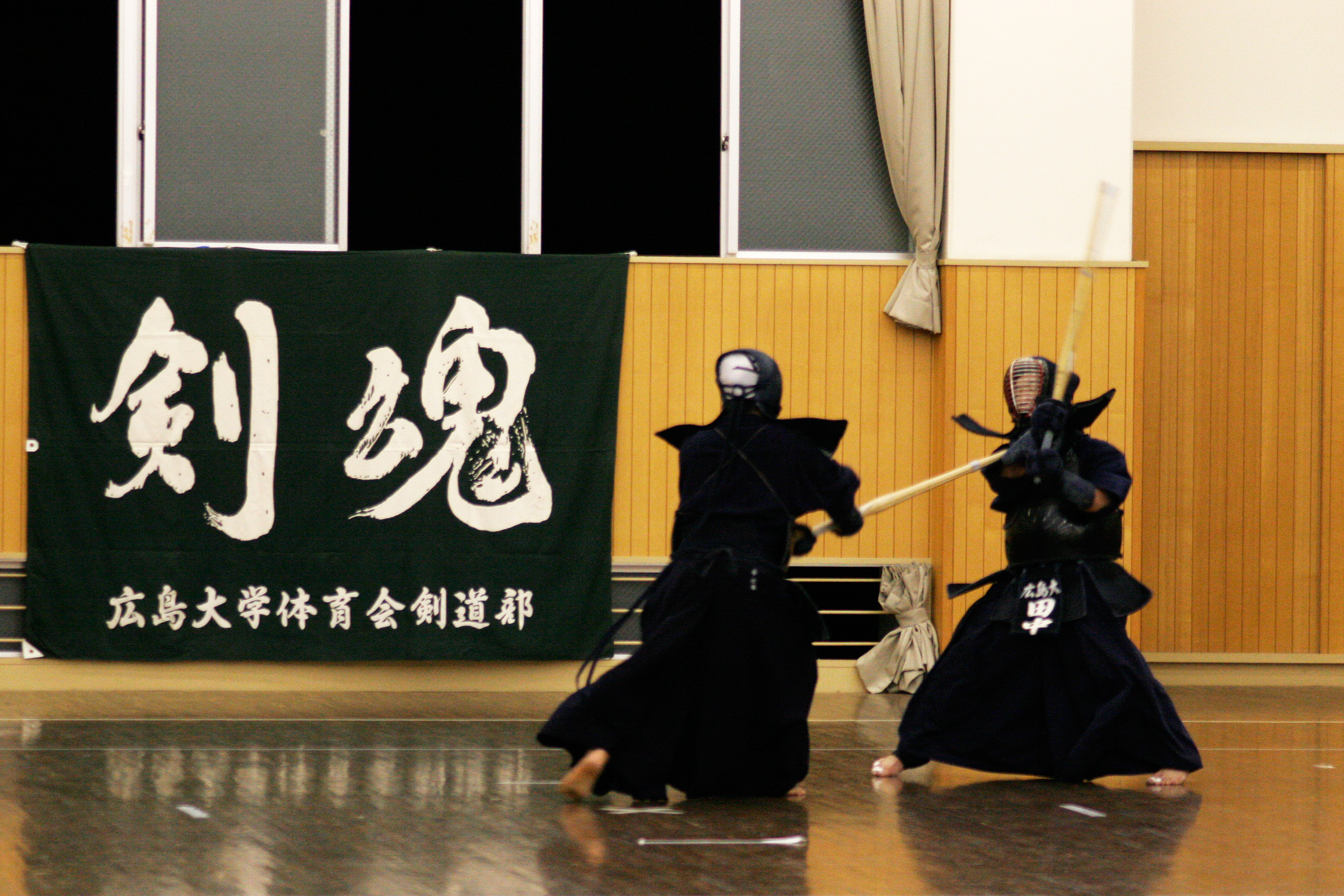
Two students practicing kendo at Hiroshima University

In the long feudal period governed by the samurai class, some methods that were used to train warriors were developed into well-ordered martial arts, in modern times referred to collectively as koryū. Examples include kenjutsu, kendo, kyūdō, sōjutsu, jujutsu, and sumo, all of which were established in the Edo period. After the rapid social change in the Meiji Restoration, some martial arts changed into modern sports, called gendai budō. Judo was developed by Kanō Jigorō, who studied some sects of jujutsu. These sports are still widely practiced in present-day Japan and other countries.

Baseball, association football, and other popular Western sports were imported to Japan in the Meiji period. These sports are commonly practiced in schools, along with traditional martial arts. Baseball, soccer, football, and ping pong are the most popular sports in Japan. Association football gained prominence in Japan after the J League (Japan Professional Football League) was established in 1991. Japan also co-hosted the 2002 FIFA World Cup with Korea. In addition, there are many semi-professional organizations, which are sponsored by private companies: for example, volleyball, basketball, rugby union, table tennis, and so on.

Japan has also hosted the Olympic Games in 1964, 1972, 1998, and 2020.

== Cuisine ==
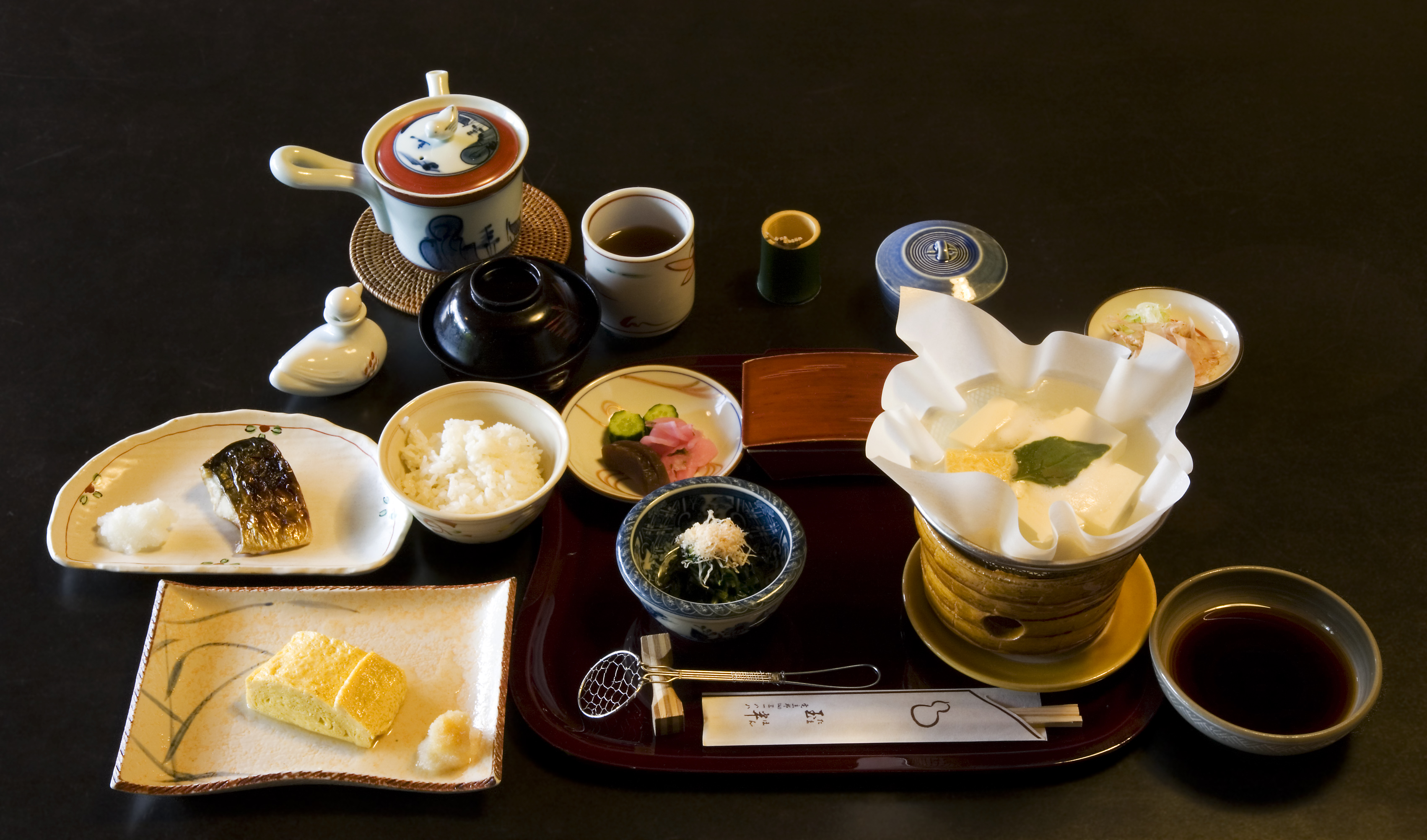
Traditional breakfast at a ryokan

Through a long culinary past, the Japanese have developed sophisticated and refined cuisine. In more recent years, Japanese food has become fashionable and popular in the United States, Europe, and many other areas. Dishes such as sushi, tempura, noodles, and teriyaki are some of the foods that are commonly known. The Japanese diet consists principally of rice; fresh, lean seafood; and pickled or boiled vegetables. The Japanese diet is often believed to be related to the longevity of Japanese people.

Despite the traditional cuisine (和食 washoku) being very important and present, western cuisine (洋食 yōshoku) has influenced Japanese eating culture tremendously.

== Popular culture ==
Japanese popular culture not only reflects the attitudes and concerns of the present day but also provides a link to the past. Popular films, television programs, manga, music, anime and video games all developed from older artistic and literary traditions, and many of their themes and styles of presentation can be traced to traditional art forms. Contemporary forms of popular culture, much like the traditional forms, provide not only entertainment but also an escape for the contemporary Japanese from the problems of an industrial world. Many anime and manga series are very popular around the world and continue to become popular, as well as Japanese video games, fashion, and game shows.

In the late 1980s, the family was the focus of leisure activities, such as excursions to parks or shopping districts. Although Japan is often thought of as a hard-working society with little time for leisure, the Japanese seek entertainment wherever they can. It is common to see Japanese commuters riding the train to work, enjoying their favorite manga, or listening through earphones to the latest in popular music. A wide variety of types of popular entertainment are available. There is a large selection of music, films, and the products of a huge manga and anime industry, among other forms of entertainment, from which to choose. Game centers, bowling alleys, and karaoke are popular hangout places for teens while older people may play shogi or go in specialized parlors. Together, the publishing, film/video, music/audio, and game industries in Japan make up the growing Japanese content industry.

As of 2023, Japan's overseas exports of cultural content recorded 5,776.9 billion yen.

== Cultural landscapes ==
There are 51 official cultural landscapes (文化的景観, bunkateki keikan) in Japan. These landscapes evolved with the way of life and geocultural features of a region, and which are indispensable for understanding the lifestyle of the Japanese people.

The Three Views of Japan (日本三景, Nihon Sankei) is the canonical list of Japan's three most celebrated scenic sights, attributed to 1643 scholar Hayashi Gahō. These are the pine-clad islands of Matsushima in Miyagi Prefecture, the pine-clad sandbar of Amanohashidate in Kyoto Prefecture, and Itsukushima Shrine in Hiroshima Prefecture. In 1915, the New Three Views of Japan were selected with a national election by the Jitsugyo no Nihon Sha (株式会社実業之日本社, Kabushiki Kaisha Jitsugyō no Nihon Sha). In 2003, the Three Major Night Views of Japan were selected by the New Three Major Night Views of Japan and the 100 Night Views of Japan Club (新日本三大夜景・夜景100選事務局).

Three Views of Japan

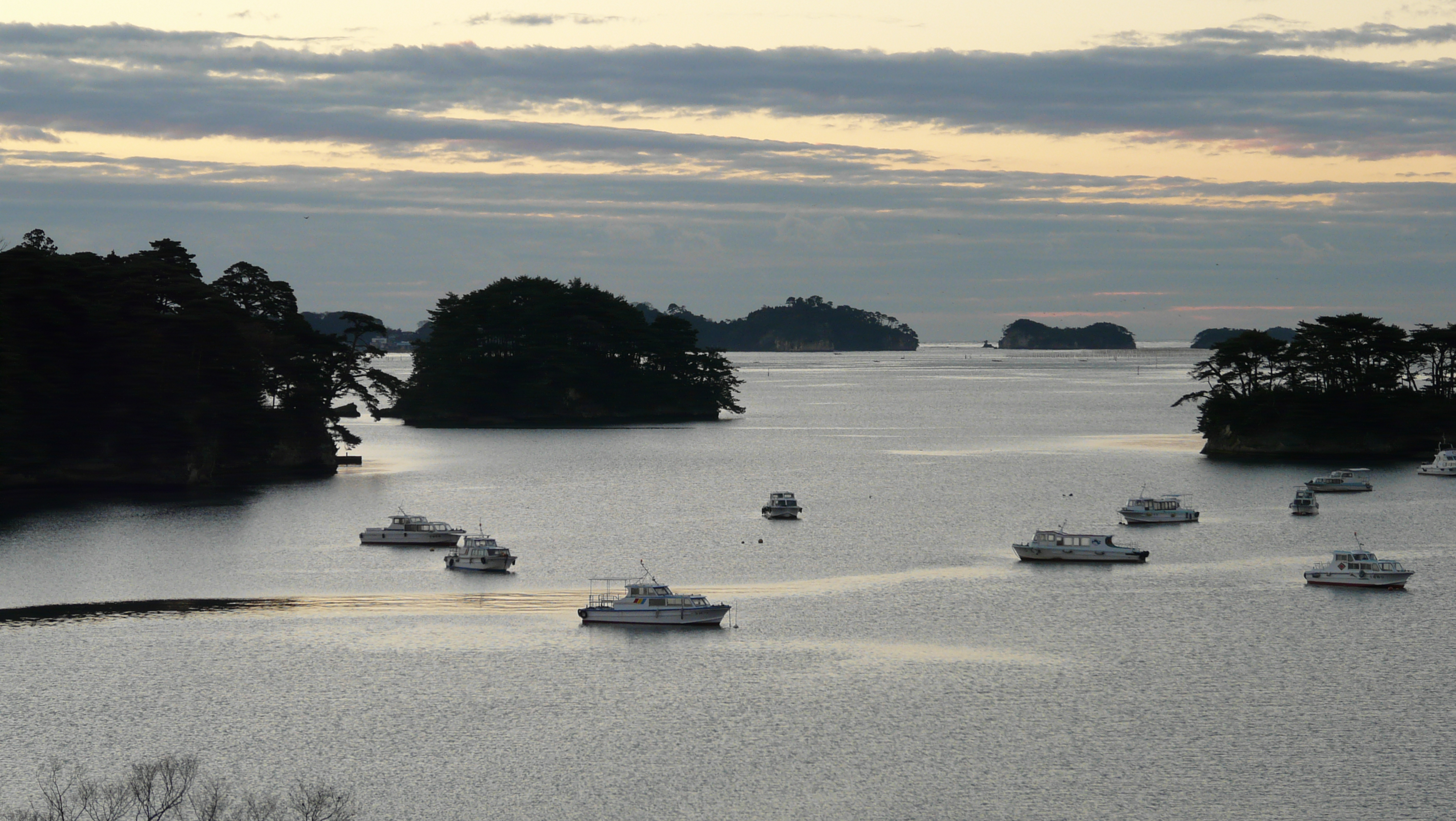
Pine-clad islands of Matsushima

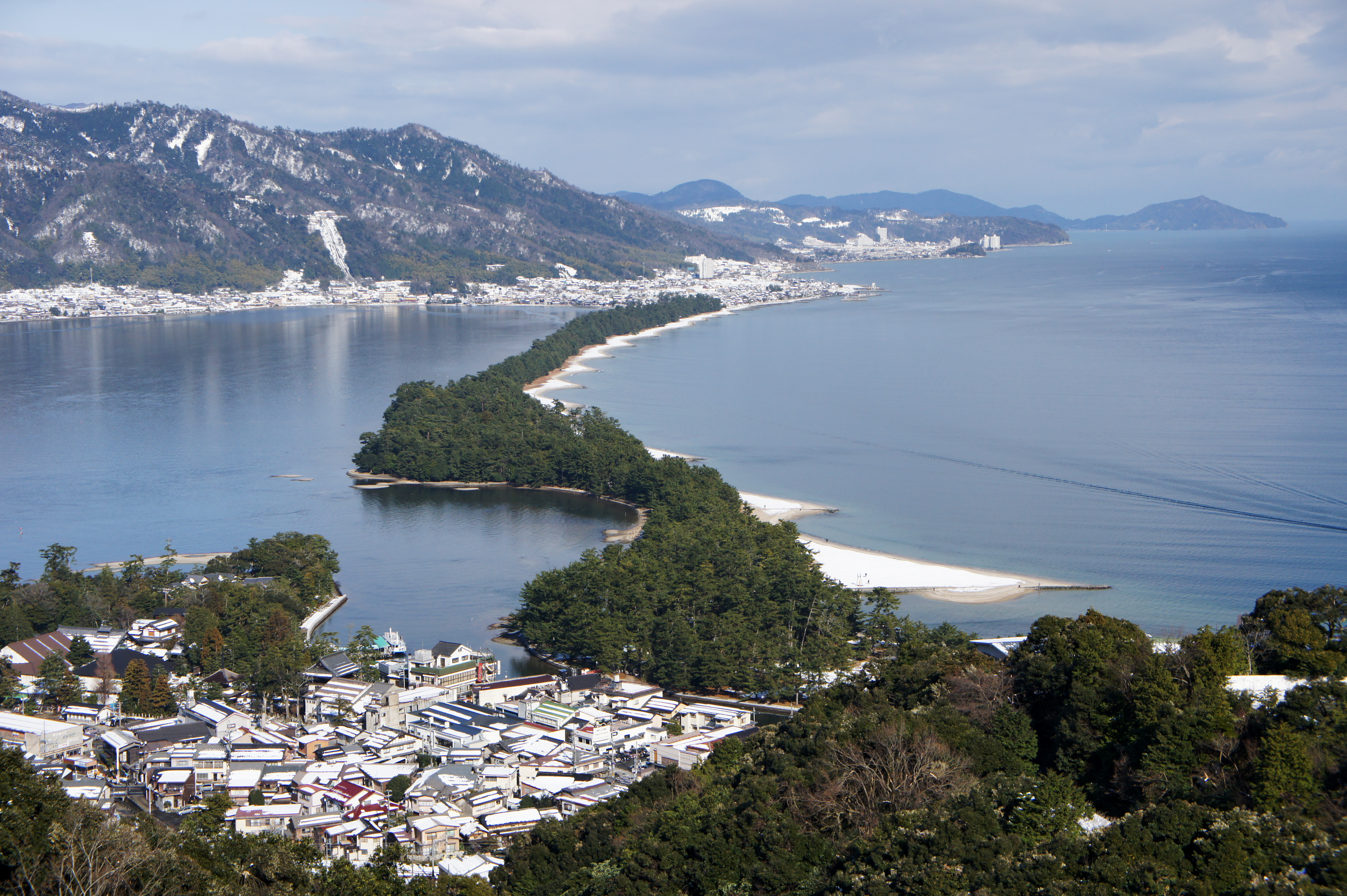
Sandbar of Amanohashidate

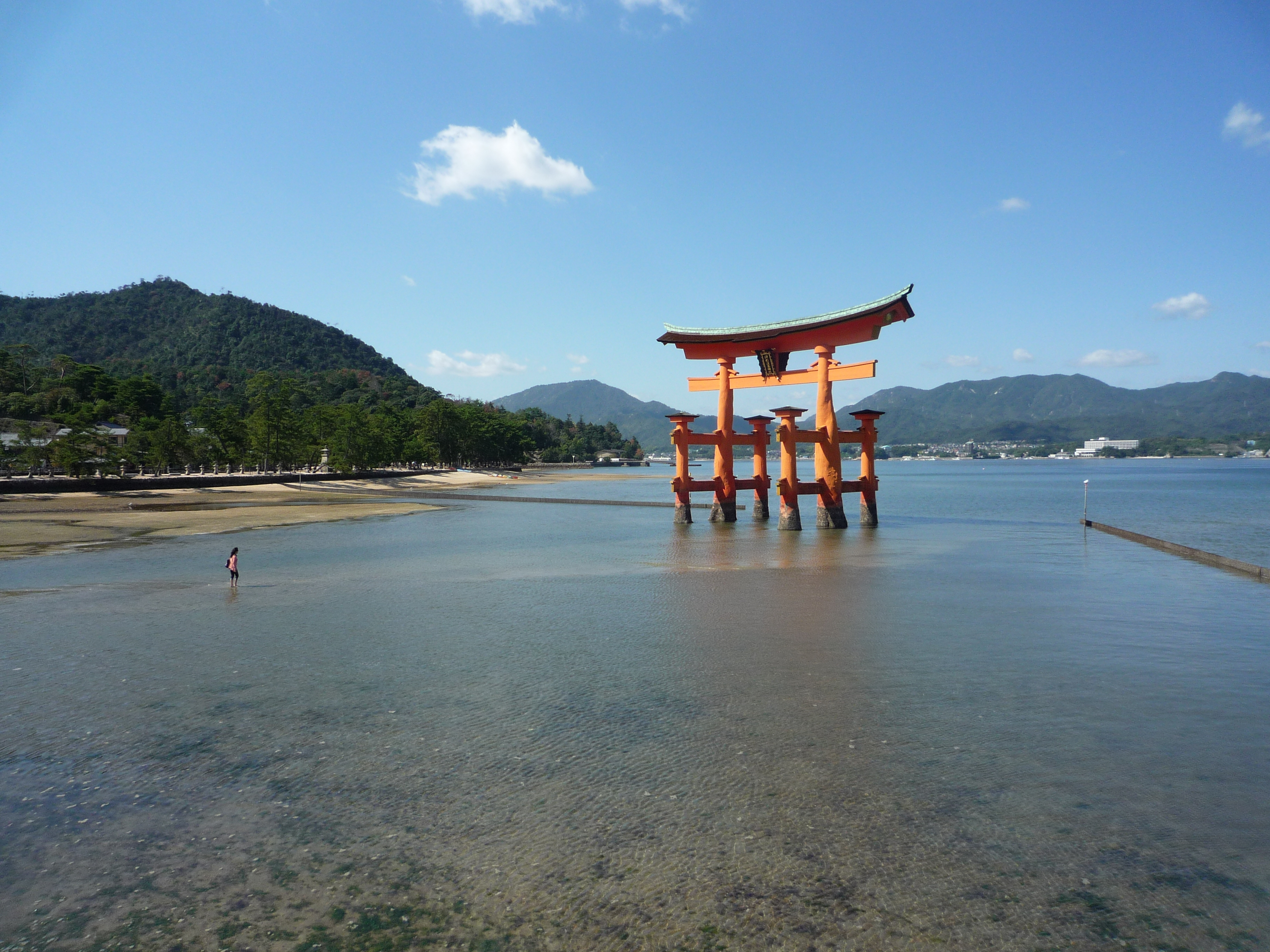
Torii at Itsukushima Shrine

== National symbols ==
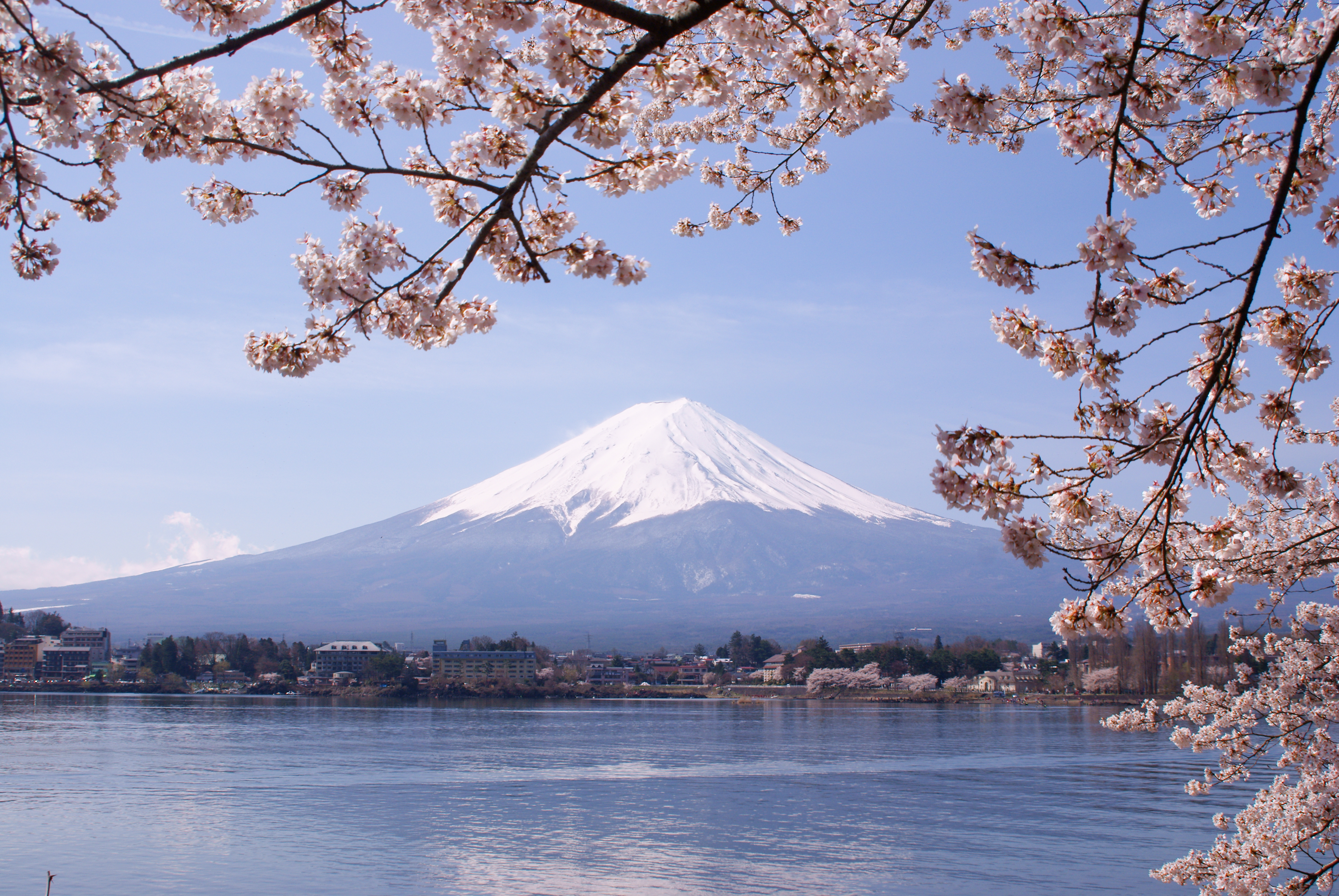
Mount Fuji and sakura (cherry blossoms) are national symbols of Japan

The Japanese archipelago is located to the east of the Asian continent. Japan is regarded as the most eastern Asian country, because east of Japan is the vast Pacific Ocean. Minamitorishima is Japan's easternmost island. Thus Japan is the land where the sun rises before the Asian continent. The kanji that make up the name of Japan literally mean 'sun origin' (日本). It is pronounced as 'Nihon' or 'Nippon' in Japanese, and is often referred to by the epithet "Land of the Rising Sun". The Nisshōki (日章旗, "sun-rise flag") is the national flag of Japan. It symbolizes the rising sun and corresponds with the name of Japan. The earliest accounts of the rising sun flag is in the 7th century CE. In 607, an official correspondence that began with "from the Emperor of the rising sun" was sent to Chinese Emperor Yang of Sui. Thus the central importance of the sun in Japanese culture is represented in the national flag and other cultural goods. Similarly, the Japan Self-Defense Forces have flags that symbolize the sun.

The Sun also plays an important role in Japanese mythology and religion as the emperor is said to be the direct descendant of the Sun goddess Amaterasu, the personification of Japan. She is seen as the goddess of the Sun and the universe in Shinto religion. The emperor is "the symbol of the State and of the unity of the people." Emperor Jimmu (神武天皇, Jinmu-tennō) is the national founder of Japan.

The national animals are the green pheasant, koi fish and the great purple emperor butterfly. The Imperial Seal of Japan is one of the national seals and a crest (mon) used by the Emperor of Japan and members of the Imperial Family. The cherry blossom (Prunus serrulata) & chrysanthemum morifolium are de facto national flowers of Japan. Japan's de facto national dish is sushi, Japanese curry and ramen. The de facto national liquor is sake.

Mount Fuji (富士山, Fujisan) is the national mountain of Japan. It is one of Japan's "Three Holy Mountains" (三霊山, Sanreizan) along with Mount Tate and Mount Haku. It is also a Special Place of Scenic Beauty and one of Japan's Historic Sites. The summit is considered a sacred place since ancient times. As a national symbol of the country, Mount Fuji has been depicted in various art and media such as painting, woodblock prints (such as the Thirty-six Views of Mount Fuji), poetry, music, theater, film, manga, anime and pottery.

== Gallery ==
Left panel of the Shōrin-zu byōbu, by Hasegawa Tohaku, c. 1595, six-fold screen, ink on paper, National Treasure

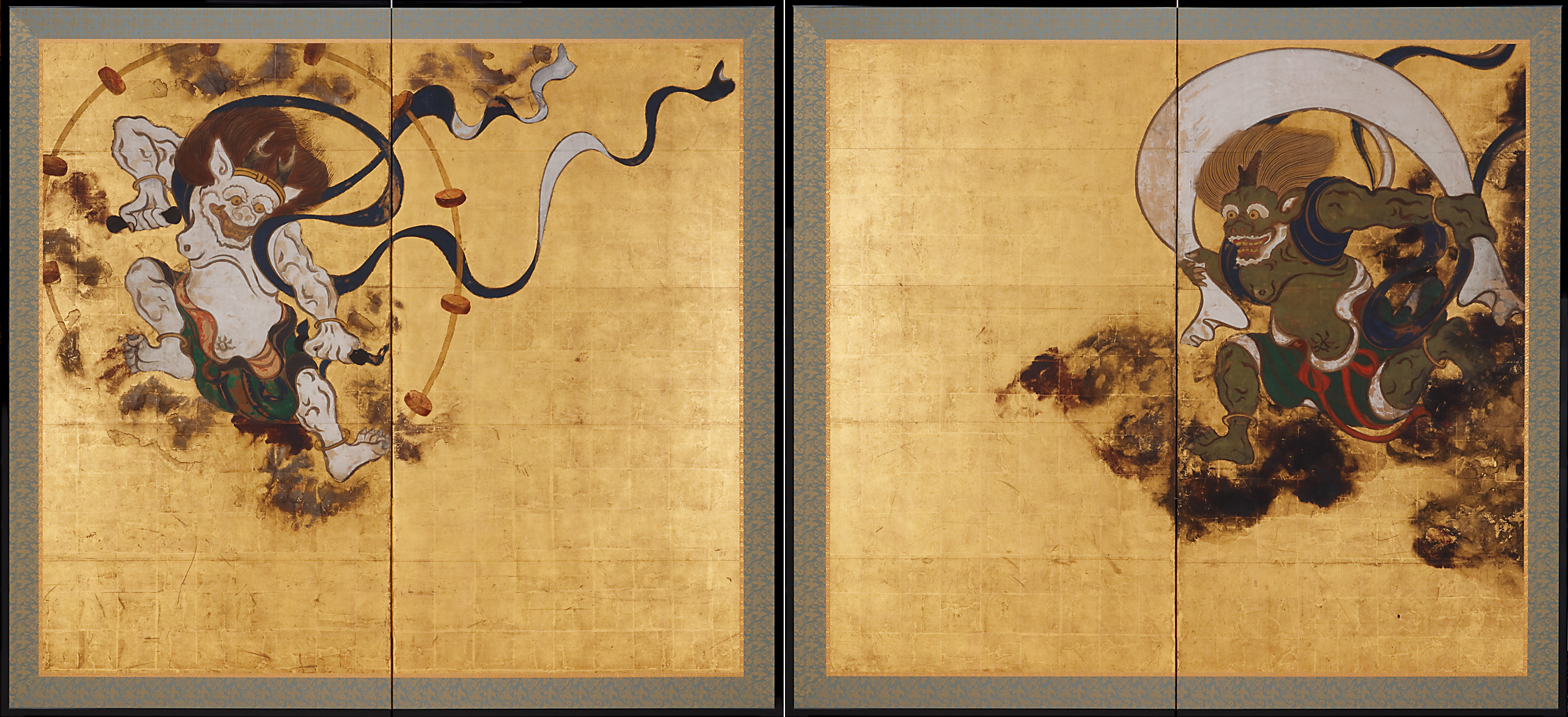
Fūjin-raijin-zu by Tawaraya Sōtatsu, with Raijin shown on the left and Fūjin right, 17th century

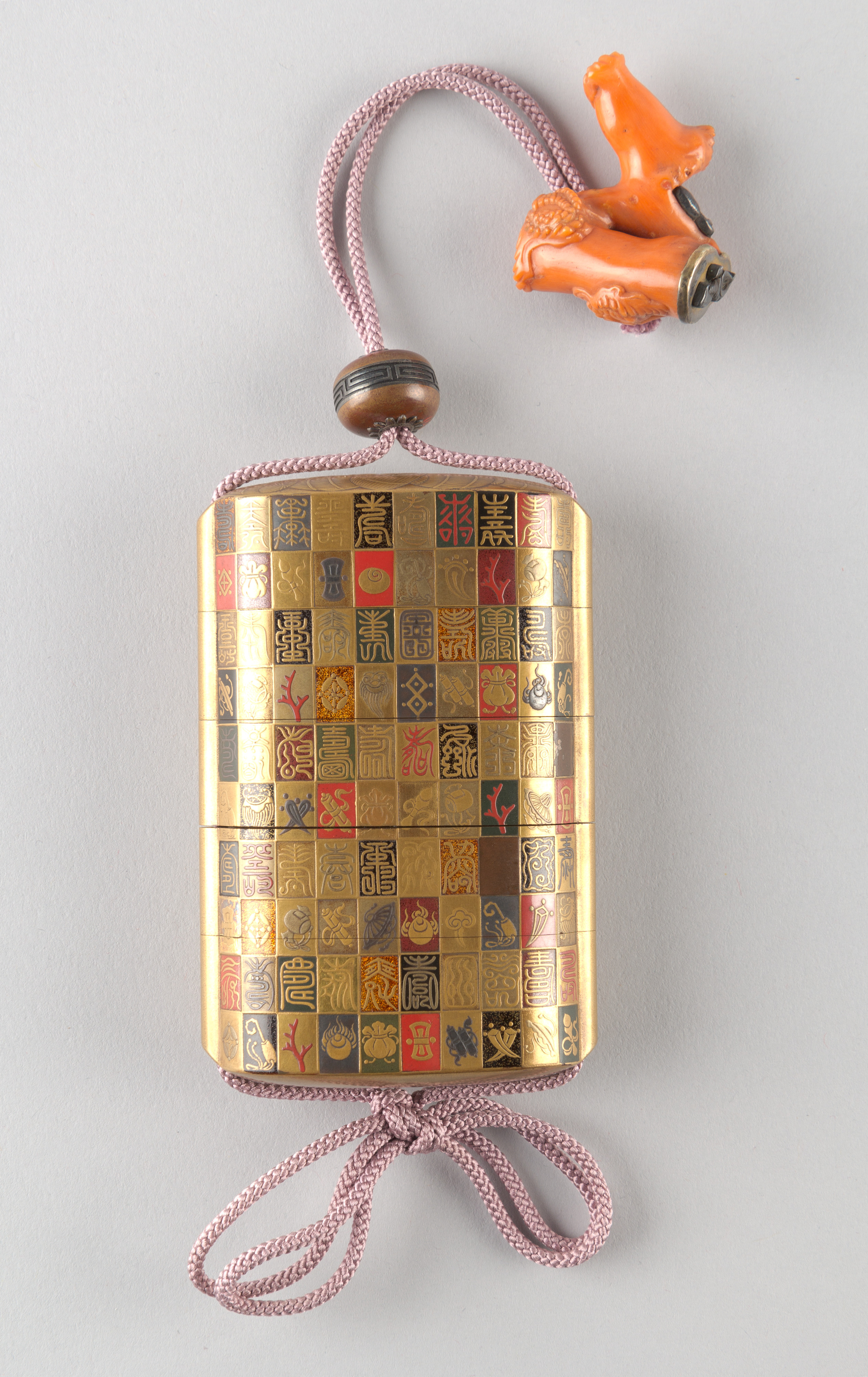
Inro in maki-e lacquerware

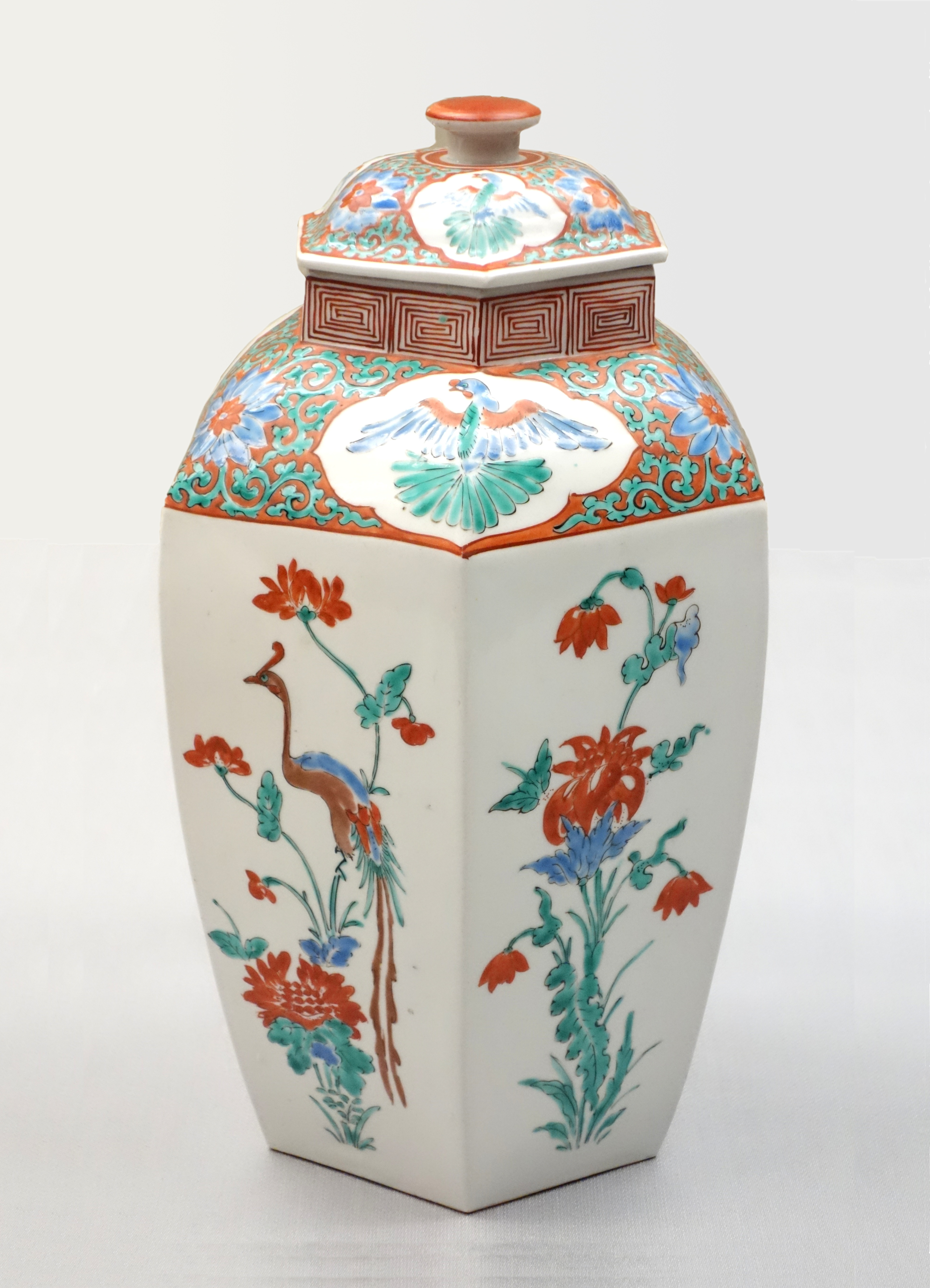
Kakiemon Imari ware hexagonal jar, flowering plant and phoenix design in overglaze enamel

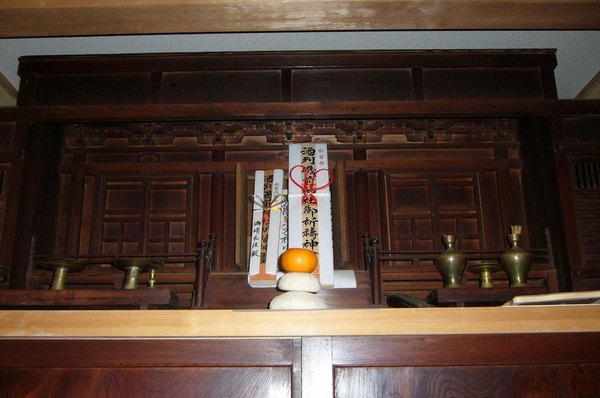
Kamidana (home shrine) with kagamimochi and ofuda

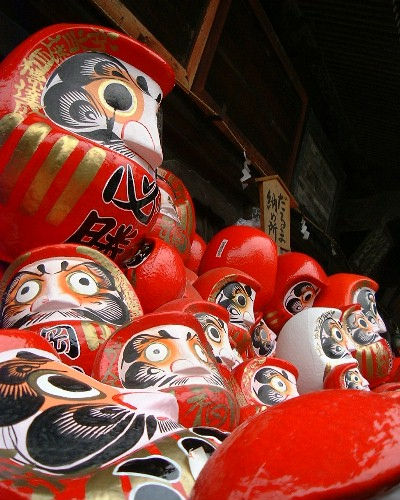
Daruma of various sizes

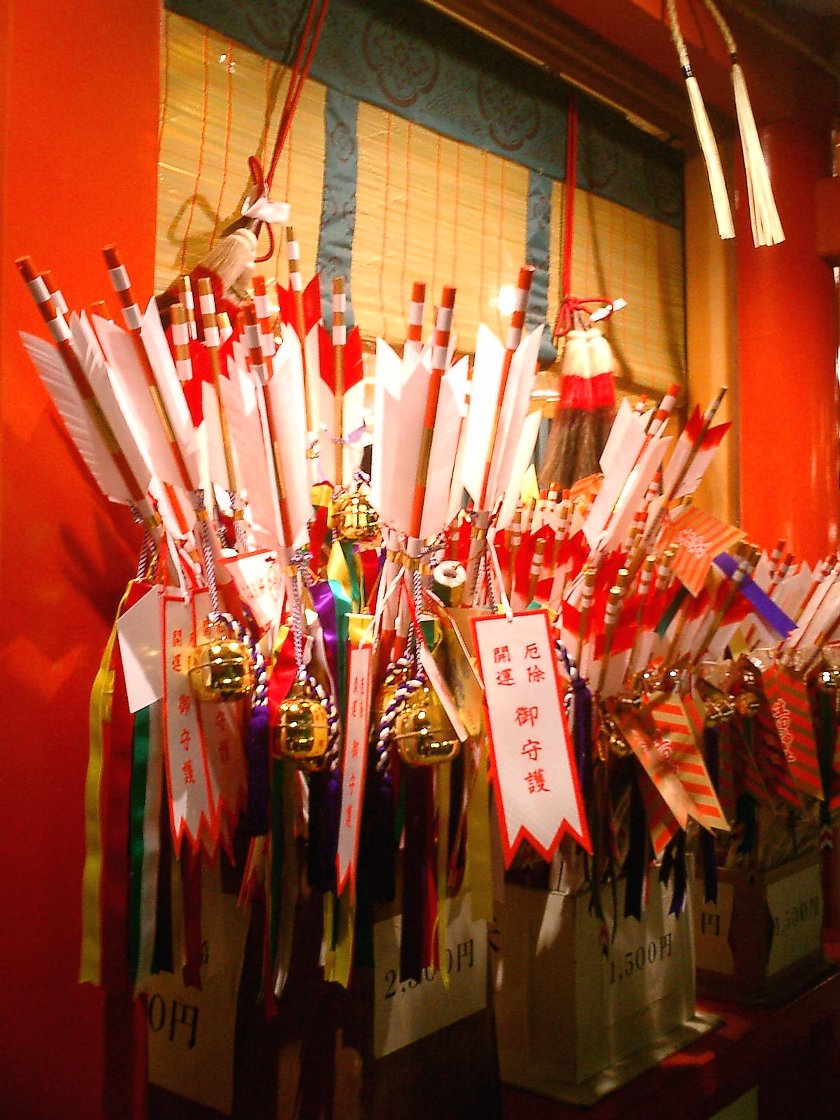
Hamaya at Ikuta Shrine

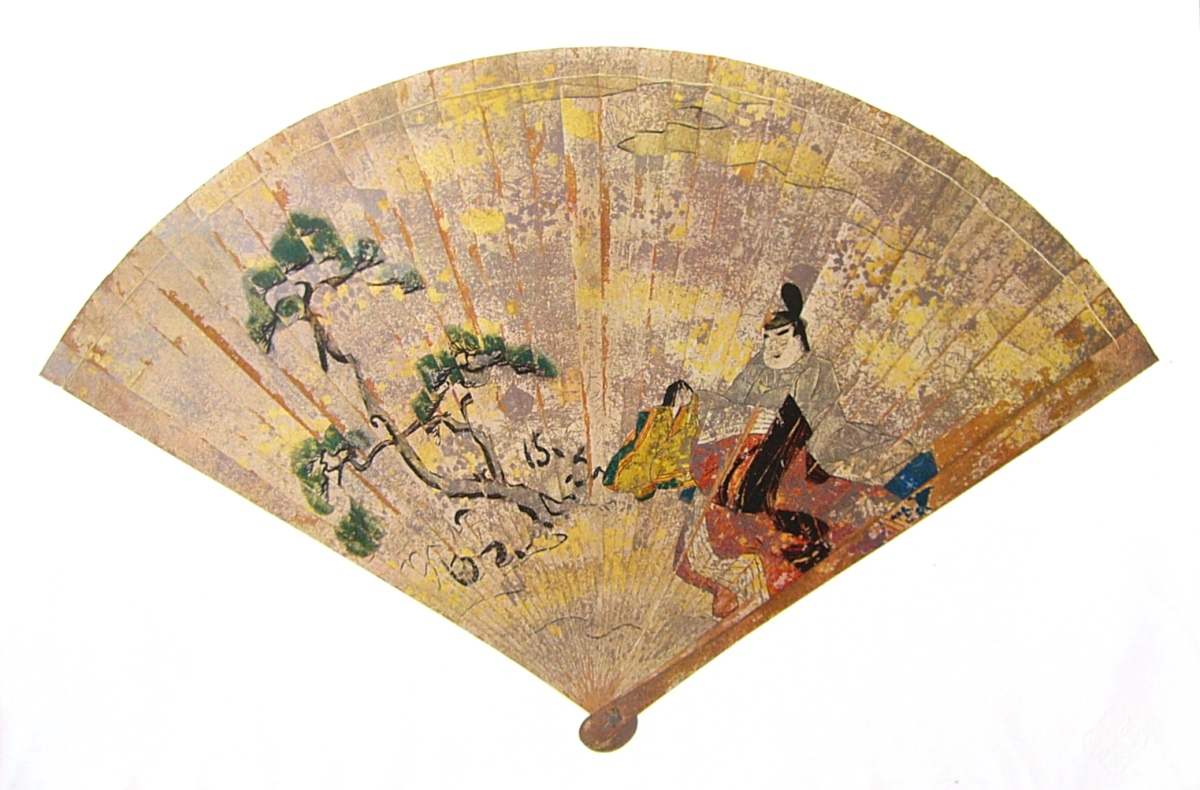
Japanese foldable fan of late Heian period (12th century)

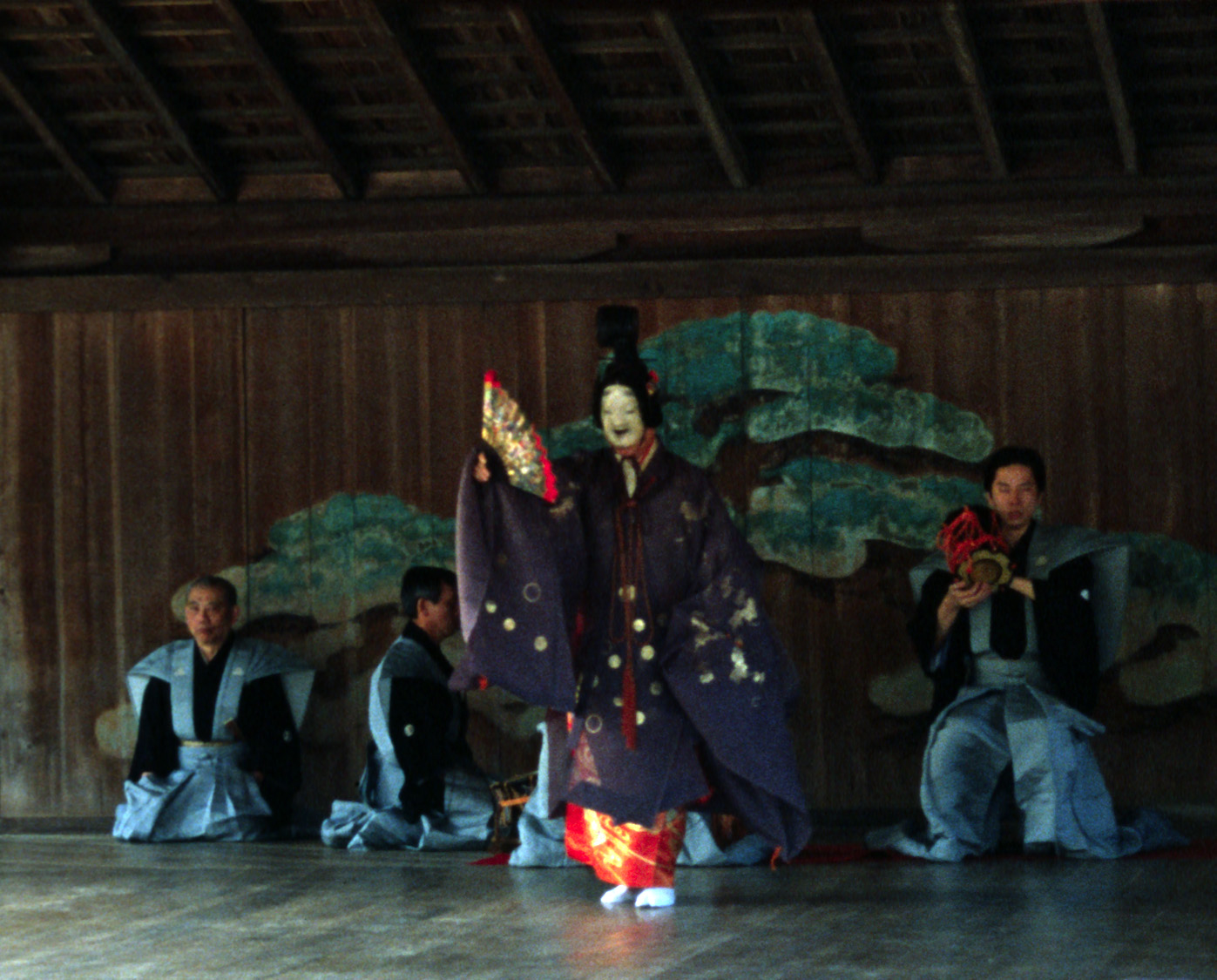
Traditional Japanese ceremony at Itsukushima Shrine

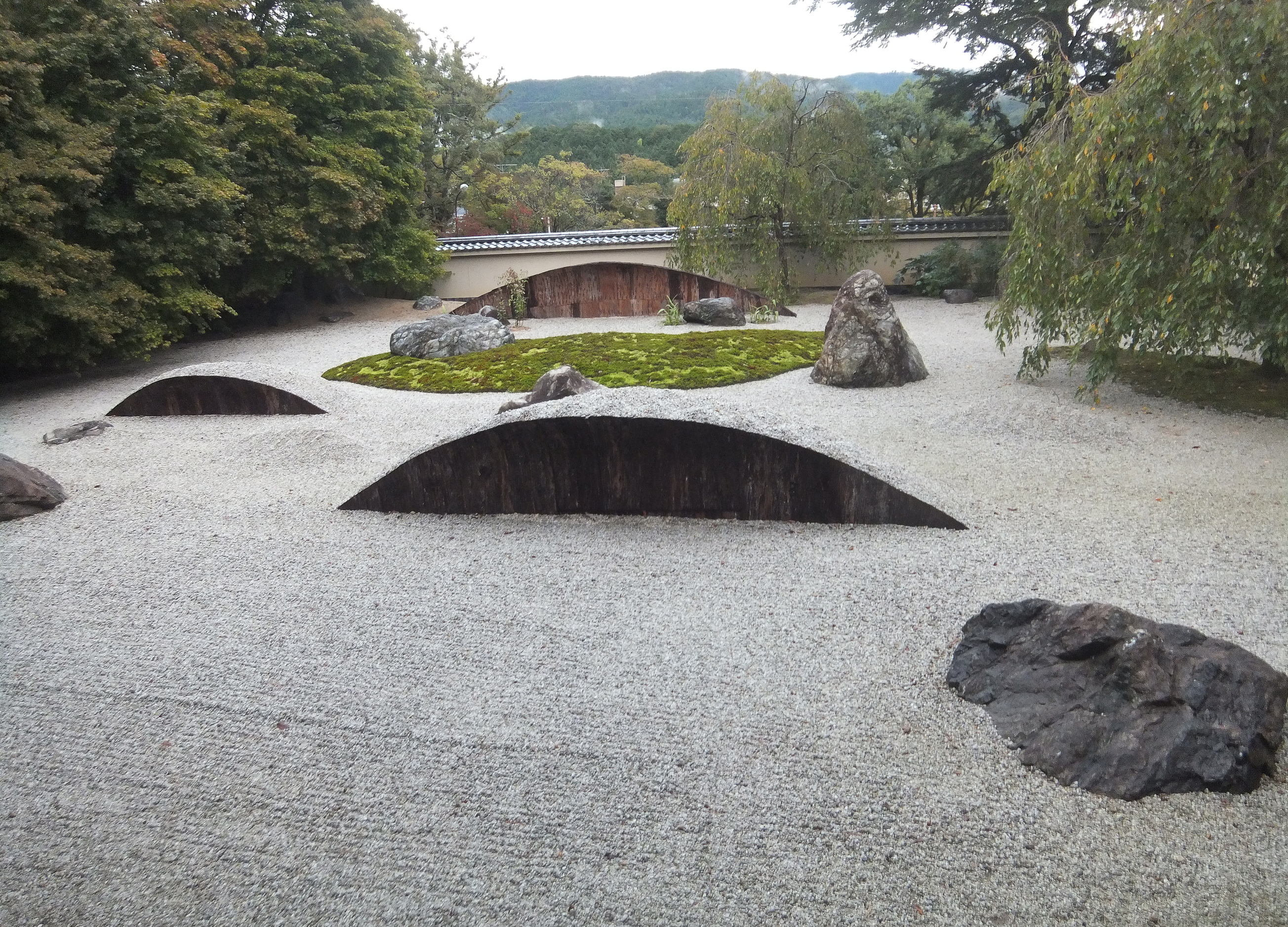
Jissō-in rock garden in Iwakura (Kyoto), reformed in 2013

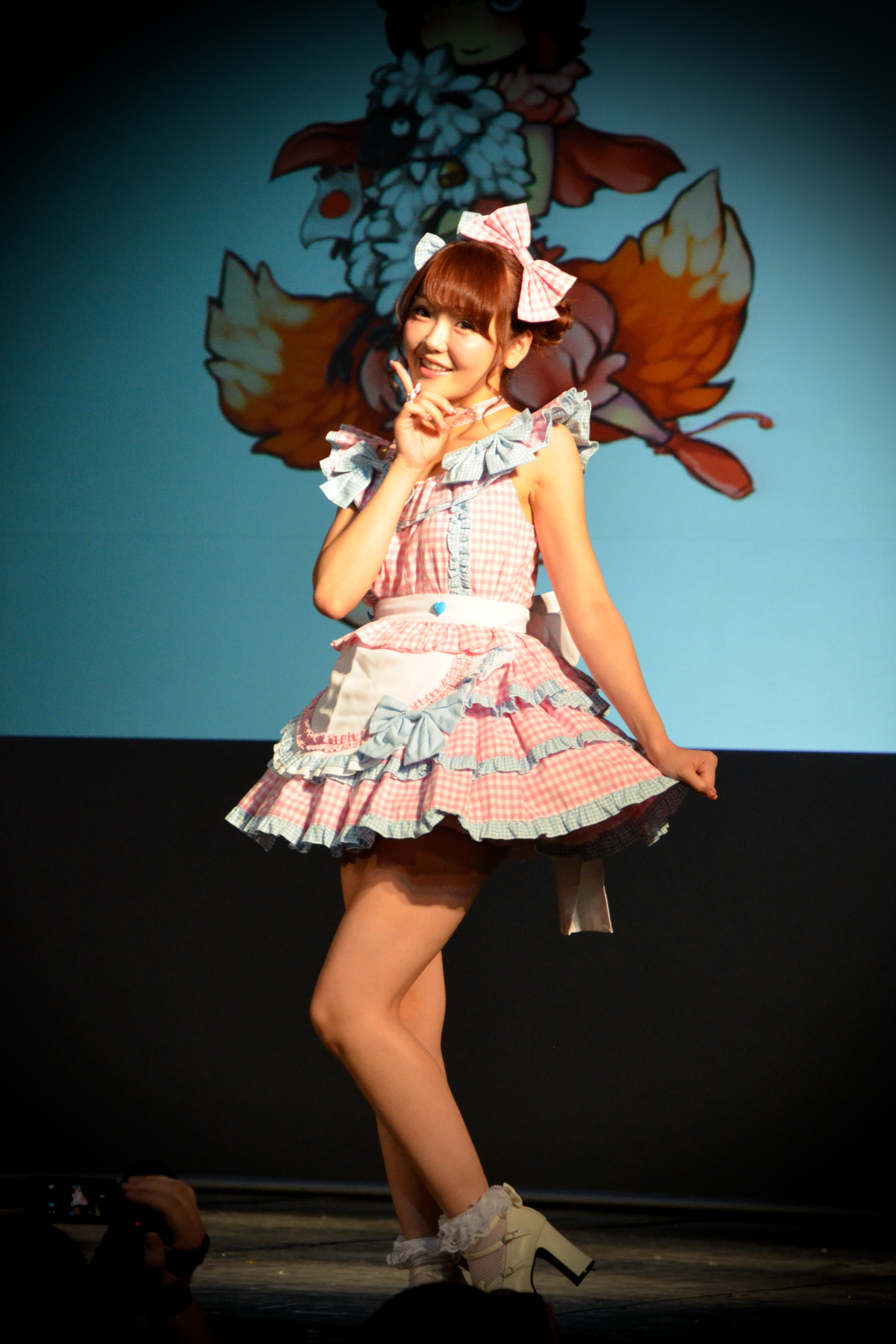
Lolita fashion is a fashion subculture that is highly influenced by Victorian and Edwardian from the Rococo period.

== See also ==
- Sinosphere
- Cool Japan
- History of Japan
- Marriage in Japan
- National symbols of Japan
- List of World Heritage Sites in Japan
- Imperial House of Japan
- Tourism in Japan
- Japanese language
- Etiquette in Japan
- Religion in Japan
- Japanese cuisine
- Japanese aesthetics
- Japanese music
- Japanese performing arts
- Science and technology in Japan
- Japanese martial arts
- Japanese influence on Korean culture
- Korean influence on Japanese culture
- Chinese influence on Japanese culture
- Yamato damashii
