= List of Japanese flags =

This is a list of Japanese flags, past and present. Historically, each daimyō had his own flag. (See sashimono and uma-jirushi.)

== National flags ==
Flag	Date	Use	Description
	13 August 1999 – present	Civil and state flag and ensign of Japan.	Flag ratio: 2:3. This flag was designated by Proclamation No. 127, 1999. The sun-disc is perfectly centered and is a brighter shade of red.
	27 February 1870 – 13 August 1999	Civil and state flag and ensign of the Empire of Japan, and the Japanese state.	Flag ratio: 7:10. Disc is shifted 1% towards the hoist (left). This flag was designated by Proclamation No. 57, 1870.

== Imperial flags ==
Flag	Date	Use	Description
	1869–present	Imperial standard of the Emperor of Japan	A gold sixteen-petal chrysanthemum centered on a red background
	2019–present	Imperial standard of the Emperor Emeritus	Similar to the standard of the Emperor, but with a darker background
	1926–present	Imperial standard of the Empress, the Empress Dowager, the Grand Empress Dowager and the Empress Emerita	A pennant version of the standard of the Emperor
	1926–present	Imperial standard of the Regent of Japan	Similar to the standard of the Emperor, but with a white border
	1926–present	Imperial standard of the heir imperial son and the imperial grandson who is an heir apparent	Similar to the standard of the Emperor, but with a white orle
	1926–present	Imperial standard of the wife of the heir imperial son and the wife of the imperial grandson	A pennant version of the standard of the heir imperial son
	2020–present	Imperial standard of the Crown Prince if not the son of the Emperor	A gold sixteen-petal chrysanthemum centered on a white background with a red orle and border
	1926–present	Imperial standard of other members of the Imperial House	Similar to the standard of the Crown Prince, but without the red orle

== Governmental flags ==
Flag	Date	Use	Description
	1872–1887	Ensign of Japan Post	Hinomaru with a red horizontal bar placed in the center of the flag.
	1892–present	Ensign of Japan Customs	White represents land, blue represents sea, and the red disc represents the customs on a border.

== Military flags ==
=== Imperial Army/Navy and Self-Defense Forces ===
Flag	Date	Use	Description
	1954–present	Flag of the Japan Self-Defense Forces and the Japan Ground Self-Defense Force	A sun disc design with eight red rays extending outward, and a gold border partially around the edge.
	1945–present	Ensign of the Japan Maritime Self-Defense Force	Sun disc with sixteen rays on a white field, with the disc skewed to the hoist.
	1889–1945	Ensign of the Imperial Japanese Navy	Sun disc with sixteen rays on a white field, with the disc skewed to the hoist.
	1955–1957	Ensign of the Japan Air Self-Defense Force	
	1957–1972	Ensign of the Japan Air Self-Defense Force	
	1972–2001	Ensign of the Japan Air Self-Defense Force	
	2001–present	Ensign of the Japan Air Self-Defense Force	
	1972–present	Standard of the Prime Minister of Japan	Five cherry blossoms on a purple background.
	1972–present	Naval standard of the Prime Minister of Japan	Five cherry blossoms on a purple background.
	1972–present	Standard of the Minister of Defense of Japan	Five cherry blossoms on a red-brown background.
	1972–present	Naval standard of the Minister of Defense of Japan	Five cherry blossoms on a red-brown background.
	1972–present	Standard of the Vice Minister of Defense of Japan	Four cherry blossoms on a red-brown background.
	1972–present	Naval standard of the Vice Minister of Defense of Japan	Four cherry blossoms on a red-brown background.
		Standard of Chief of Staff, Joint Staff	
	2025–present	Standard of Commander, Japan Self-Defense Forces Joint Operations Command	
	2024–present	Standard of Commander of Joint Unit	
		Standard of Chief of Staff of the Japan Ground Self-Defense Force	
		Standard of Chief of Staff of the Japan Maritime Self-Defense Force	
	1982–present	Standard of Chief of Staff of the Japan Air Self-Defense Force	
	1965–present	Standard of vice admiral of the Japan Maritime Self-Defense Force	
	1965–present	Standard of rear admiral of the Japan Maritime Self-Defense Force	
	1965–present	Standard of commodore of the Japan Maritime Self-Defense Force	
	1965–present	Standards of commander of the Japan Maritime Self-Defense Force	
	1965–present	Standard of senior captain of the Japan Maritime Self-Defense Force	
	1954–present	Masthead pennant of the Japan Maritime Self-Defense Force	
	1905–1945; 2011–present	The "Z flag", unofficial naval ensign	Derived from International maritime signal flag "Z"; made famous by its use to signal the opening of the Battle of Tsushima.
	1999–present	Standard of the army commander of the Japan Ground Self-Defense Force	
		Standard of the divisional commander of the Japan Ground Self-Defence Force	Army commander's flag until March 1999.
		Standard of the brigade commander of the Japan Ground Self-Defense Force	The brigade commander's flag is the flag of the six brigades that were reorganized from the four divisions and two combined brigades, and newly established in March 1999.
		Standard of the brigade commander of the Japan Ground Self-Defense Force	The brigade commander's flag is the flag of other brigades. It was used as a flag for divisional commanders until March 1999.
	Until 1999	Standard of the former brigade commander of the Japan Ground Self-Defense Force	It was used until March 1999. This flag was used not only by the major general but also when the colonel was the brigade commander.
	1972–present	Flag of infantry battalion of the Japan Ground Self-Defense Force	
	1982–2001	Standard of lieutenant general of the Japan Air Self-Defense Force	Standard of the commander in chief of the air defense command of the Japan Air Self-Defense Force from 1982 until 2001.
	1982–2001	Standard of major general of the Japan Air Self-Defense Force	Standard of the air division commander of the Japan Air Self-Defense Force from 1982 until 2001.
	1980–present	Flag of the Japan Ground Self-Defense Force reserve	
	1870–1945	War flag/ensign of the Imperial Japanese Army	White field with a centered red disc and sixteen red sun rays radiating to the edges.
	1945–present	War flag/ensign of the Japan Self-Defense Forces and the Japan Ground Self-Defense Force	White field with a centered red disc and sixteen red sun rays radiating to the edges.
	1889–1945	Standard of admiral of the Imperial Japanese Navy	
	1914–1945	Standard of vice admiral of the Imperial Japanese Navy	
	1914–1945	Standard of rear admiral of the Imperial Japanese Navy	
	1914–1945	Standard of commodore of the Imperial Japanese Navy	
	1914–1945	Standard of commander of the Imperial Japanese Navy	
	1914–1945	Standard of senior captain of the Imperial Japanese Navy	
	1870–1945	Standard of duty ship of the Imperial Japanese Navy	

=== Japan Coast Guard ===
Flag	Date	Use	Description
	1951–present	Ensign of the Japan Coast Guard	The symbol represents a mariner's compass.
	1951–present	Standard of the Minister of Land, Infrastructure, Transport and Tourism	
	1951–present	Standard of the Japan Coast Guard commandant	
	1951–present	Standard of the commander of Regional Coast Guard Headquarters	
	1951–present	Flag of the commander	

== Historical flags ==
Flag	Date	Use	Description
	13th–19th century	Military flag of the warriors loyal to Japanese court	A red field with a golden disc in the center and a three-tongued fringe at the fly. In reality, it was hoisted vertically.
	1429–1879	Merchant flag of the Ryukyu Kingdom	A triangular yellow field with a red border and a red disc in the center.
	1641–1858	Dutch flag used in Dejima	A horizontal tricolor of red, white, and blue.
	1603–1868	Naval ensign of the Tokugawa Shogunate	A vertical triband of white, black, and white.
	1868–1869	Flag used by the Satsuma army during the Boshin War	A horizontal bicolour of red and white.
	1905–1910	Flag of the Resident-General of Korea	A Blue Ensign with the flag of Japan in the canton.
	1945–1952	Civil and naval ensign during the occupation of Japan	Derived from International maritime signal flag "E".
	1950 (Jan.–Mar.)	Proposed flag of Okinawa	Called the Okinawan Flag (沖縄旗) or the Ryukyu Flag (琉球旗), proposed by the Okinawa Civil Government. The US administration stated they would decide the flag after the foundation of the unified government of the islands. However, the flag was forgotten ever since. Red, white, and blue represent peace, freedom, and enthusiasm, respectively. A star represents hope.
	1952–1967	Civil ensign during the occupation of Okinawa	Derived from International maritime signal flag "D".
	1967–1972	Civil ensign of the Government of the Ryukyu Islands	The flag of Japan with a pennant above reading "Ryukyus" and "琉球" ("Ryukyu").

=== Daimyō Flags ===
Flags attributed to Japanese Daimyo in the Kaei period (1848–1854).

Arima clan of Kurume Domain (A)

Arima clan of Kurume Domain (B)

Arima clan of Kurume Domain (C)

Asano clan of Hiroshima Domain (A)

Asano clan of Hiroshima Domain (B)

Asano clan of Hiroshima Domain (C)

Date clan of Uwajima Domain (A)

Date clan of Uwajima Domain (B)

Date clan of Uwajima Domain (C)

Date clan of Sendai Domain (A)

Date clan of Sendai Domain (B)

Date clan of Sendai Domain (C)

Hachisuka clan of Tokushima Domain (A)

Hachisuka clan of Tokushima Domain (B)

Hachisuka clan of Tokushima Domain (C)

Hoshina Matsudaira clan of Aizu Domain (A)

Hoshina Matsudaira clan of Aizu Domain (B)

Hoshina Matsudaira clan of Aizu Domain (C)

Hosokawa clan of Kumamoto Domain (A)

Hosokawa clan of Kumamoto Domain (B)

Hosokawa clan of Kumamoto Domain (C)

Ii clan of Hikone Domain (A)

Ii clan of Hikone Domain (B)

Ii clan of Hikone Domain (C)

Ikeda clan of Okayama Domain (A)

Ikeda clan of Okayama Domain (B)

Ikeda clan of Okayama Domain (C)

Ikeda clan of Tottori Domain (A)

Ikeda clan of Tottori Domain (B)

Ikeda clan of Tottori Domain (C)

Kuroda clan of Fukuoka Domain (A)

Kuroda clan of Fukuoka Domain (B)

Kuroda clan of Fukuoka Domain (C)

Makino clan of Nagaoka Domain (A)

Makino clan of Nagaoka Domain (B)

Makino clan of Nagaoka Domain (C)

Maeda clan of Kaga Domain (A)

Maeda clan of Kaga Domain (B)

Maeda clan of Kaga Domain (C)

Matsudaira clan of Fukui Domain (A)

Matsudaira clan of Fukui Domain (B)

Matsudaira clan of Fukui Domain (C)

Matsudaira clan of Kuwana Domain (A)

Matsudaira clan of Kuwana Domain (B)

Matsudaira clan of Kuwana Domain (C)

Mōri clan of Chōshū Domain (A)

Mōri clan of Chōshū Domain (B)

Mōri clan of Chōshū Domain (C)

Nabeshima clan of Saga Domain (A)

Nabeshima clan of Saga Domain (B)

Nabeshima clan of Saga Domain (C)

Nanbu clan of Morioka Domain (A)

Nanbu clan of Morioka Domain (B)

Nanbu clan of Morioka Domain (C)

Ogasawara clan of Kokura Domain (A)

Ogasawara clan of Kokura Domain (B)

Ogasawara clan of Kokura Domain (C)

Ōmura clan of Omura Domain (A)

Ōmura clan of Omura Domain (B)

Ōmura clan of Omura Domain (C)

Satake clan of Kubota Domain (A)

Satake clan of Kubota Domain (B)

Satake clan of Kubota Domain (C)

Shimazu clan of Satsuma Domain (A)

Shimazu clan of Satsuma Domain (B)

Shimazu clan of Satsuma Domain (C)

Tōdō clan of Tsu Domain (A)

Tōdō clan of Tsu Domain (B)

Tōdō clan of Tsu Domain (C)

Tokugawa clan of Kishū Domain (A)

Tokugawa clan of Kishū Domain (B)

Tokugawa clan of Kishū Domain (C)

Tokugawa clan of Mito Domain (A)

Tokugawa clan of Mito Domain (B)

Tokugawa clan of Mito Domain (C)

Tokugawa clan of Owari Domain (A)

Tokugawa clan of Owari Domain (B)

Tokugawa clan of Owari Domain (C)

Uesugi clan of Yonezawa Domain (A)

Uesugi clan of Yonezawa Domain (B)

Uesugi clan of Yonezawa Domain (C)

Yamauchi clan of Tosa Domain (A)

Yamauchi clan of Tosa Domain (B)

Yamauchi clan of Tosa Domain (C)

=== Daimyō Banners present in old paintings ===
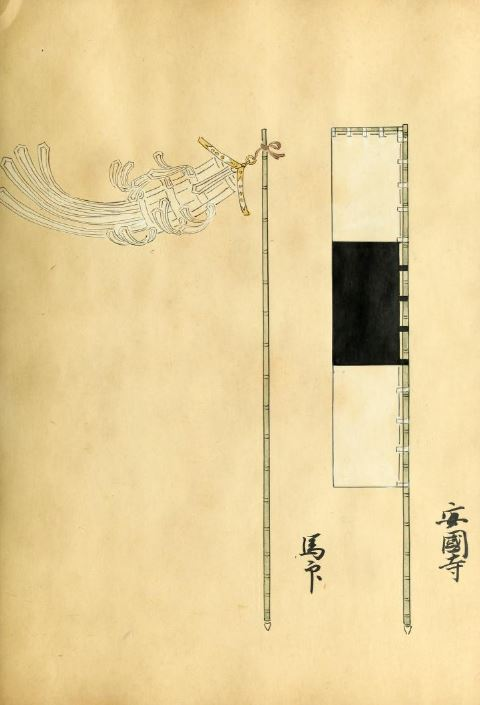
Ankokuji Ekei

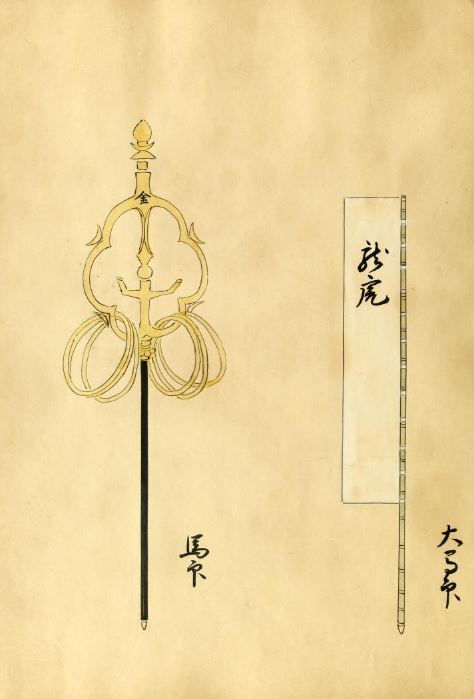
Ankokuji Ekei

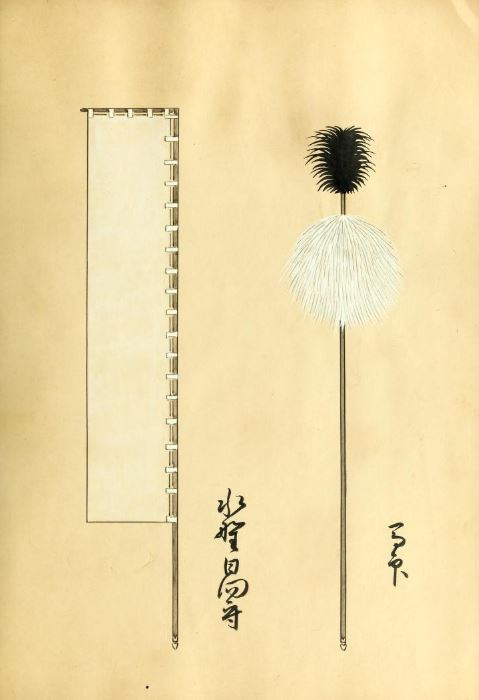
Arima Naozumi

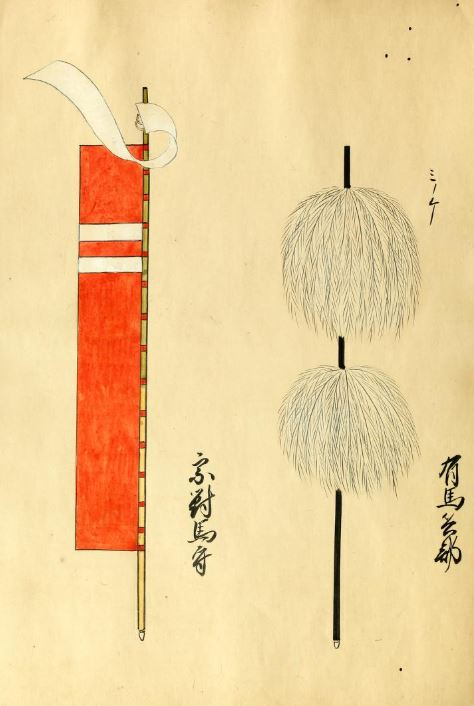
Arima Noriyari

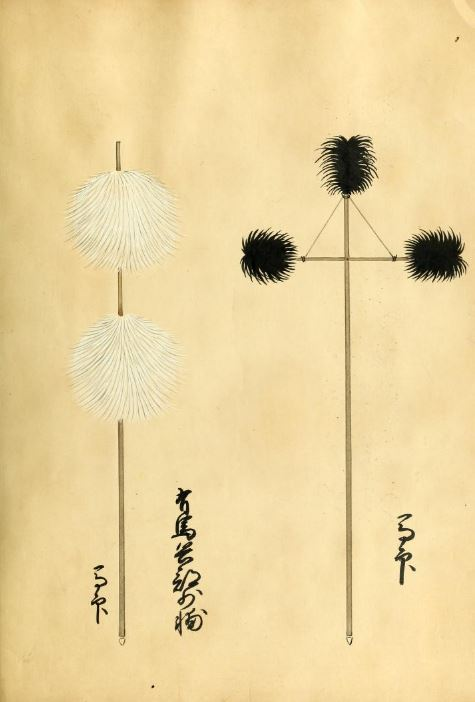
Arima Toyōji

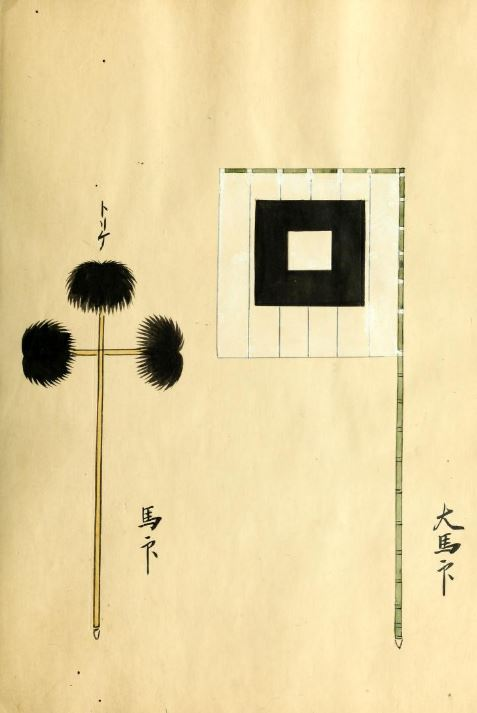
Arima Toyōji

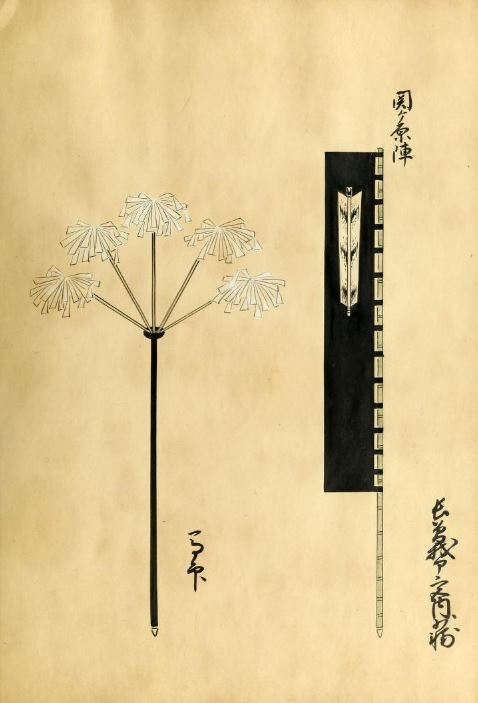
Chōsokabe Morichika

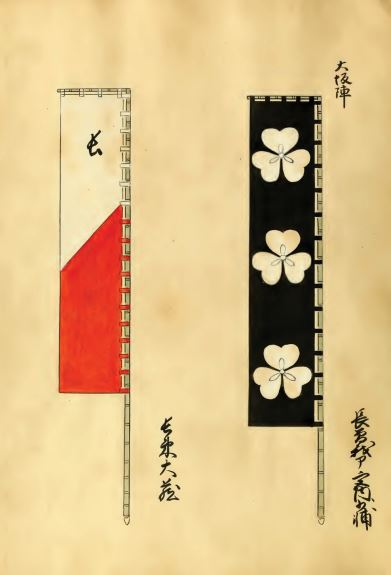
Chōsokabe Morichika

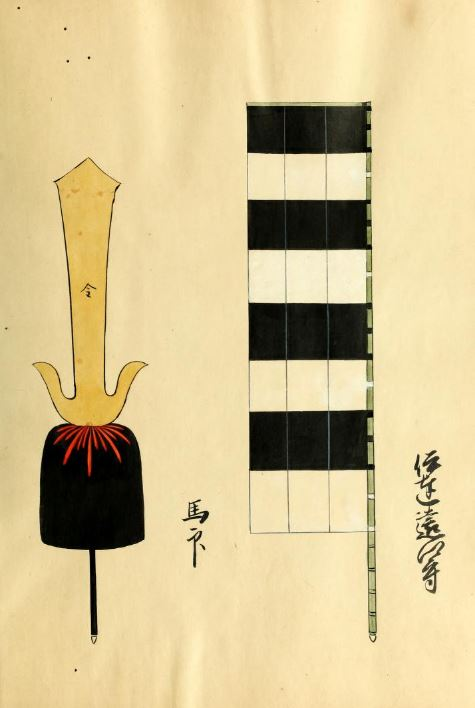
Date Hidemune

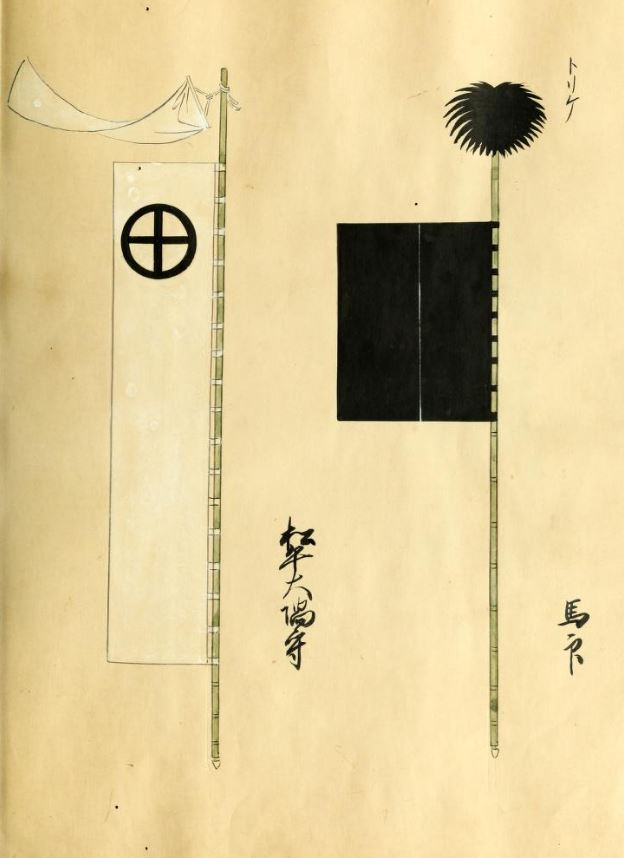
Date Masamune

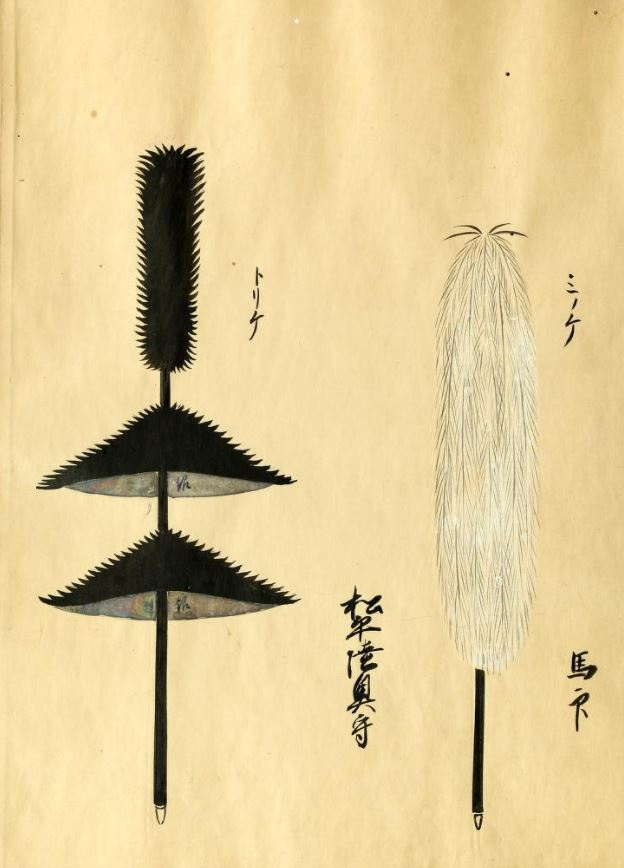
Date Masamune

Date Masamune

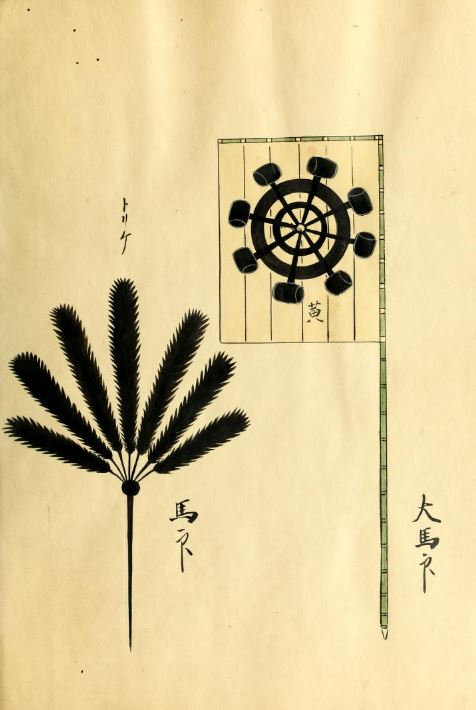
Doi Toshikatsu

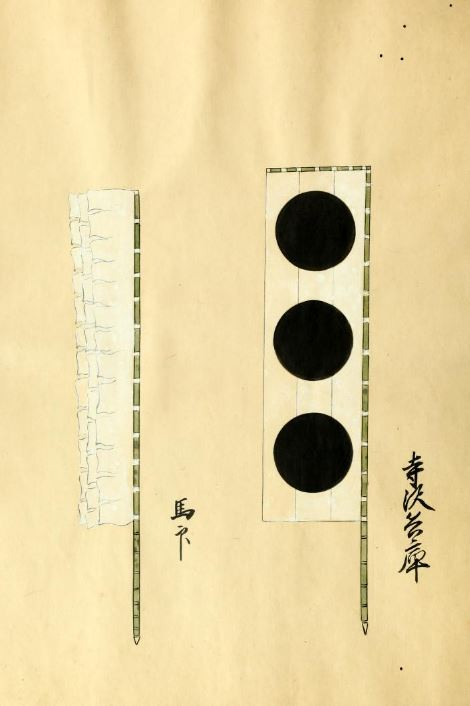
Doi Toshikatsu

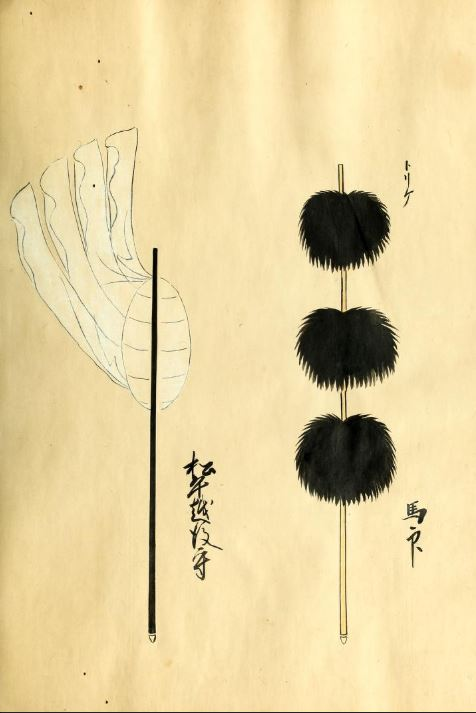
Hachisuka Iemasa

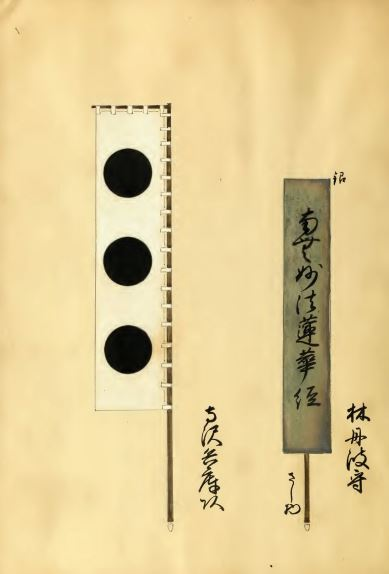
Hayashi Katsumasa

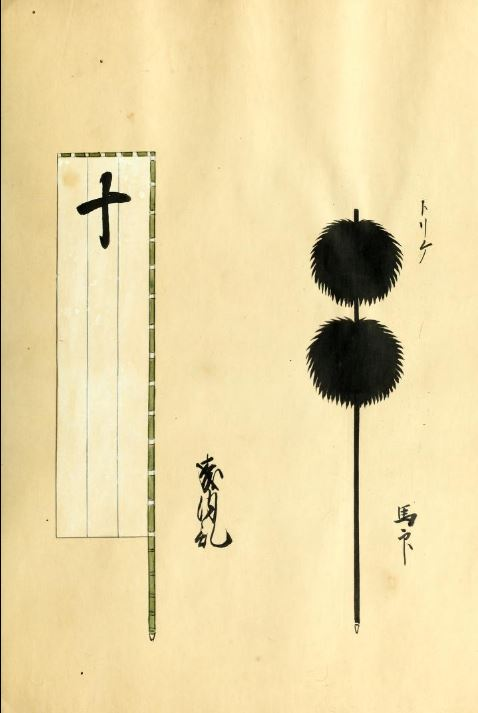
Honda Masatomo

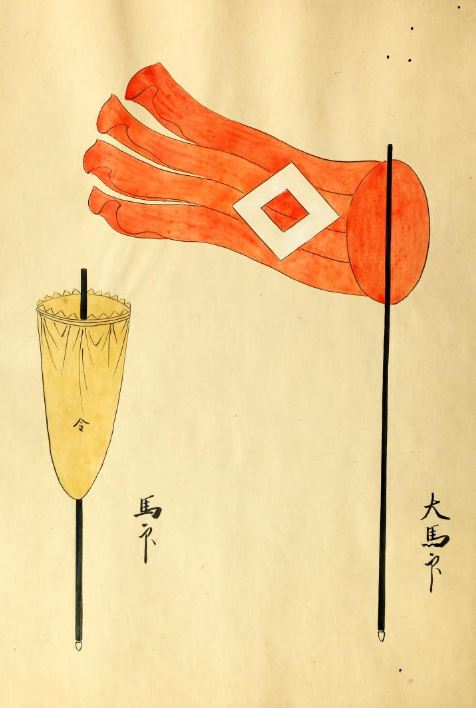
Hori Naoyori

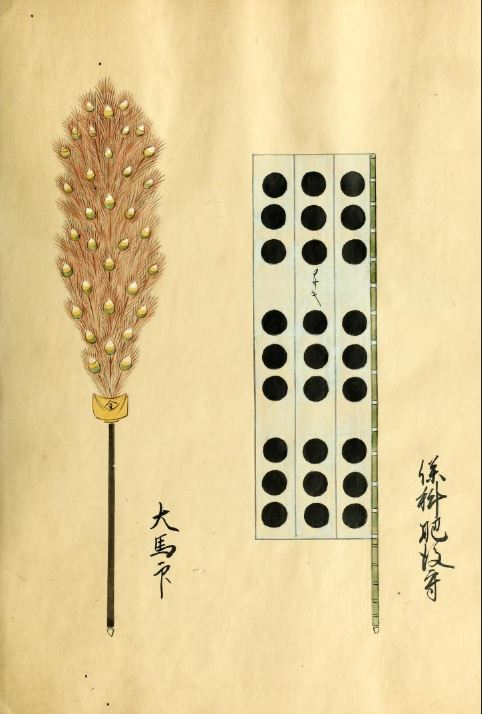
Hoshina Masayuki

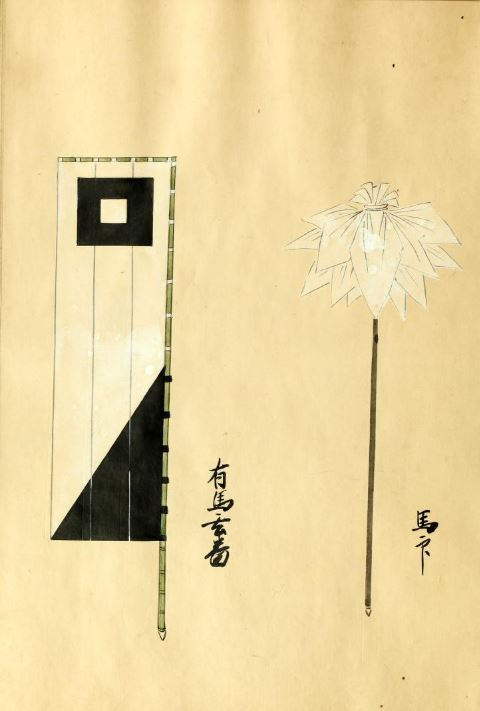
Hoshina Masayuki

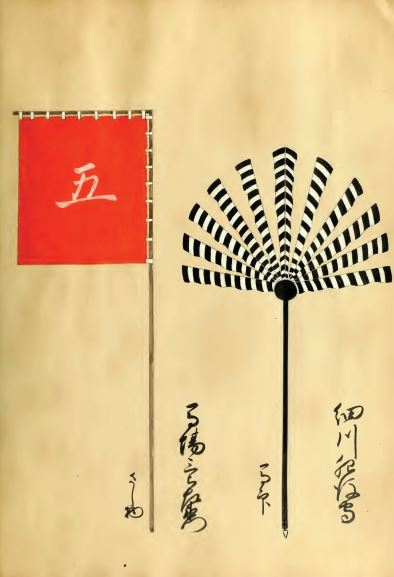
Hosokawa Mitsunao

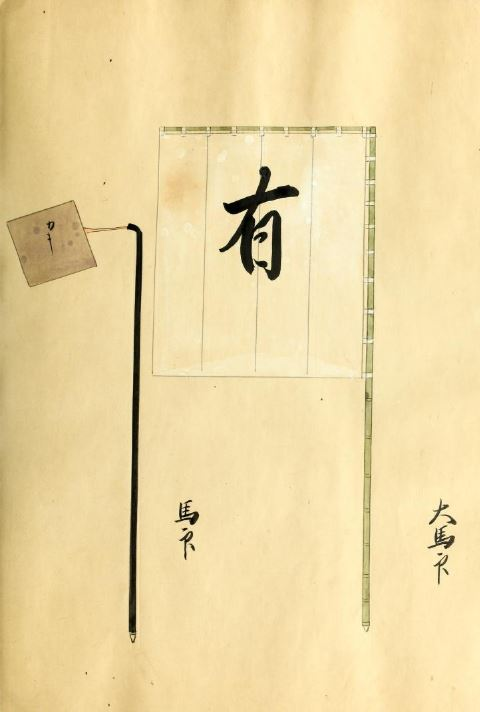
Hosokawa Tadaoki

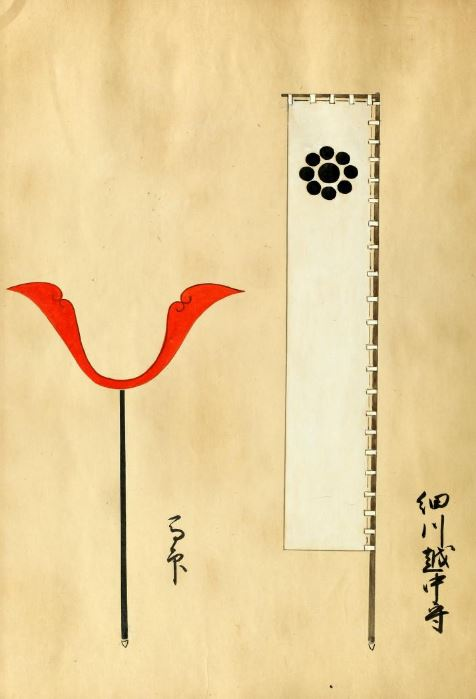
Hosokawa Tadatoshi

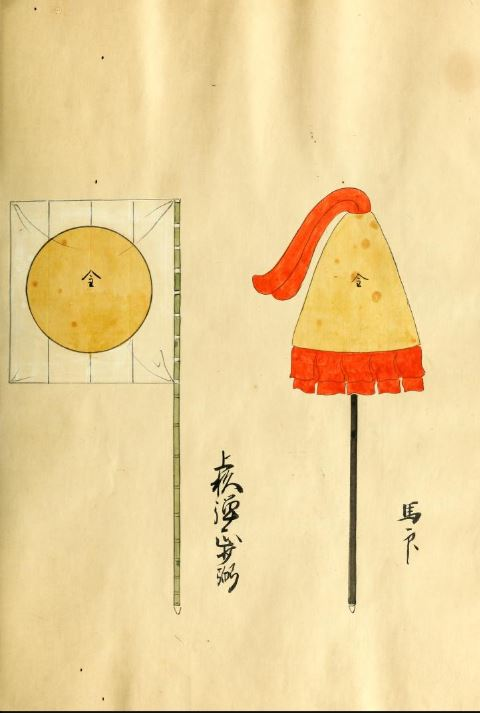
Ii Naotaka

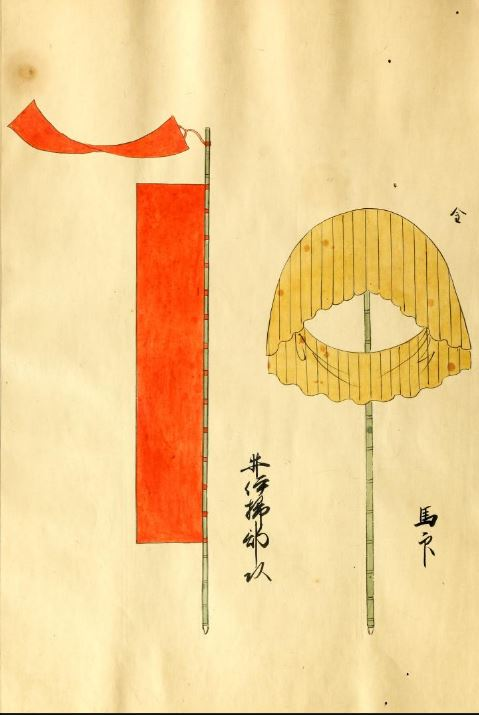
Ikeda Mitsumasa

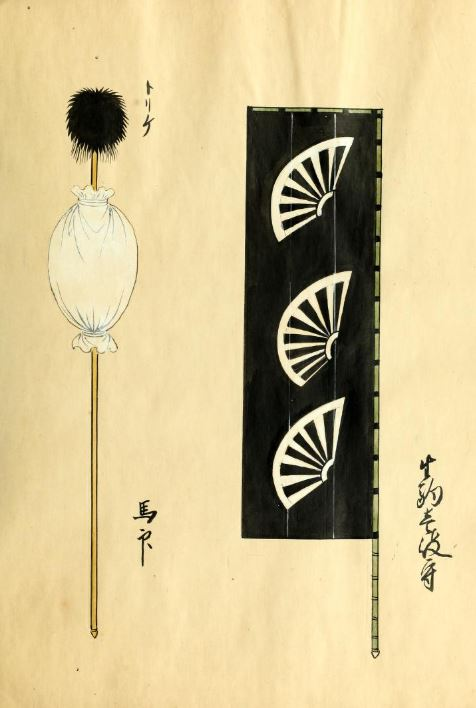
Ikoma Takatoshi

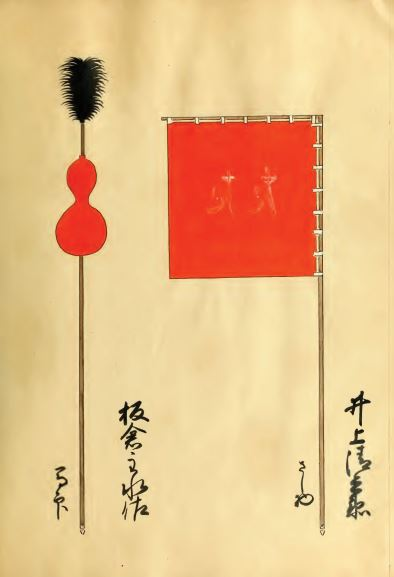
Inoue Masatsugu

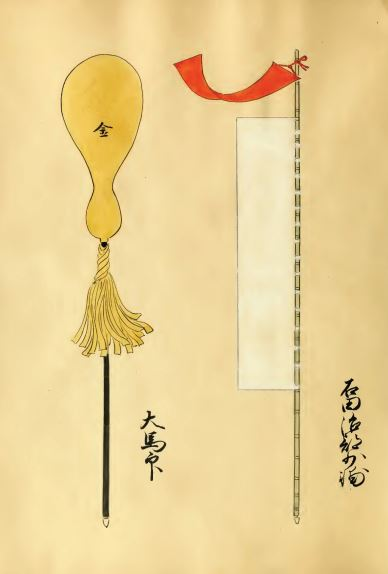
Ishida Mitsunari

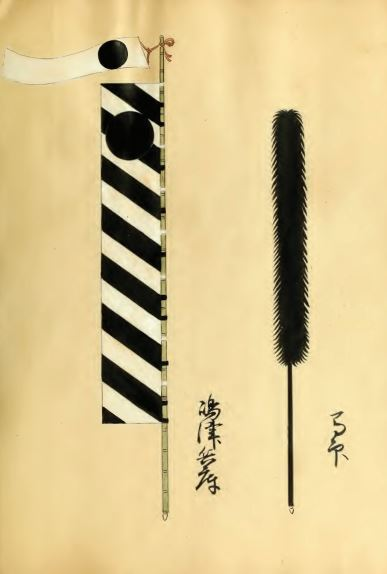
Ishida Mitsunari

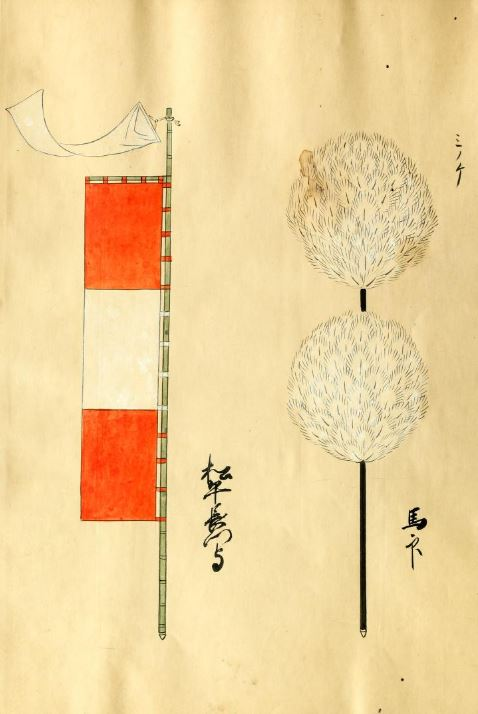
Katō Akinari

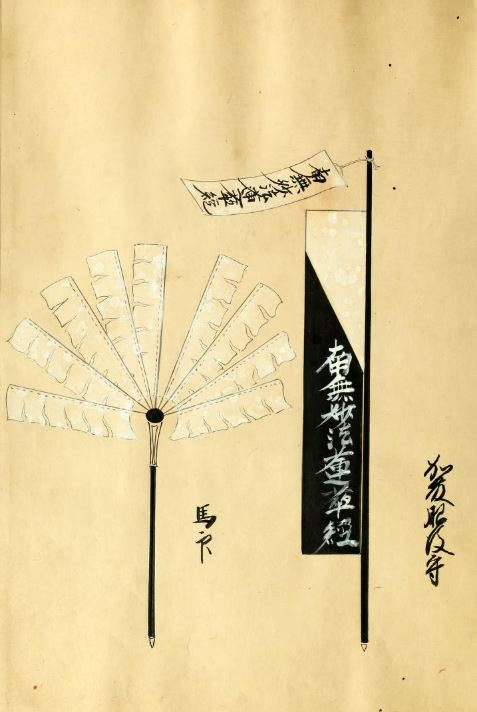
Katō Kiyomasa

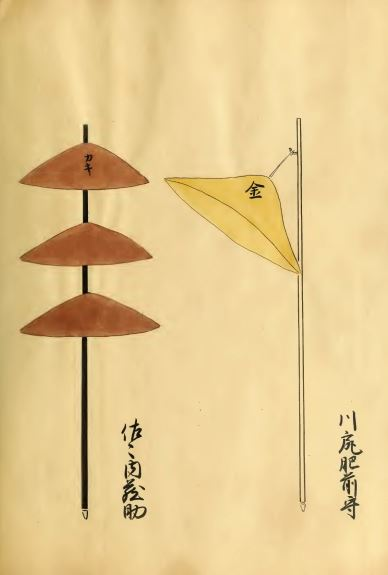
Kawajiri Hidetaka

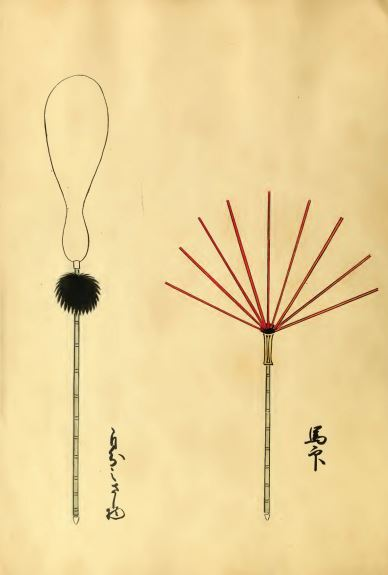
Kikkawa Hiroie

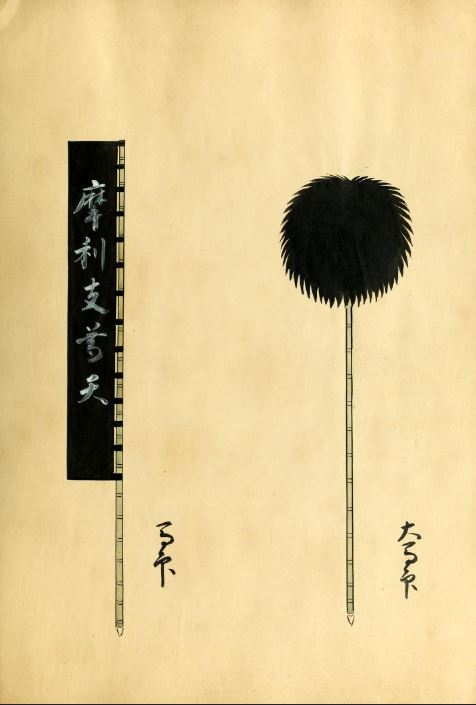
Kikkawa Hiroie

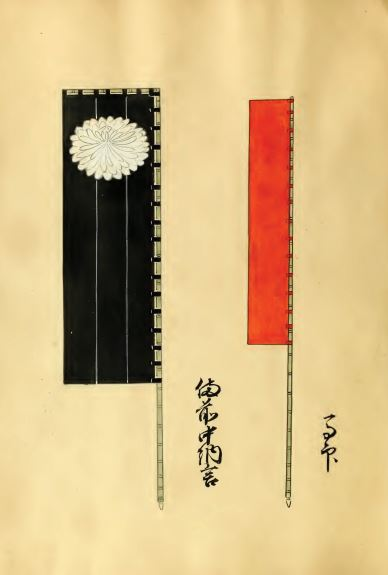
Kobayakawa Hideaki

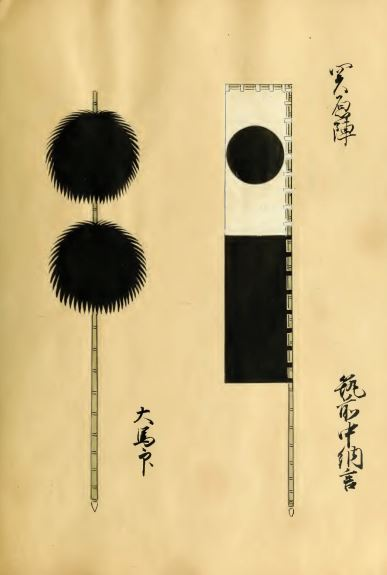
Kobayakawa Hideaki

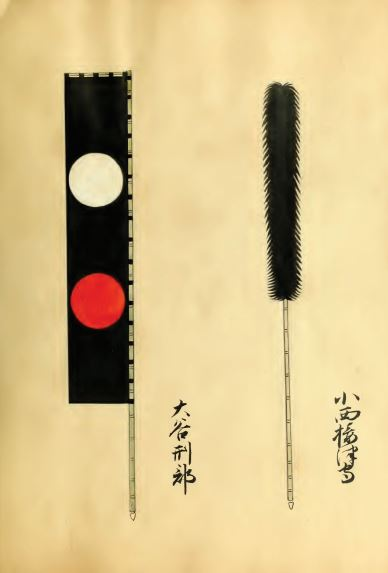
Konishi Yukinaga

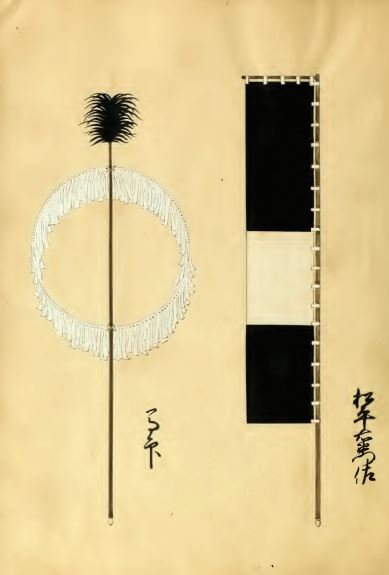
Kuroda Tadayuki

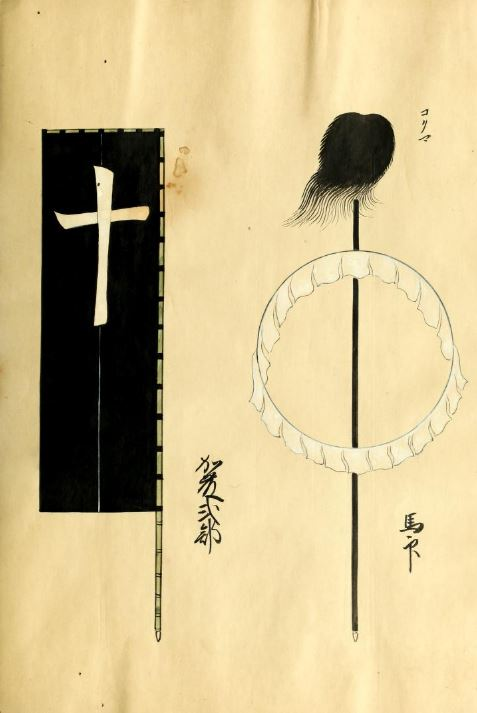
Kuroda Tadayuki

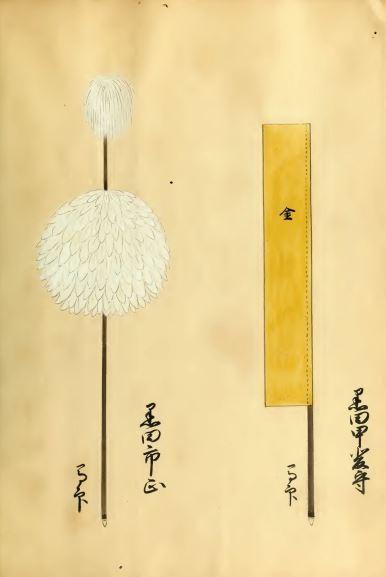
Kuroda Nagamasa

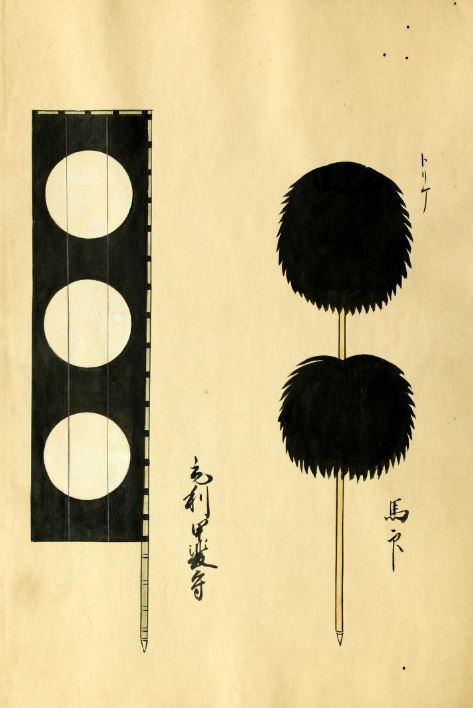
Kyōgoku Takatomo

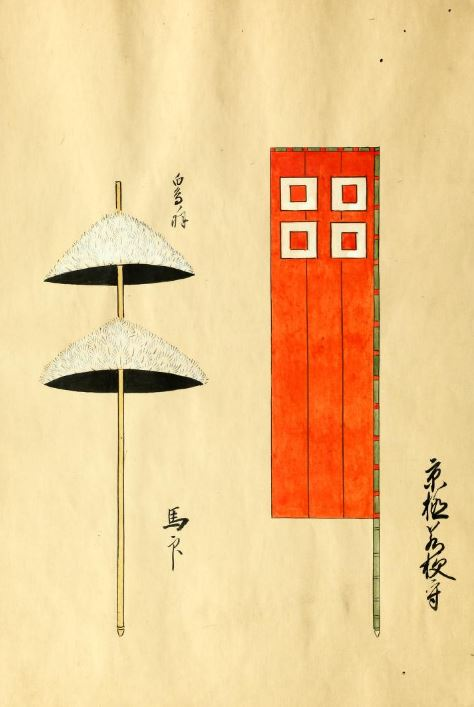
Kyōgoku Takatsugu

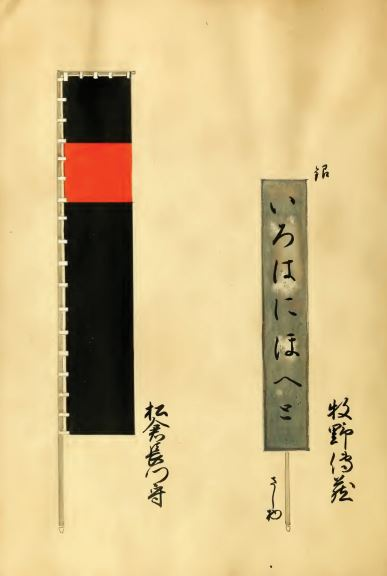
Makino Narizumi

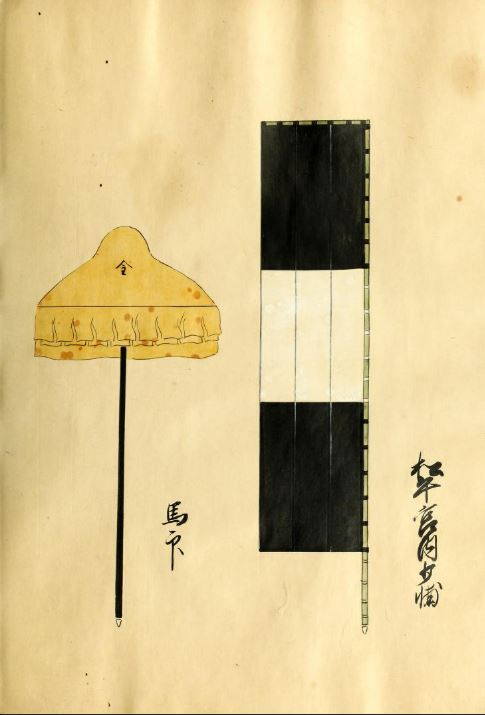
Matsudaira Tadakatsu

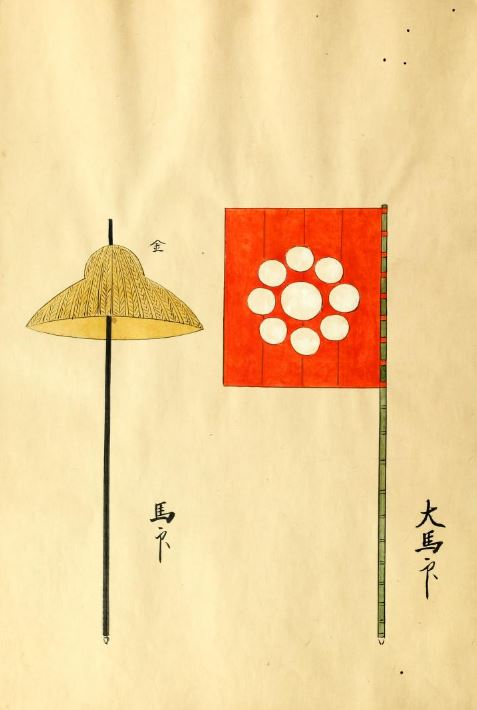
Matsudaira Chikatoki

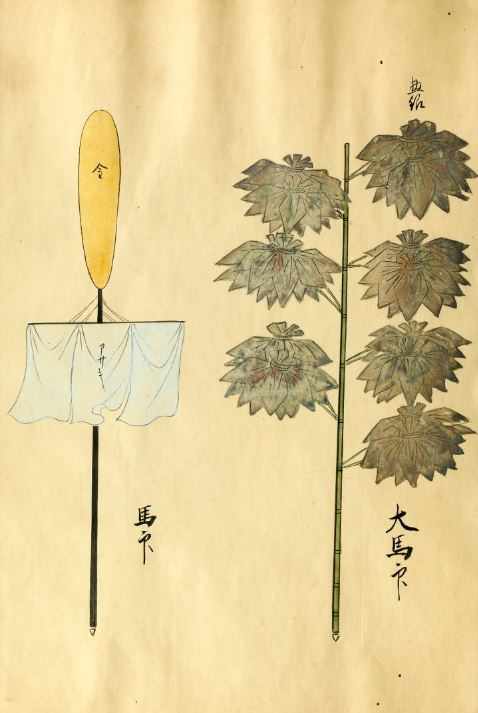
Matsudaira Mitsunaga

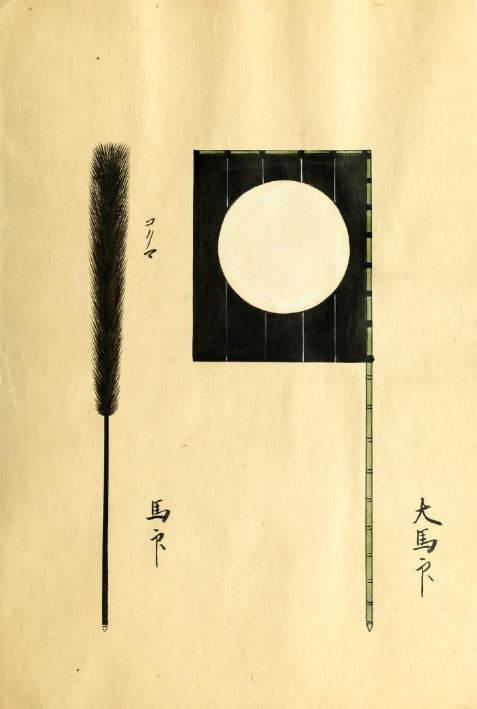
Matsudaira Naomasa

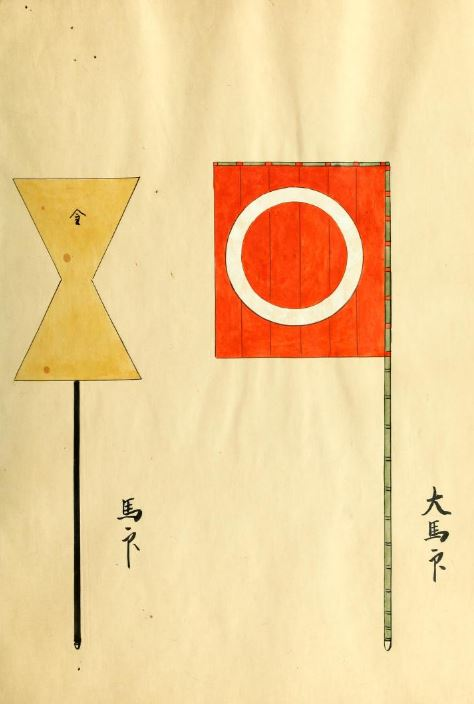
Matsudaira Naonori

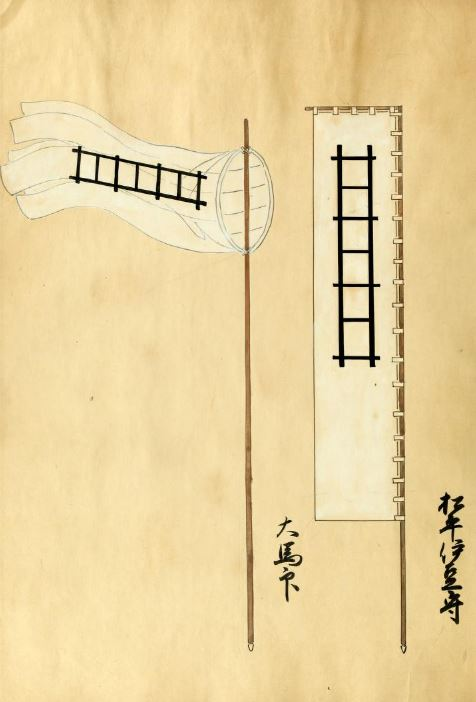
Matsudaira Nobutsuna

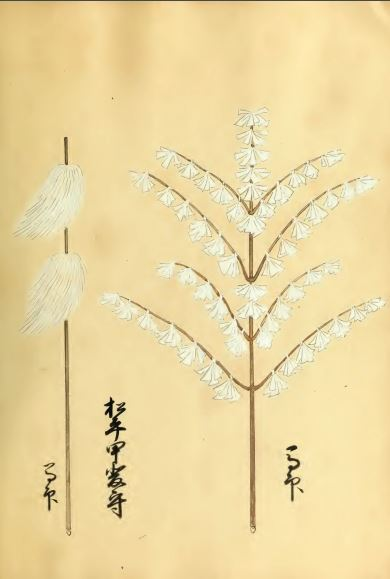
Matsudaira Nobutsuna

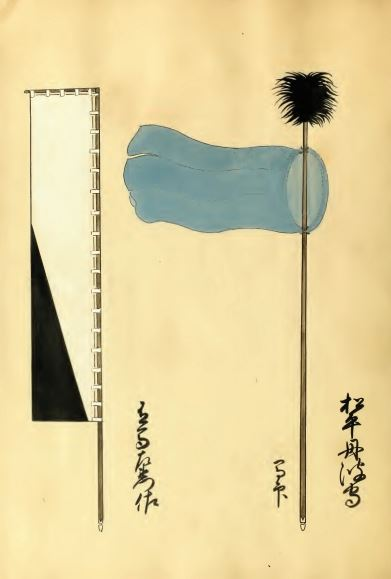
Matsudaira Shigenao

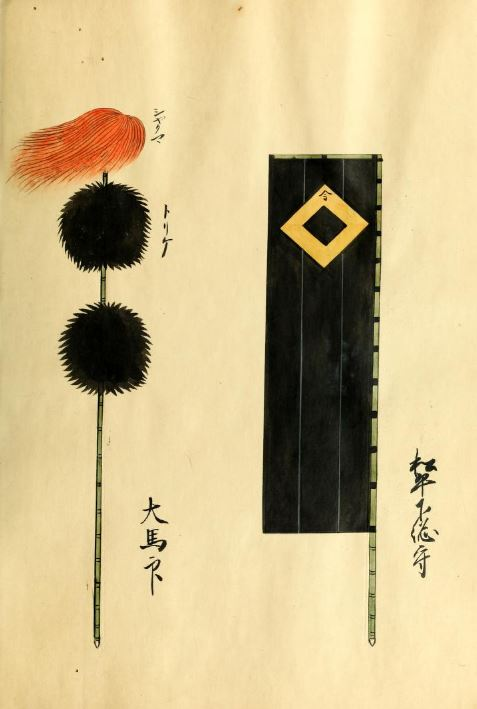
Matsudaira Tadaaki

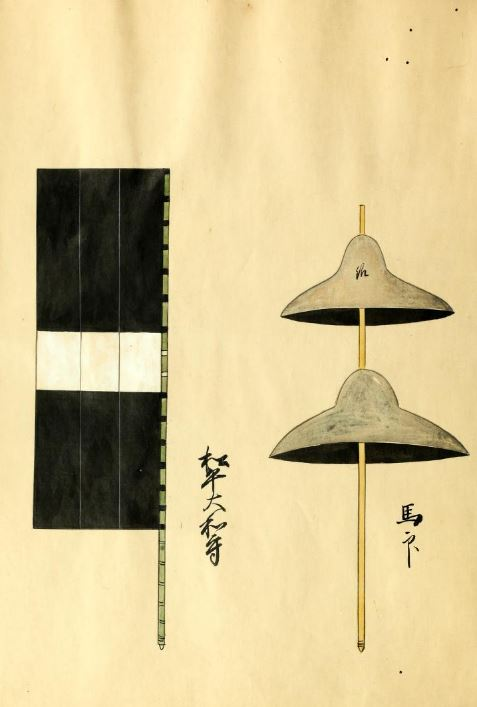
Matsudaira Tadaaki

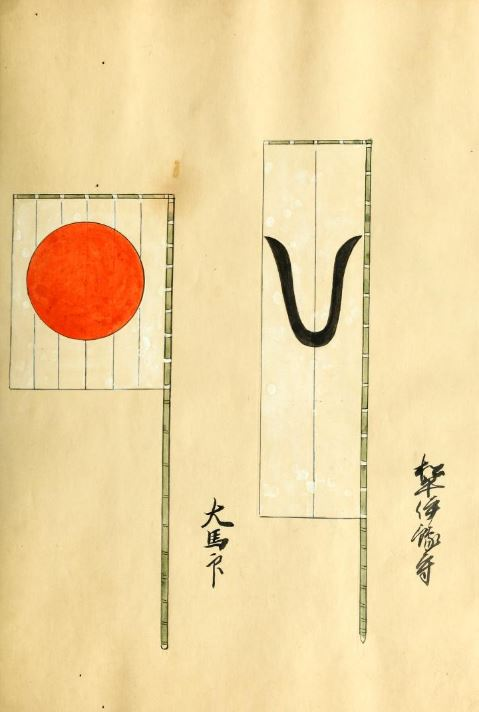
Matsudaira Tadamasa

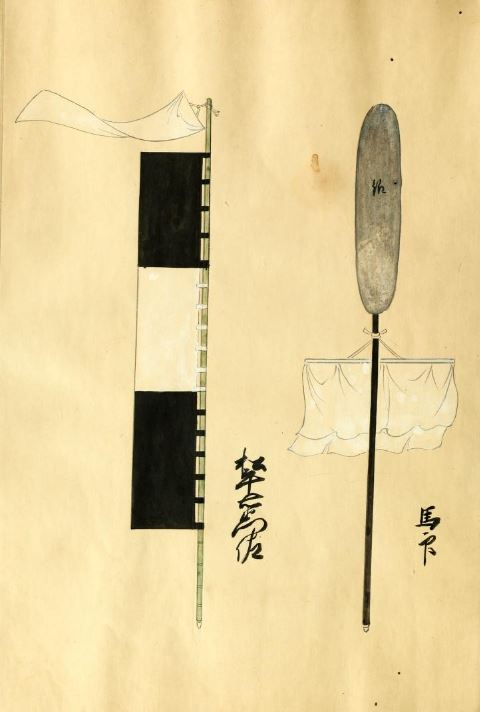
Matsudaira Tadamasa

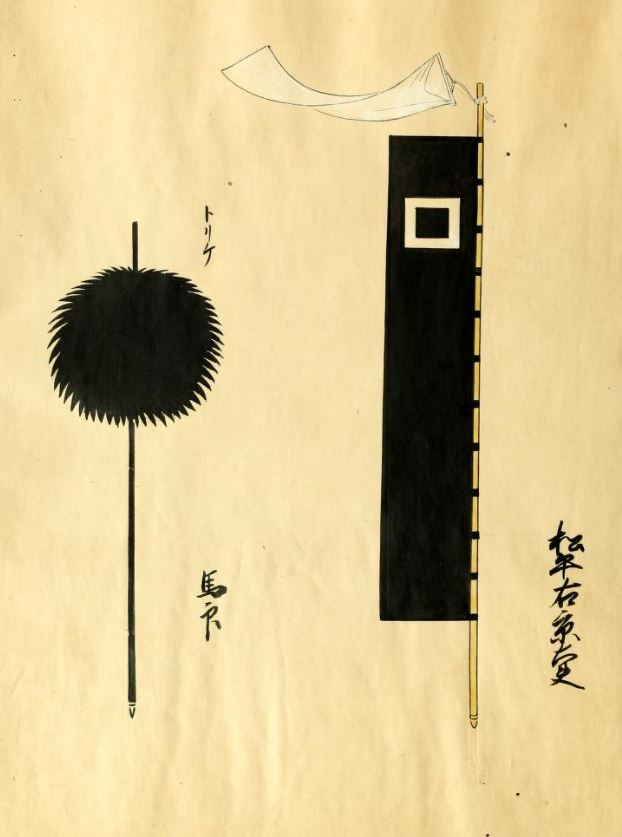
Matsudaira Terusada

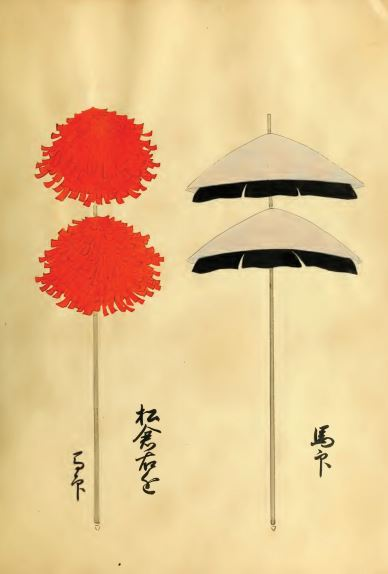
Matsukura Katsuie

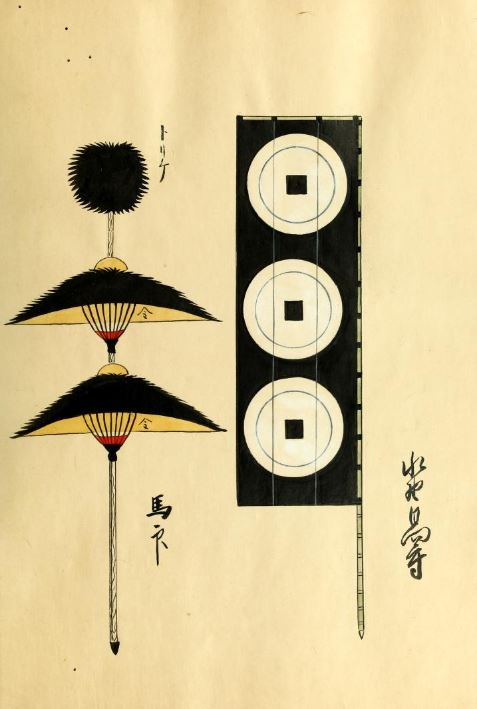
Mizuno Katsunari

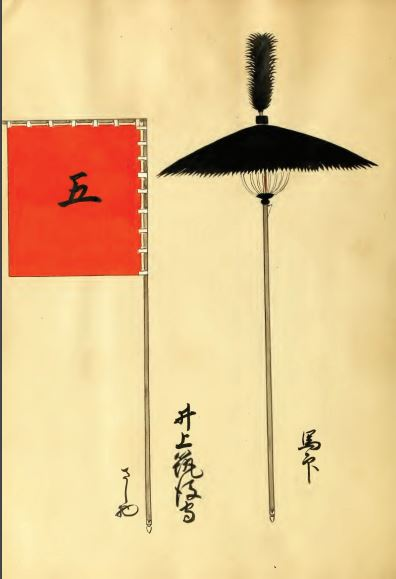
Mizuno Katsunari

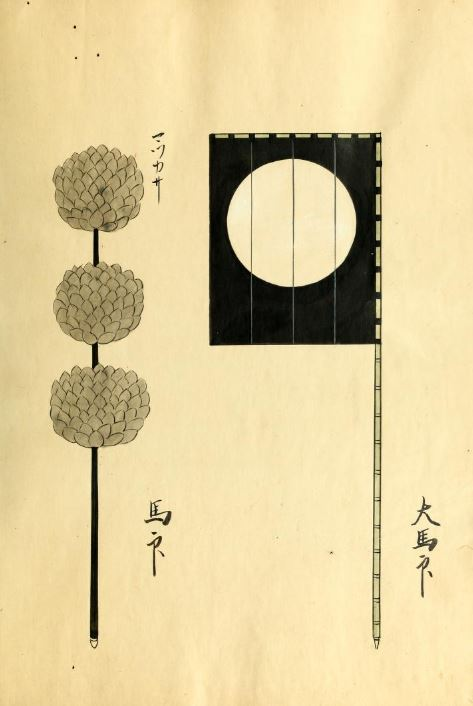
Mōri Hidemoto

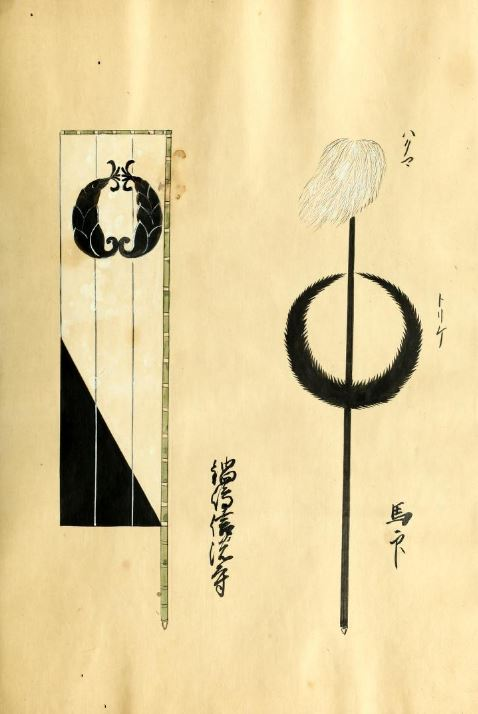
Mōri Hidenari

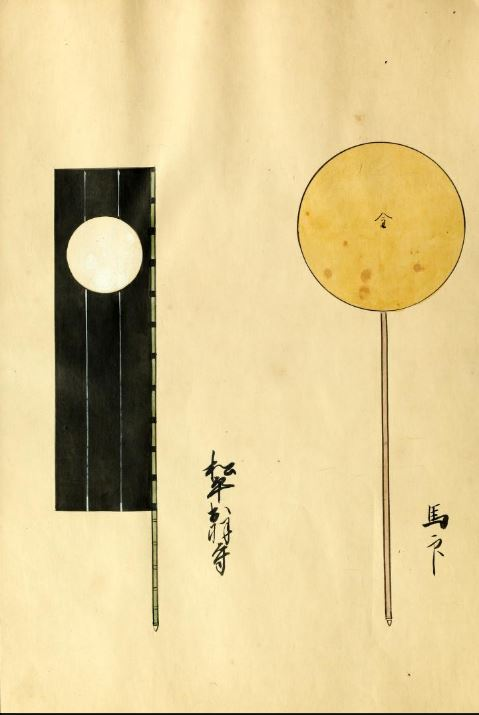
Mori Nagatsugu

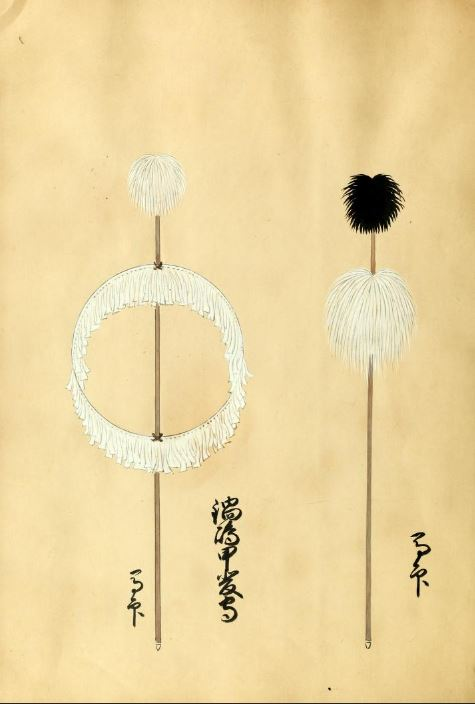
Nabeshima Katsushige

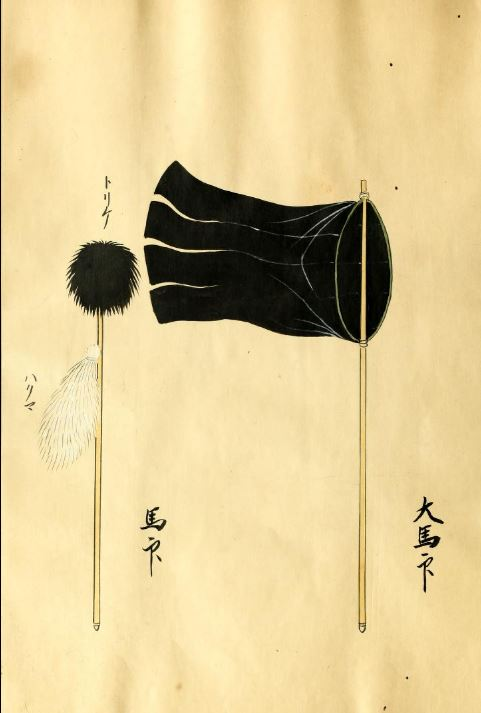
Nabeshima Katsushige

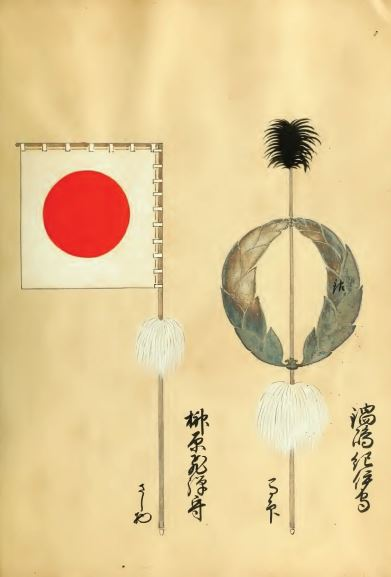
Nabeshima Motoshige

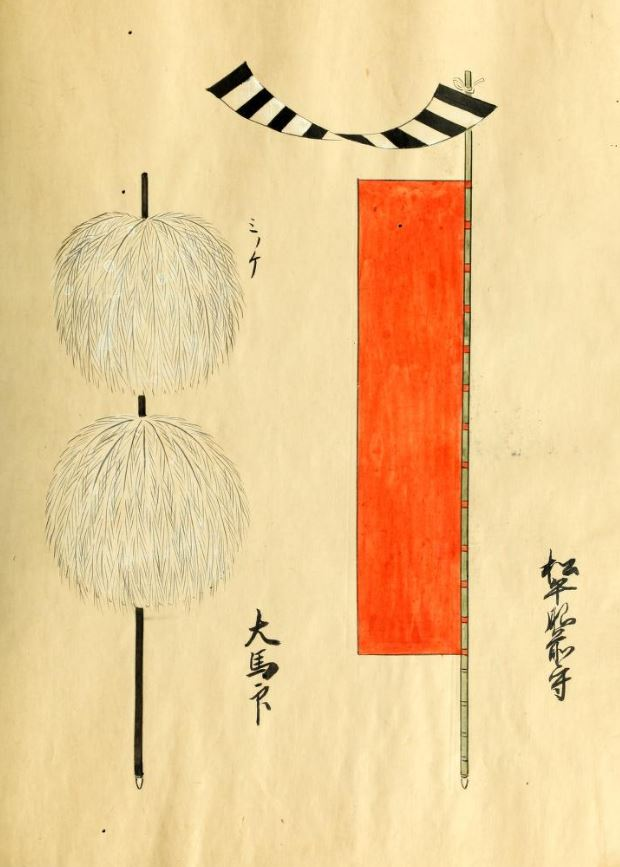
Nabeshima Tadanao

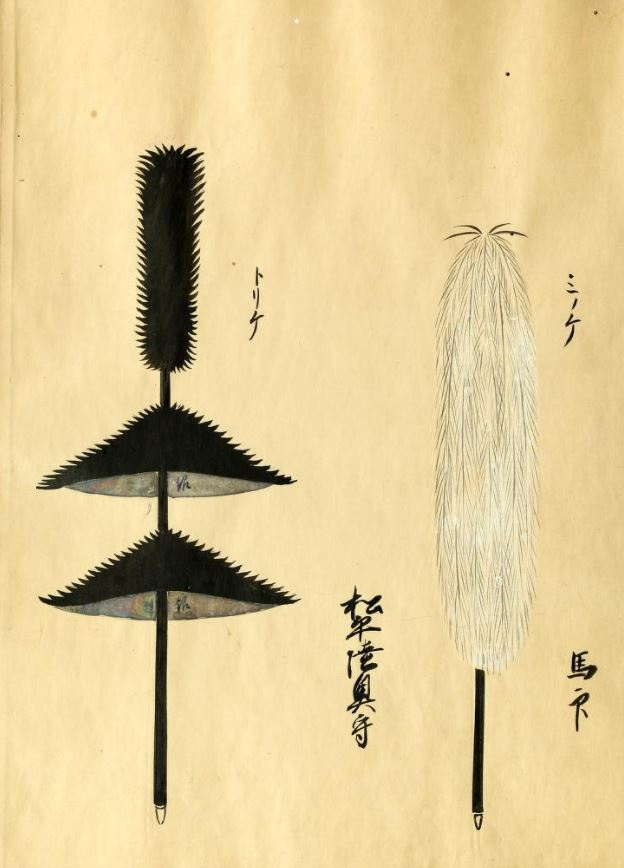
Nabeshima Tadanao

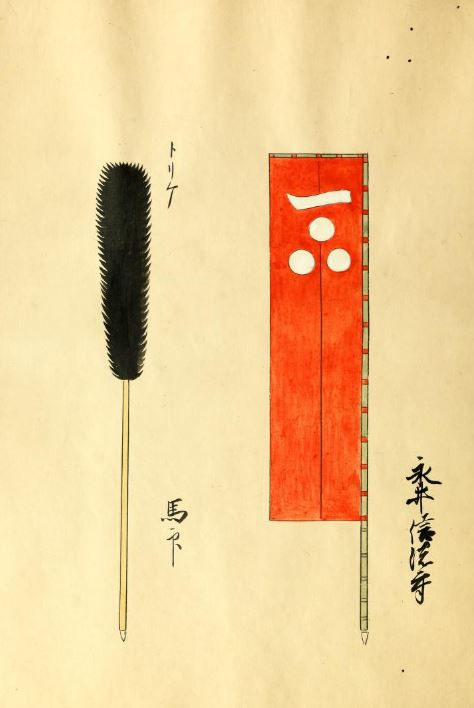
Nagai Naomasa

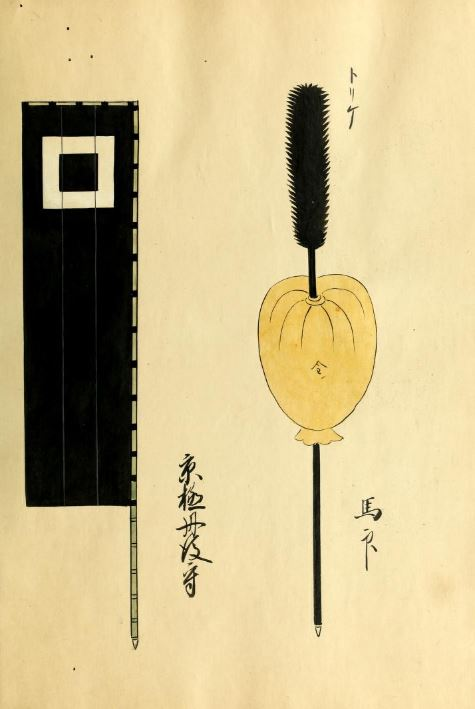
Nanbu Shigenao

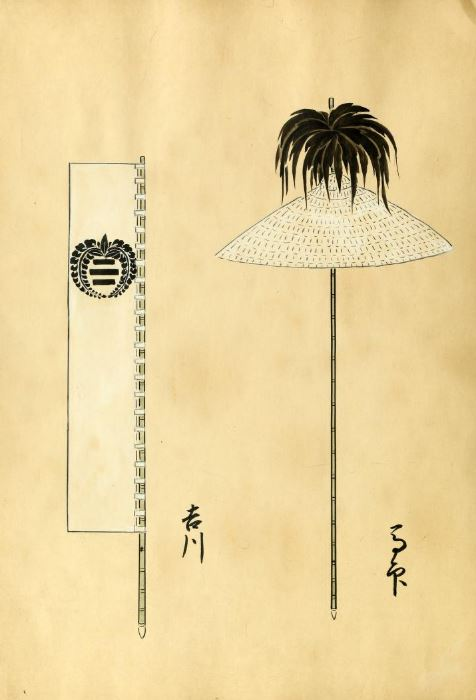
Natsuka Masaie

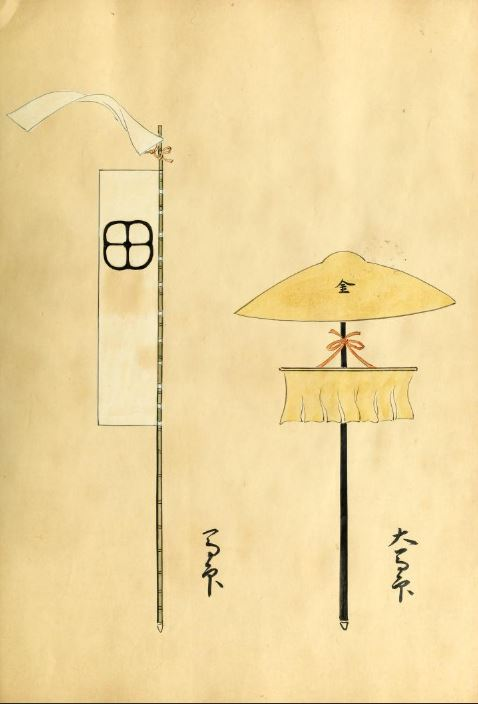
Natsuka Masaie

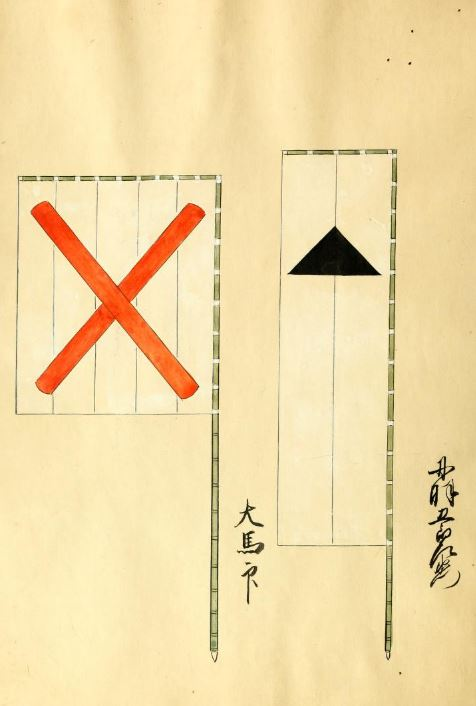
Niwa Nagahide

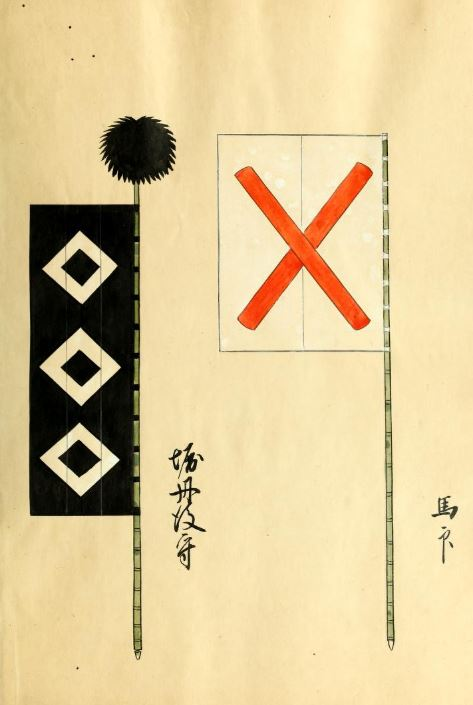
Niwa Nagahide

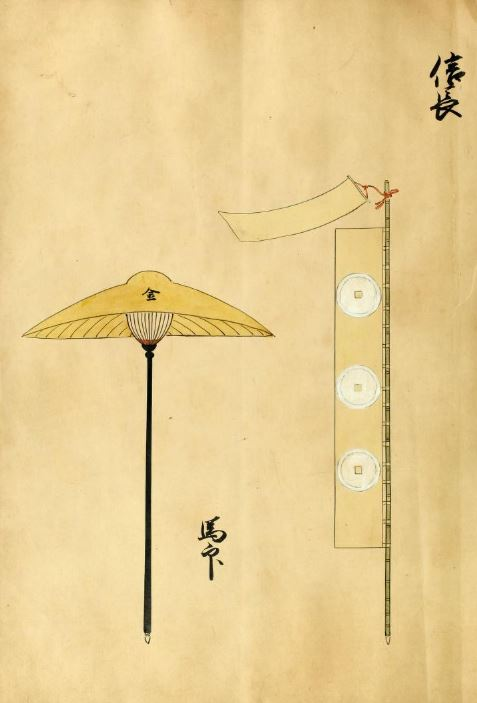
Oda Nobunaga

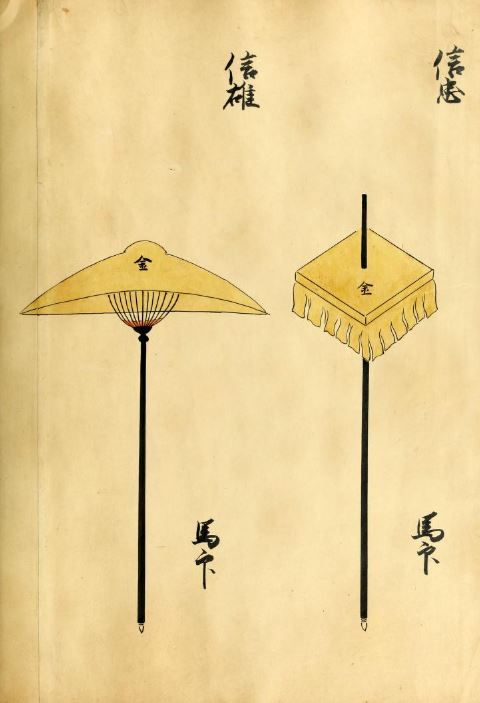
Oda Nobunaga

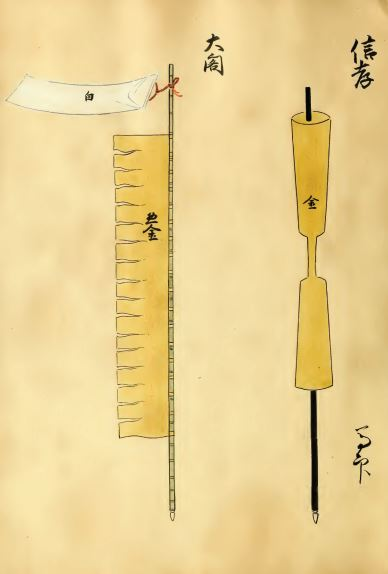
Oda Nobutaka

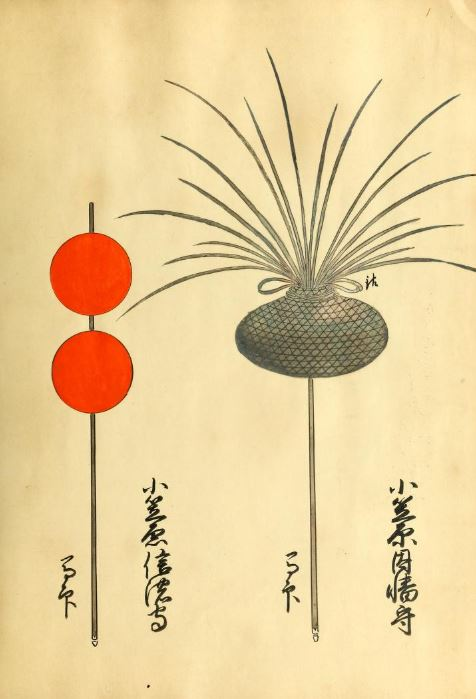
Ogasawara Nagatsugu

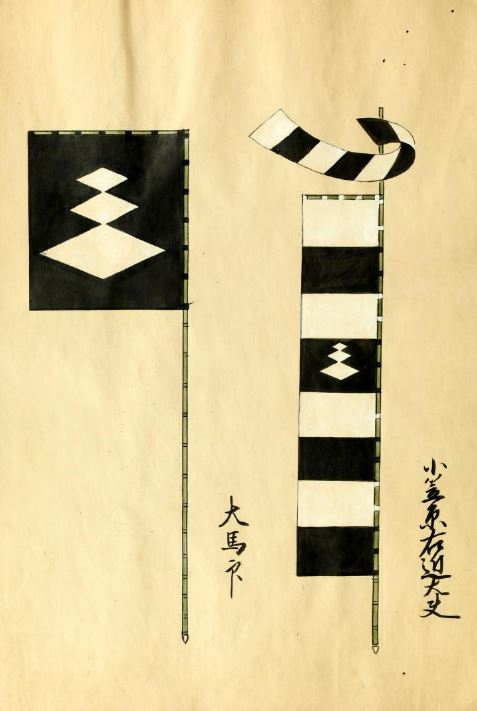
Ogasawara Tadazane

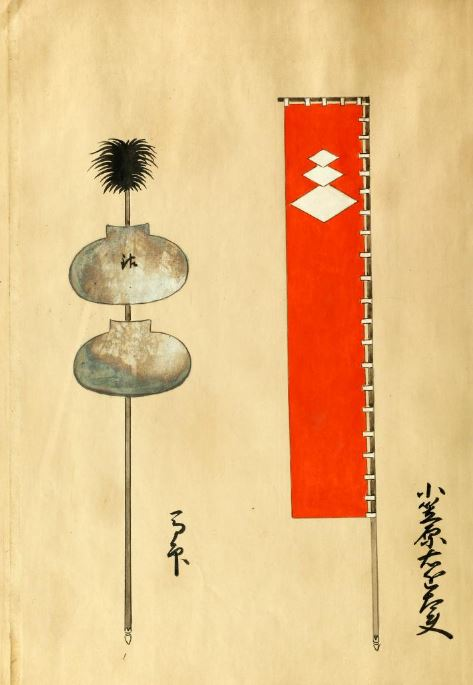
Ogasawara Tadazane

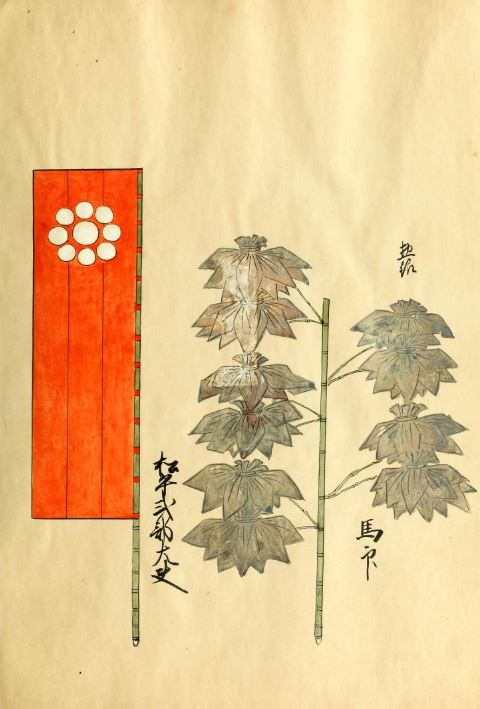
Ogasawara Tadazane

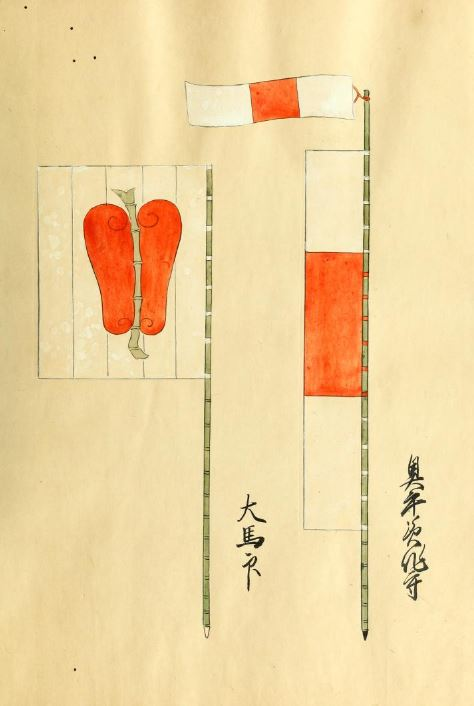
Okudaira Iemasa

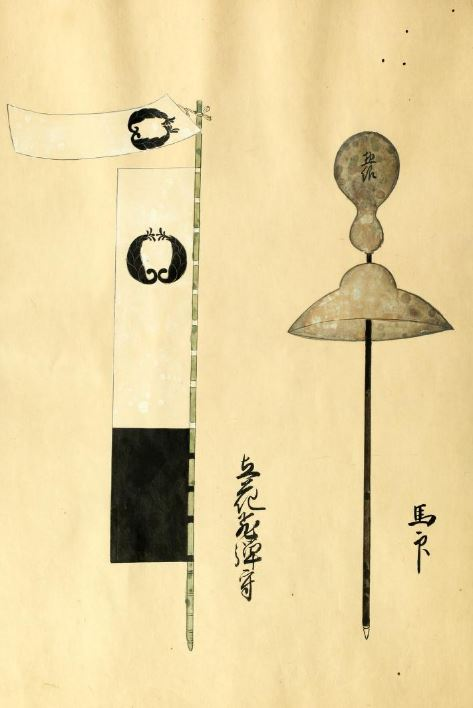
Okudaira Iemasa

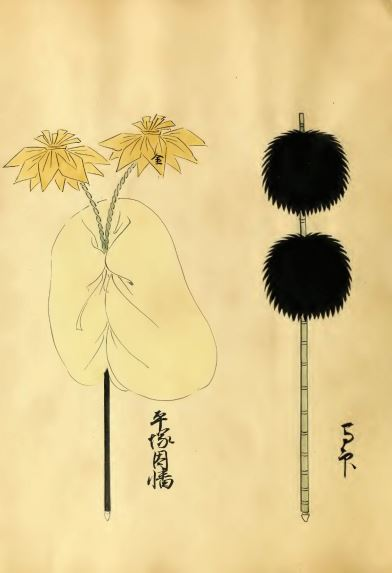
Ōtani Yoshitsugu

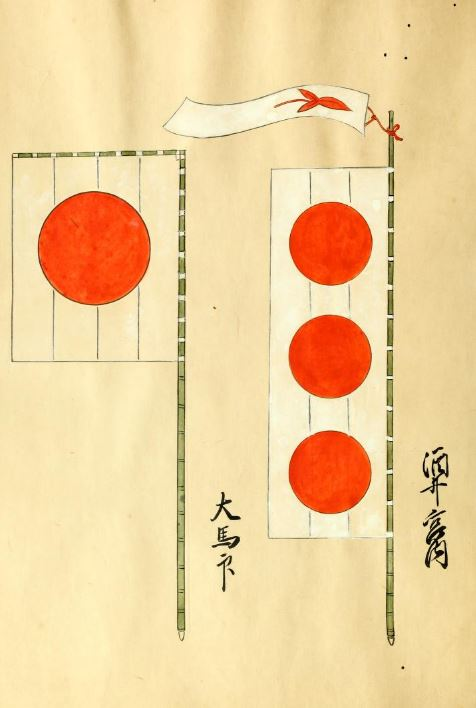
Sakai Ietsugu

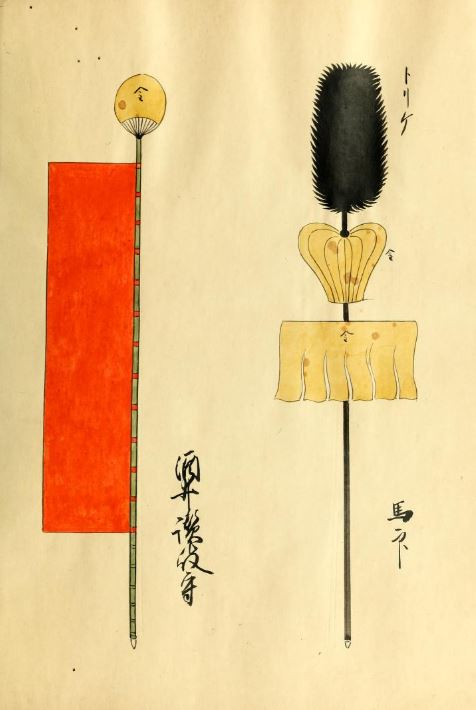
Sakai Ietsugu

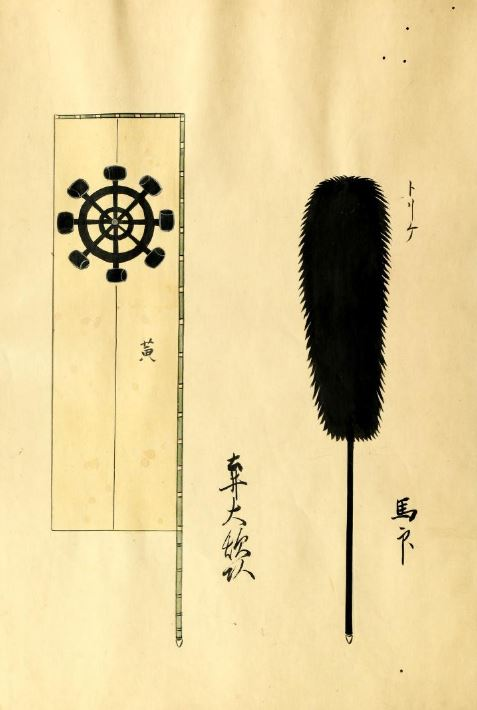
Sakai Tadakatsu

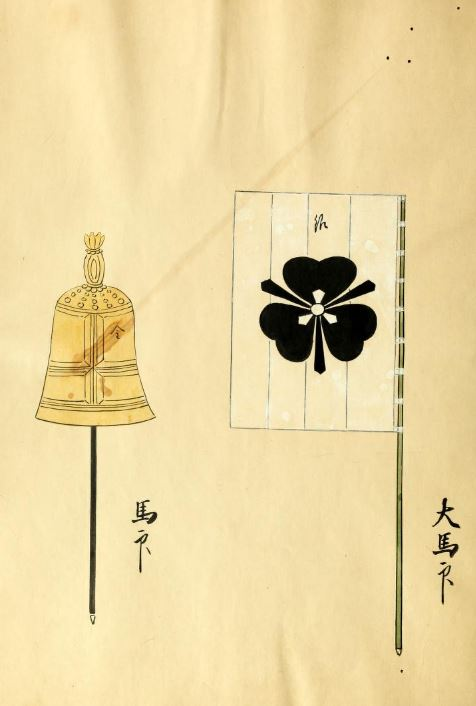
Sakai Tadakiyo

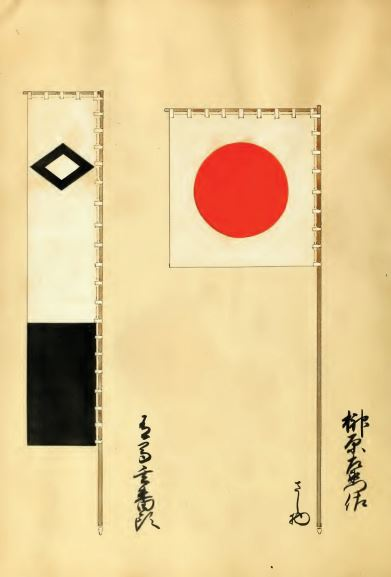
Sakikibara Motonao

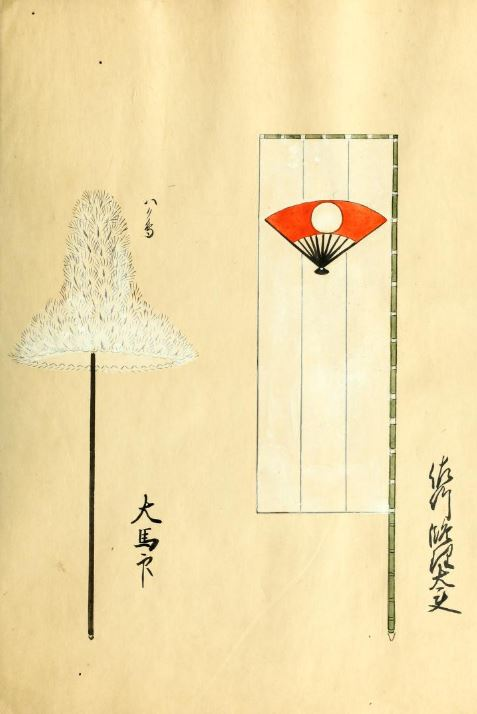
Satake Yoshinobu

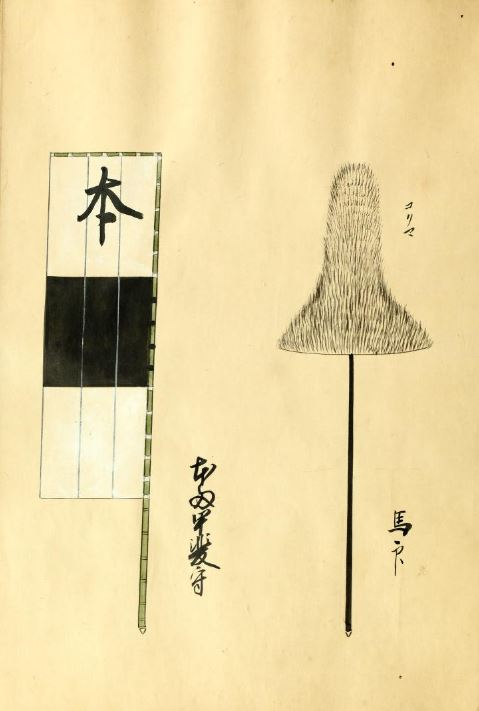
Satake Yoshinobu

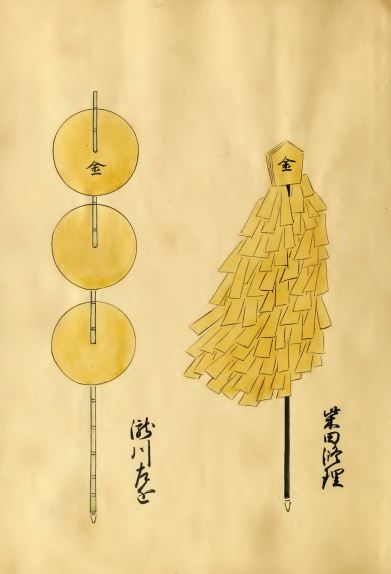
Shibata Katsuie

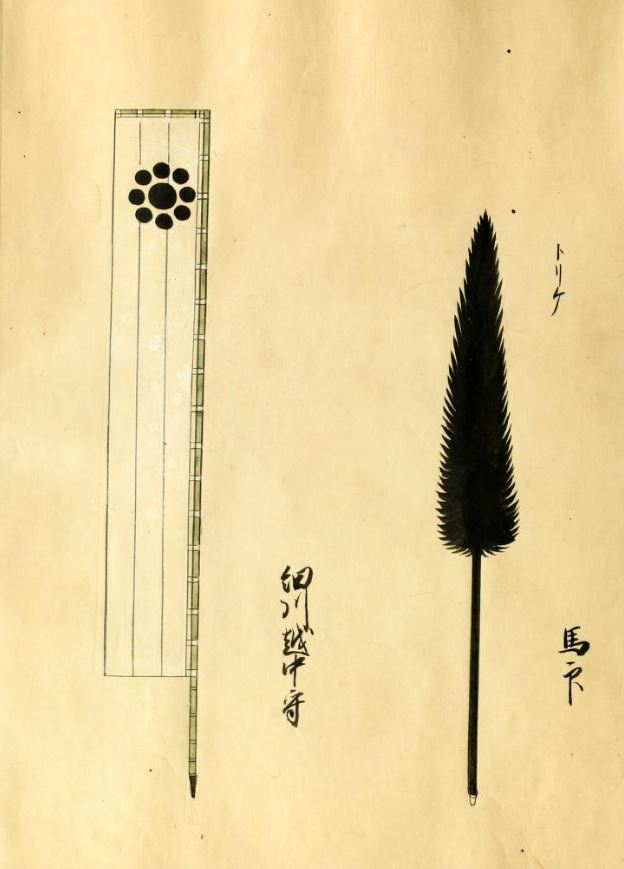
Shimazu Mitsuhisa

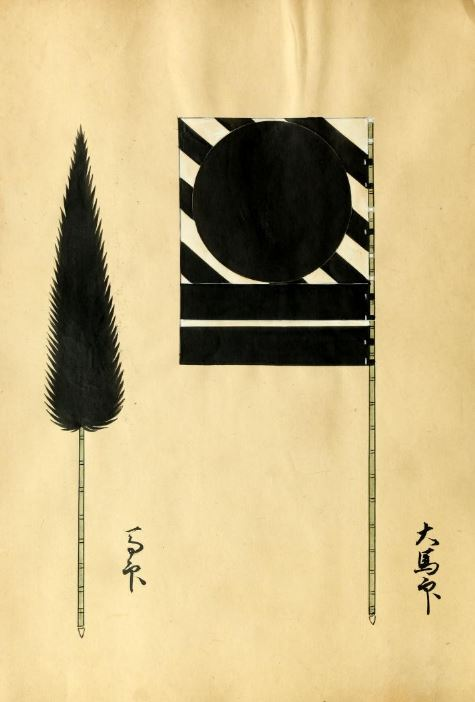
Shimazu Yoshihiro

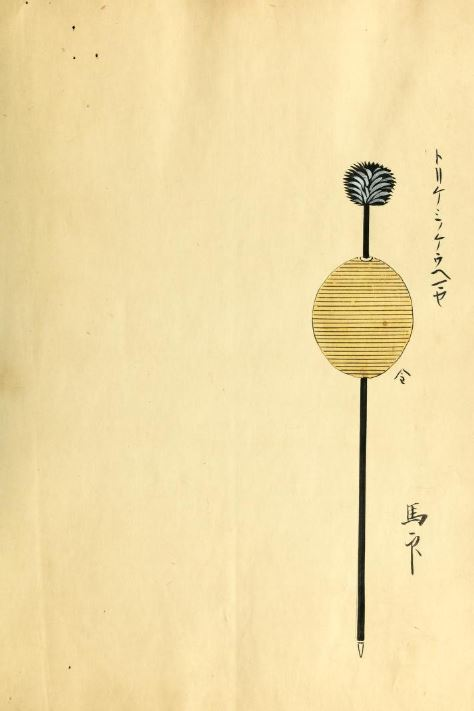
Sō Yoshitoshi

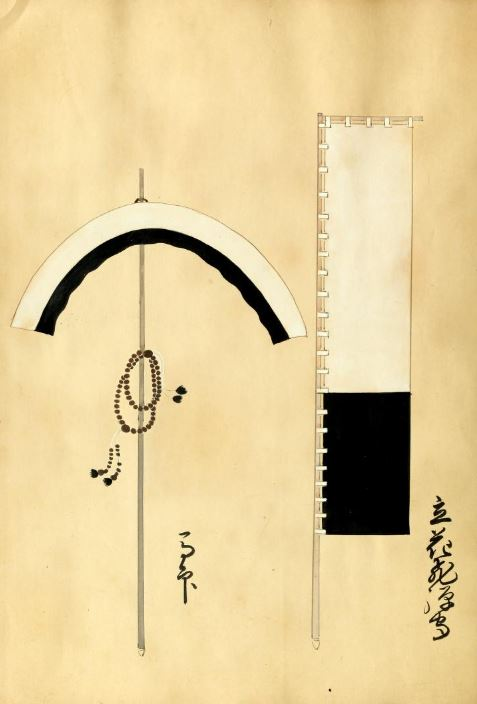
Tachibana Muneshige

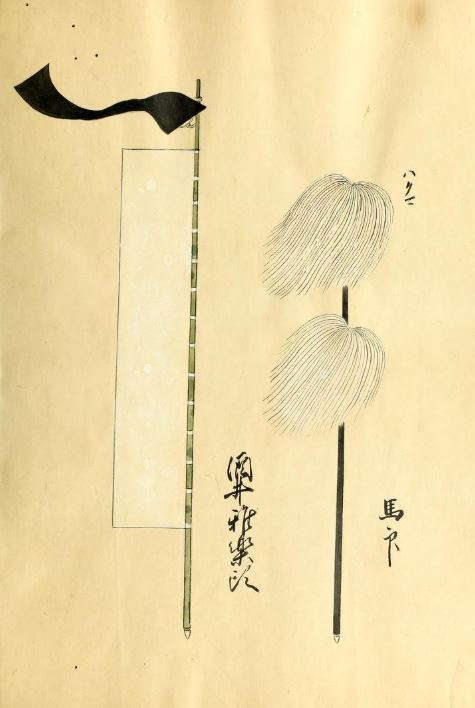
Tachibana Muneshige

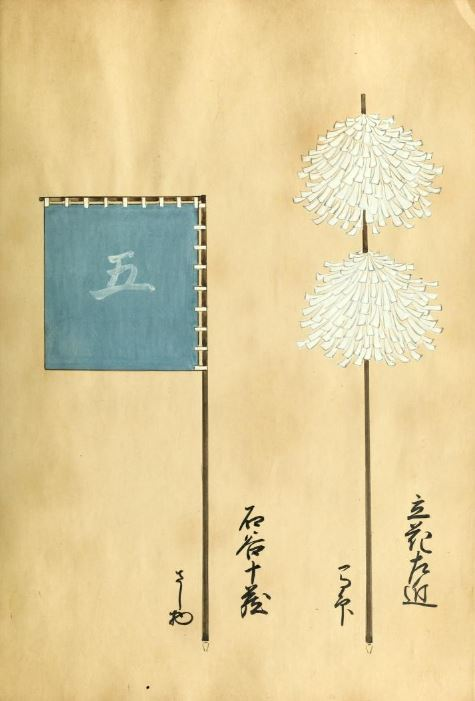
Tachibana Tadashige

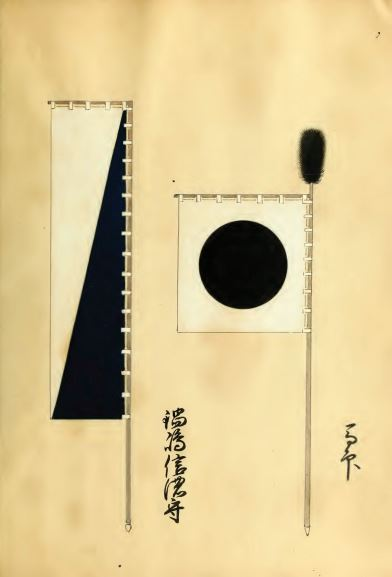
Terazawa Katataka

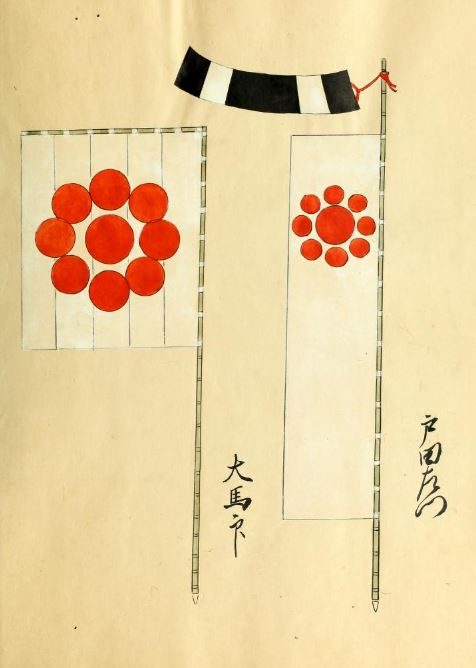
Toda Kazuaki

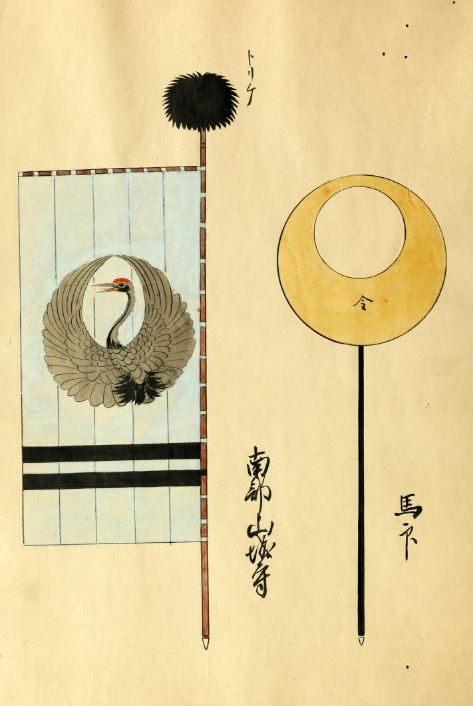
Toda Kazuaki

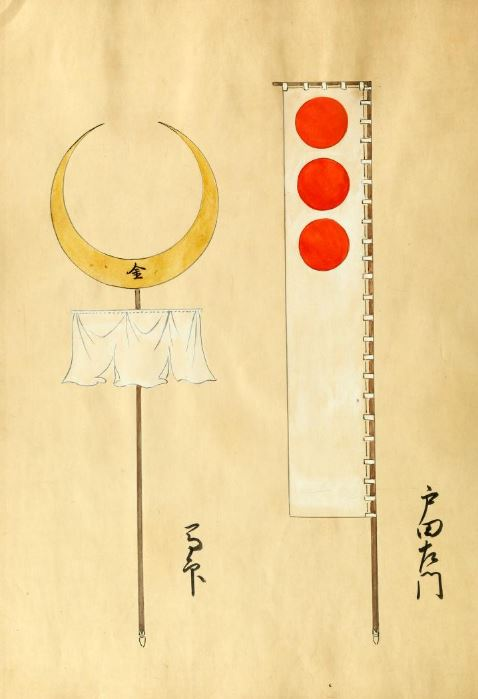
Toda Ujikane

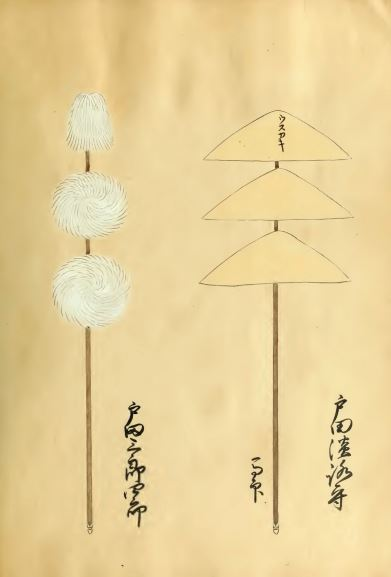
Toda Ujinobu

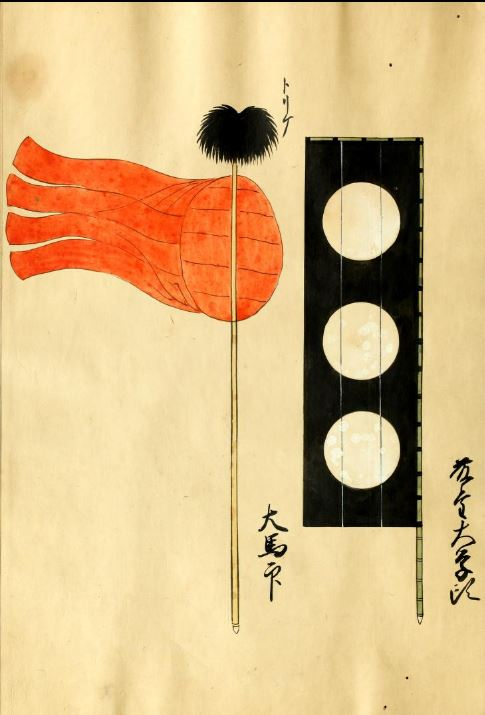
Tōdō Takatora

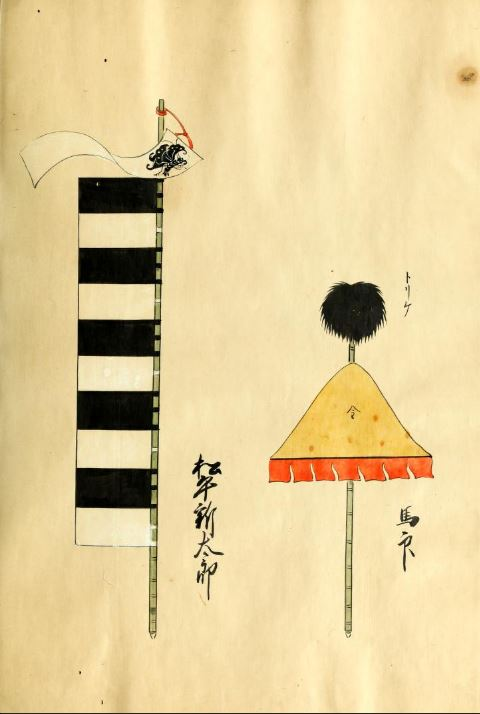
Tōdō Takatora

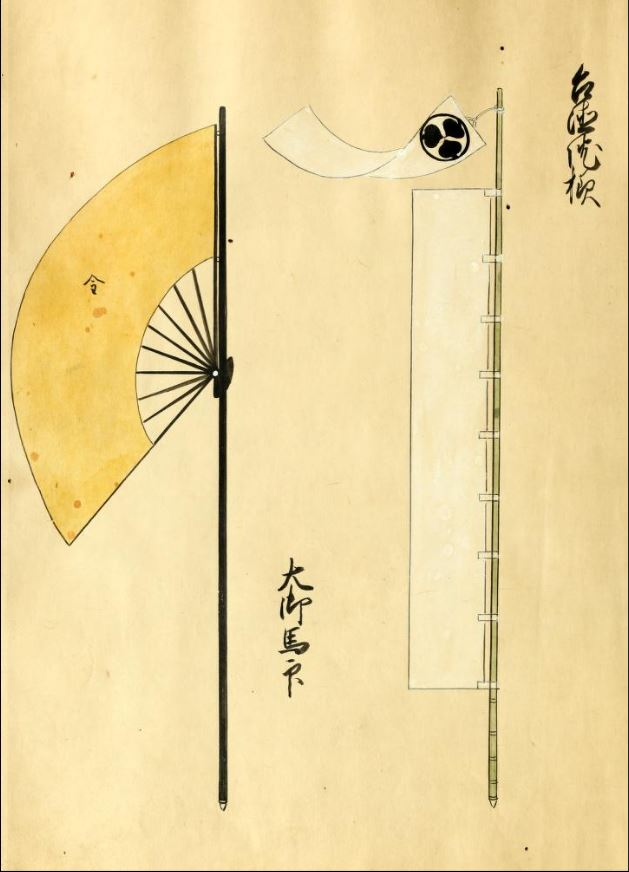
Tokugawa Hidetada

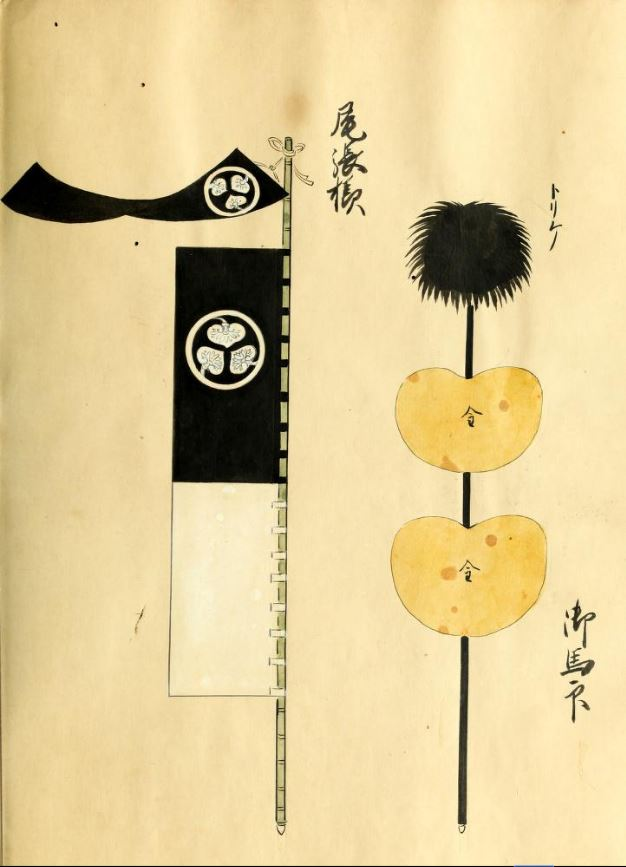
Tokugawa Hidetada

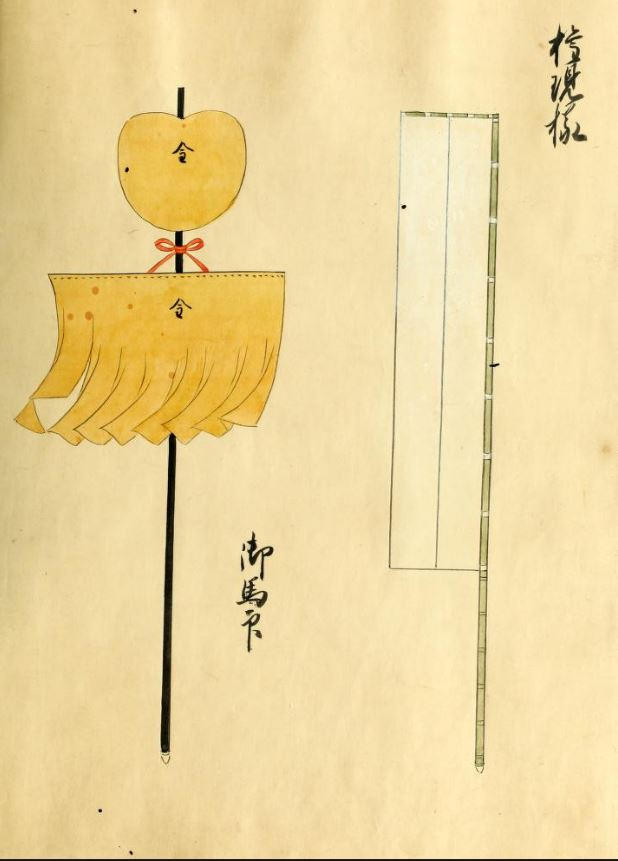
Tokugawa Ieyasu

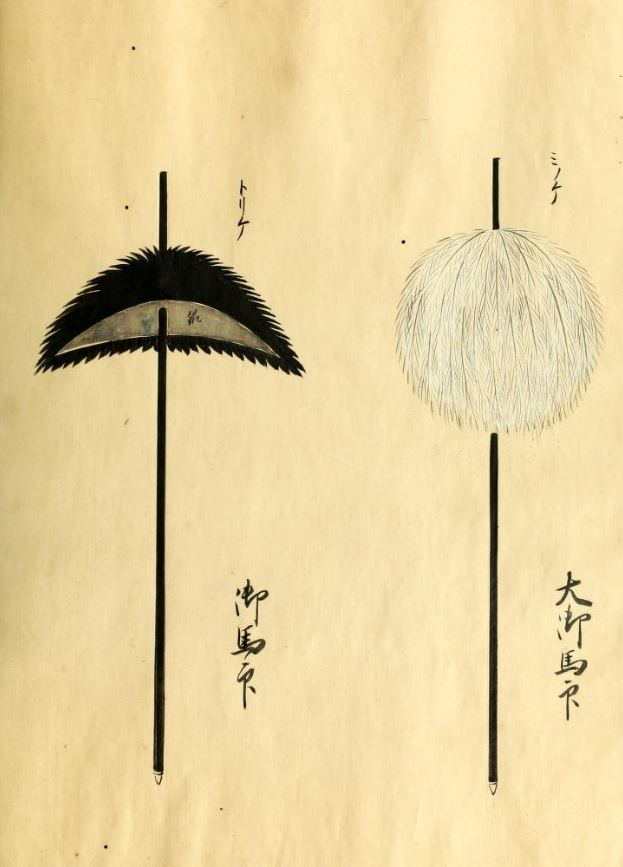
Tokugawa Yorifusa

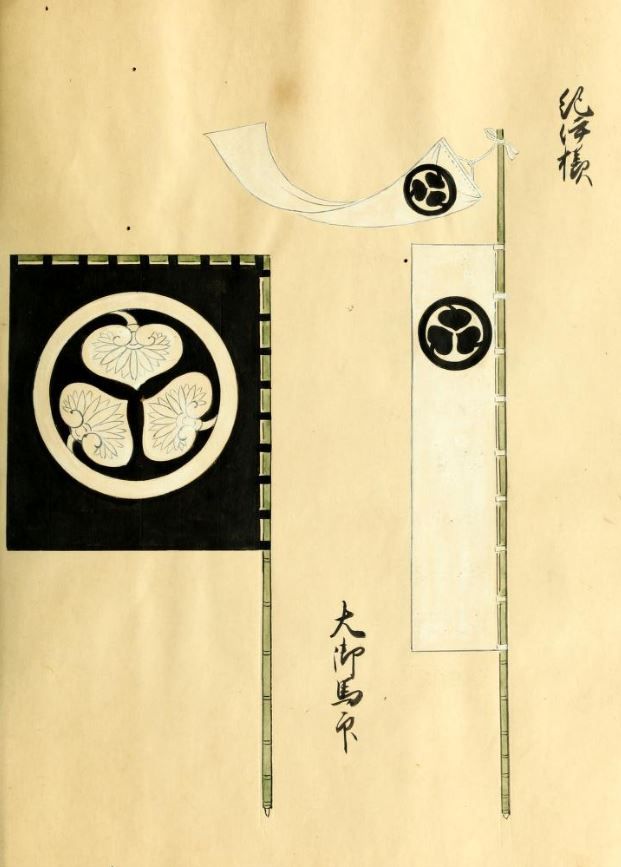
Tokugawa Yorinobu

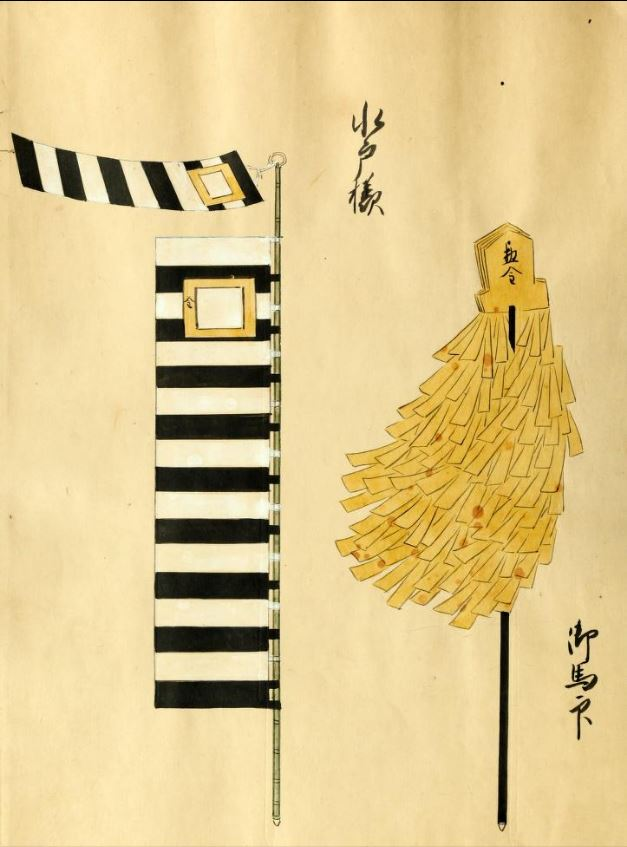
Tokugawa Yorinobu

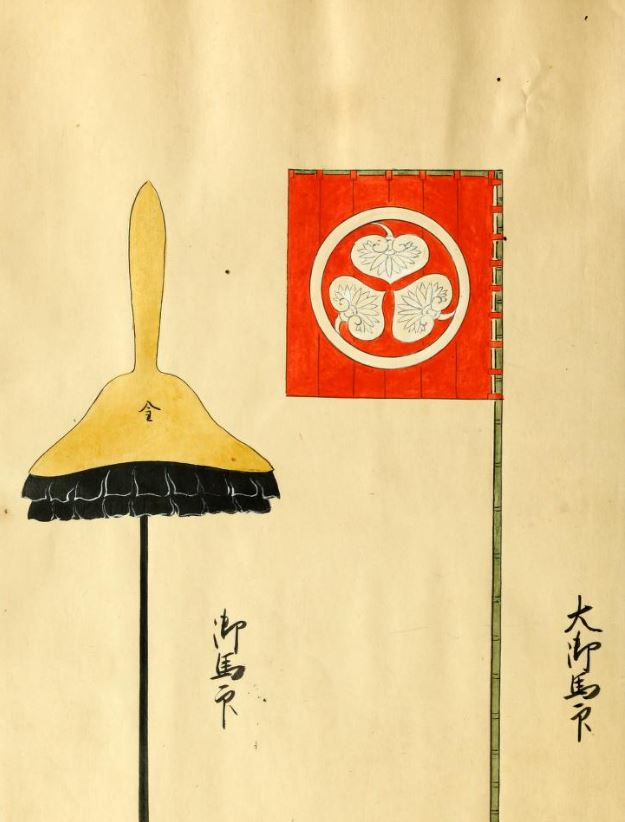
Tokugawa Yoshinao

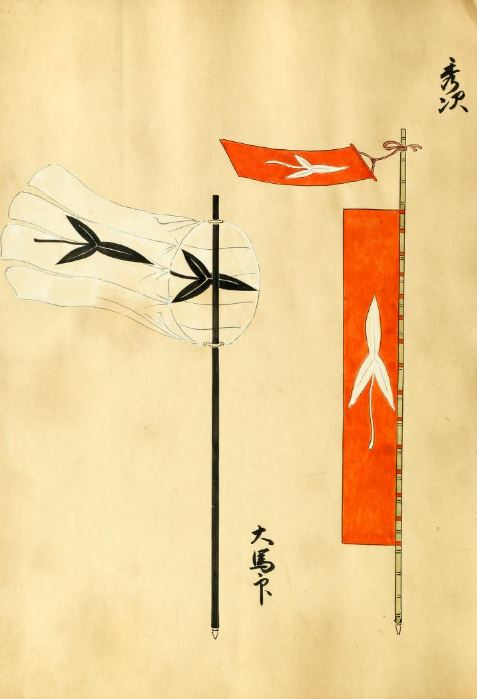
Toyotomi Hidetsugu

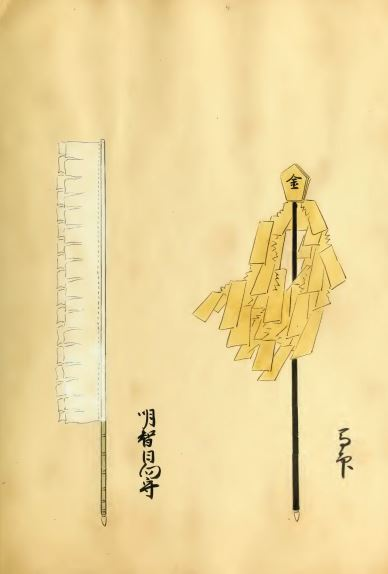
Toyotomi Hidetsugu

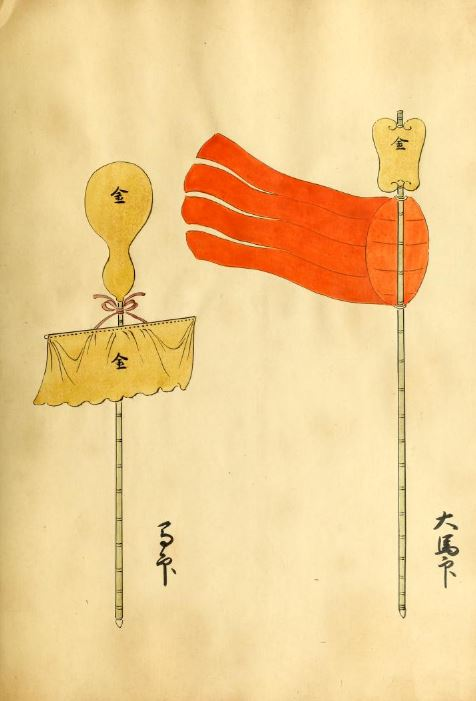
Toyotomi Hideyoshi

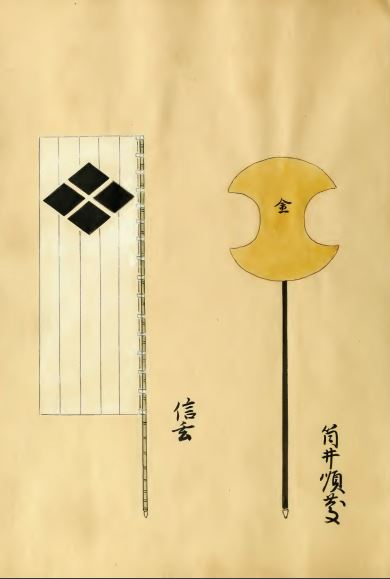
Tsutsui Junkei

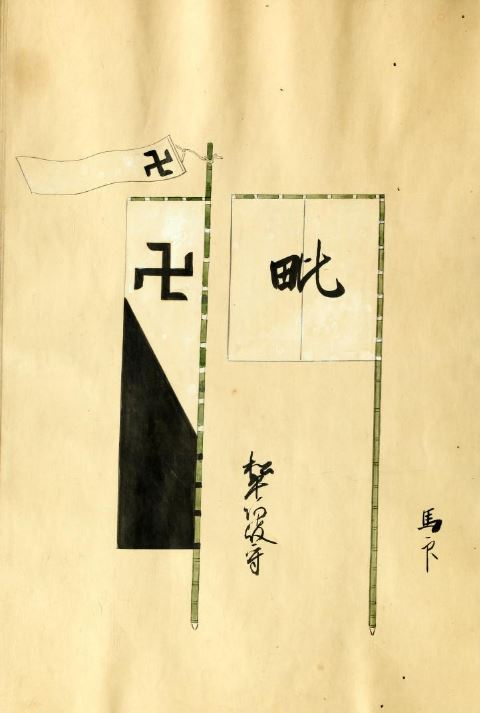
Uesugi Kagekatsu

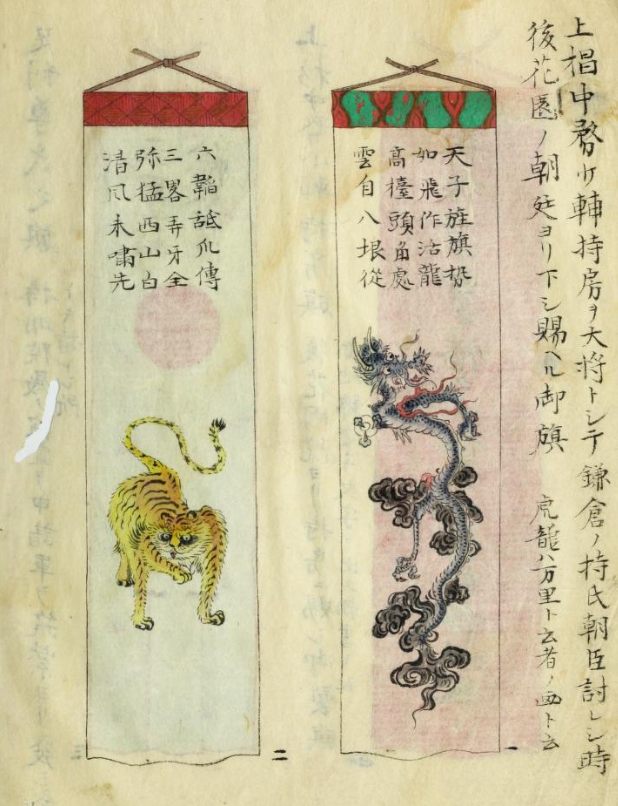
Uesugi Mochifusa

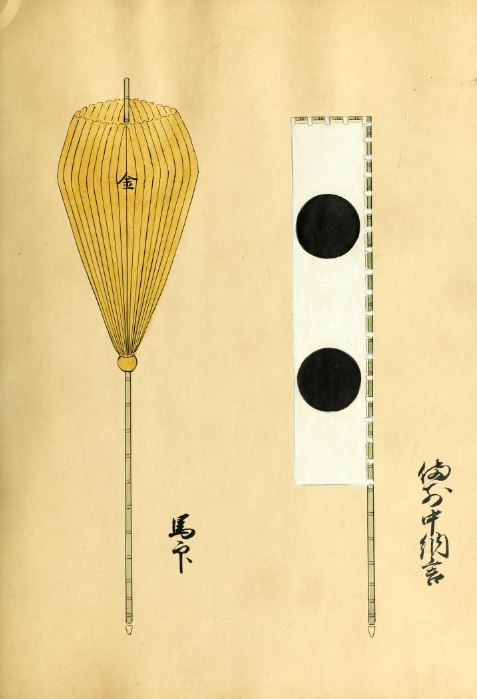
Ukita Hideie

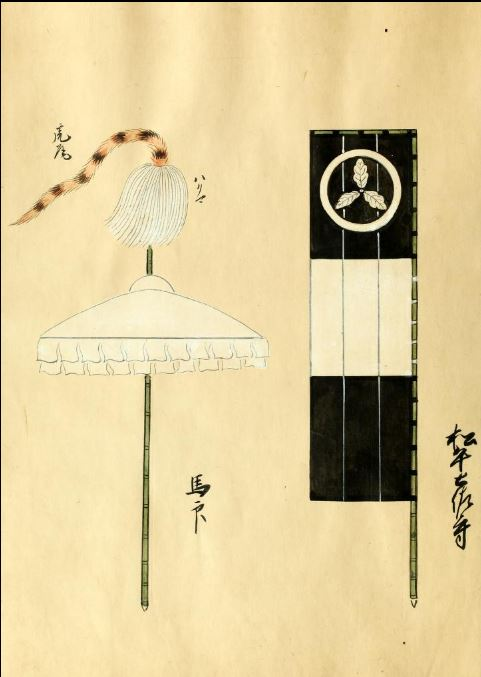
Yamauchi Kazutoyo

== Minorities ==
Flag	Date	Use	Description
	(1996) 1994–present	Flag of Mindan	Mindan is a pro-South organization of Zainichi Koreans. The pink flower surrounding the taegeuk is a hibiscus syriacus, the national flower of South Korea. The formal name of the society (Zainihon Daikanminkoku Mindan) is written in kanji in white, and the abbreviation (Mindan) is written in hangul in yellow. The blue field of the flag stands for clear sky and sea.
	1955–present	Flag of the Chochong	Chochong is a pro-North youth organization of Zainichi Koreans affiliated with the Chongryon. A red, white, and blue tricolor flag with the league's logo towards the hoist.
	1923–1945	Flag of National Levelers Association / Buraku Liberation League	Named the Crown of Thorns Flag (荊冠旗, Keikanki). Black represents a dark society with discriminations. Red represents blood.
	1945–present	Flag of Buraku Liberation League	The current Buraku Liberation League flag, with a white star representing hope.
	1973–present	Ainu flag	

== Cultural flags ==
Flag	Date	Use	Description
	1919–present	Flag of safety	Named the Green Cross (緑十字, Midori-jūji). Designed by Toshifumi Gamō as the symbol of the governmental "safety week" campaign. The cross represents philanthropism in Western sense, and the place where good deeds gather in Oriental sense. JIS Z9103-1986 designates the symbol as the safety indication sign.
	1953–present	Flag of industrial health	Announced by the Labour Standards Bureau, the Ministry of Labor of Japan (the current Ministry of Health, Labour and Welfare), over a public subscription.
	1965–present	Flag of safety and health	Designed by the Japan Industrial Safety & Health Association. These three flags are frequently flown on factories or construction sites.
	1887–present	Postal flag	The postal symbol, 〒, on a white field.

== Prefectural flags ==
Each modern prefecture has a unique flag, most often a bicolour geometric highly stylised design (mon), often incorporating the letters of Japanese writing system and resembling company logos. A distinct feature of these flags is that they use a palette of colours not usually found in flags, including orange, purple, aquamarine and brown.

Some prefectures also have alternative official flags called "symbol flags" (シンボル旗). They may be used on less formal occasions. Famous symbol flags include the one used in Tokyo.

Flag	Prefecture	Geocode
	Aichi	JP-23
	Akita	JP-05
	Aomori	JP-02
	Chiba	JP-12
	Ehime	JP-38
	Fukui	JP-18
	Fukuoka	JP-40
	Fukushima	JP-07
	Gifu	JP-21
	Gunma	JP-10
	Hiroshima	JP-34
	Hokkaido	JP-01
	Hyōgo	JP-28
	Ibaraki	JP-08
	Ishikawa	JP-17
	Iwate	JP-03
	Kagawa	JP-37
	Kagoshima	JP-46
	Kanagawa	JP-14
	Kōchi	JP-39
	Kumamoto	JP-43
	Kyoto	JP-26
	Mie	JP-24
	Miyagi	JP-04
	Miyazaki	JP-45
	Nagano	JP-20
	Nagasaki	JP-42
	Nara	JP-29
	Niigata	JP-15
	Ōita	JP-44
	Okayama	JP-33
	Okinawa	JP-47
	Ōsaka	JP-27
	Saga	JP-41
	Saitama	JP-11
	Shiga	JP-25
	Shimane	JP-32
	Shizuoka	JP-22
	Tochigi	JP-09
	Tokushima	JP-36
	Tokyo	JP-13
	Tottori	JP-31
	Toyama	JP-16
	Wakayama	JP-30
	Yamagata	JP-06
	Yamaguchi	JP-35
	Yamanashi	JP-19

== Municipal flags ==
Most municipalities have unique flags. Like prefectural flags, most of them are with a bicolour geometric highly stylized symbol, often incorporating Japanese characters.

== Political flags ==
Flag	Date	Use	Description
Current
	2017–present	Tomin First no Kai	
	1995–present	Ishin Seito Shimpu	
	1982–present	National Socialist Japanese Workers' Party	
	1972–present	Japanese Communist Party	
	1970–present	Kariyushi Club (Ryukyu Independence Movement)	
	1955–present	Liberal Democratic Party	
	1923–1942; 1946–present	Rikken Yoseikai ^{ja}	
Former
	2005–2013	People's New Party	
	1960–1994	Democratic Socialist Party	
	1945–1996	Japan Socialist Party	
	1936–1944	Tōhōkai	
Other
	1936	The Righteous Army	The four characters reading "Revere the Emperor, Destroy the Traitors" (尊皇討奸) are placed in the corners of a standard Japanese flag.

== See also ==
- Vexillology
- Vexillological symbol
- Glossary of vexillology
- Civil flag
- Ensign (flag)
- Flag families
- Maritime flag
- National flag
- National coat of arms
- National emblem
- National seal
- National symbol
- State flag
- Galleries and lists:
  - Flags of Europe
  - Gallery of sovereign state flags
  - Gallery of flags of dependent territories
  - Lists of flags
  - List of flags by design
  - List of national flags by design
  - List of national flags of sovereign states
  - List of United Kingdom flags
  - List of Antarctic flags
  - List of flags by color combination
  - List of sovereign states by date of current flag adoption
  - Gallery pages of flags of country subdivisions
