= Bikki Sunazawa =

Ainu Japanese sculptor (1931–1989)

- 砂澤ビッキ
- Born: Hisao Sunazawa; 6 March 1931; Asahikawa, Hokkaido, Japan
- Died: 25 January 1989 (aged 57); Sapporo, Hokkaido, Japan
- Education: Self-taught
- Known for: Sculpture, woodcarving, drawing

Bikki Sunazawa (also Bikky Sunazawa, Hisao Sunazawa) (砂澤ビッキ) (March 6, 1931 – January 25, 1989) was a Japanese self-taught woodcarver, painter, artist and sculptor of Ainu origin. Sunazawa is respected for helping make the Ainu culture known to the world through his works performed in the Ainu manner. Sunazawa is also known for designing the Ainu flag in 1971. His son Oki, an Ainu Japanese musician, applies the same approach to music.

== Biography ==
=== Early years ===
He was born as Hisao Sunazawa in 1931 to parents Koa-kanno and Peramonkoro Sunazawa who were prominent figures in the movement for Ainu land and civil rights. "Bikki" was a nickname from his boyhood. His mother Peramonkoro was also one of the most respected Japan's textile artists of the twentieth century. In his late teens, Sunazawa worked with his family and other people to establish a new settlement. He left Hokkaido for Tokyo at the age of 21 to become involved with Japan's avant-garde art world of the 1950s and 1960s. He was later recognized as a leading sculptor in Japanese post-war art. By the 1970s, he returned to Hokkaido and was heavily involved in the Ainu liberation movement.

=== Later years ===
Having to disguise his Ainu art because of the ban imposed by the Japanese in the early twentieth century, Sunazawa devoted his life to the defense of the Ainu culture. He was one of the first initiators of establishing connections with the Native American tribes, through the exhibition of some of his sculptures in British Columbia where he settled for a time. As his work became more widely known, he continued to use his art to disseminate Ainu culture via explanations of his creations, interviews, and relations within the artistic community.

As a sign of respect, two Japanese amateur astronomers, Kin Endate and Kazuro Watanabe, gave his name to the minor planet 5372 that they discovered on November 29, 1987.

=== Death ===
Bikki Sunazawa died on January 25, 1989, from bone marrow cancer in the Sapporo Aiiku Hospital. The Sunazawa's sculptures are still on display, and his studio "Sun More" is open to the public at Otoineppu, near the Teshio River in Hokkaido.

== Legacy ==
In 2004, the National Museum of Natural History, Smithsonian Institution published a monograph of his life and work, From the Playground of the Gods: The Life and Art of Bikky Sunazawa. A 2022–23 retrospective exhibition of his work was held at the Hokkaido Museum of Art.
