= Ainu flag =

Flag designed by Bikki Sunazawa

- Vector rendering of an interpretation uploaded to Flags of the World
- Use: Other
- Adopted: 1973
- Design: Blue field with white figure and red arrow
- Designed by: Bikki Sunazawa

An Ainu flag was designed by Bikki Sunazawa, a Japanese sculptor of Ainu ancestry.

Upon a repeated request from his friend, Bikki Sunazawa eventually designed the flag in 1973 – although he distanced himself from political activism seeking government support. Nevertheless, an Ainu group displayed the flag when they marched at a May Day celebration in Sapporo in the same year. On rare occasions, it is still seen at Ainu functions.

In 2020 Bikki's son Jin Sunazawa claimed copyright ownership and requested disuse of the flag.

== Description ==
The flag consists of a cerulean blue field standing for sky and sea, a white figure standing for snow, and a red arrow flying beneath Hokkaido's sky. The arrow is red because of surku, the aconite poison used in traditional hunting, a way of life that was banned by the Japanese. The white figure, commonly known as Bikki mon'yō, was not a traditional Ainu motif but Bikki's personal invention.
