= Happi =

Traditional tube-sleeved Japanese coat

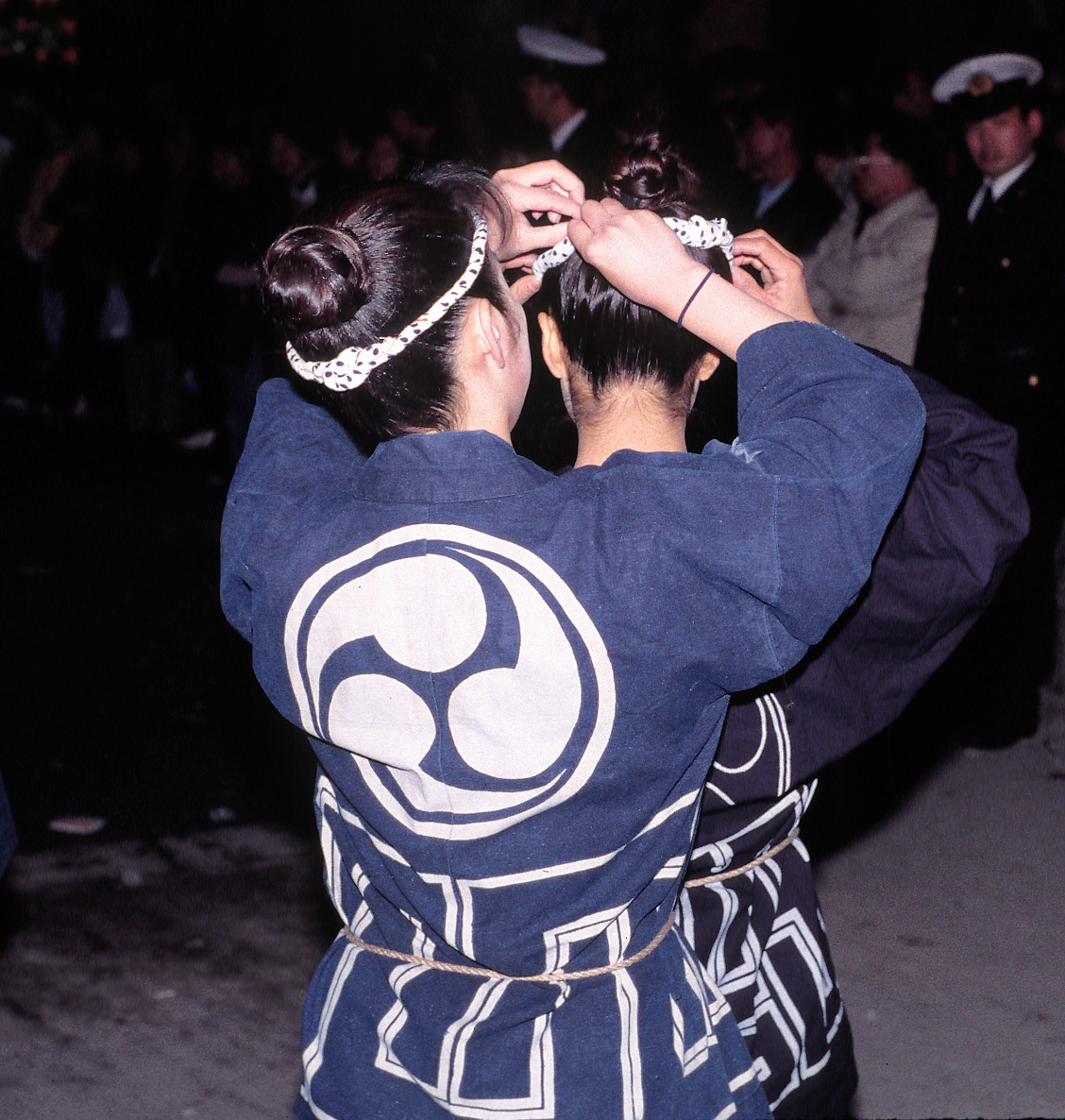
Women at a festival wearing a happi

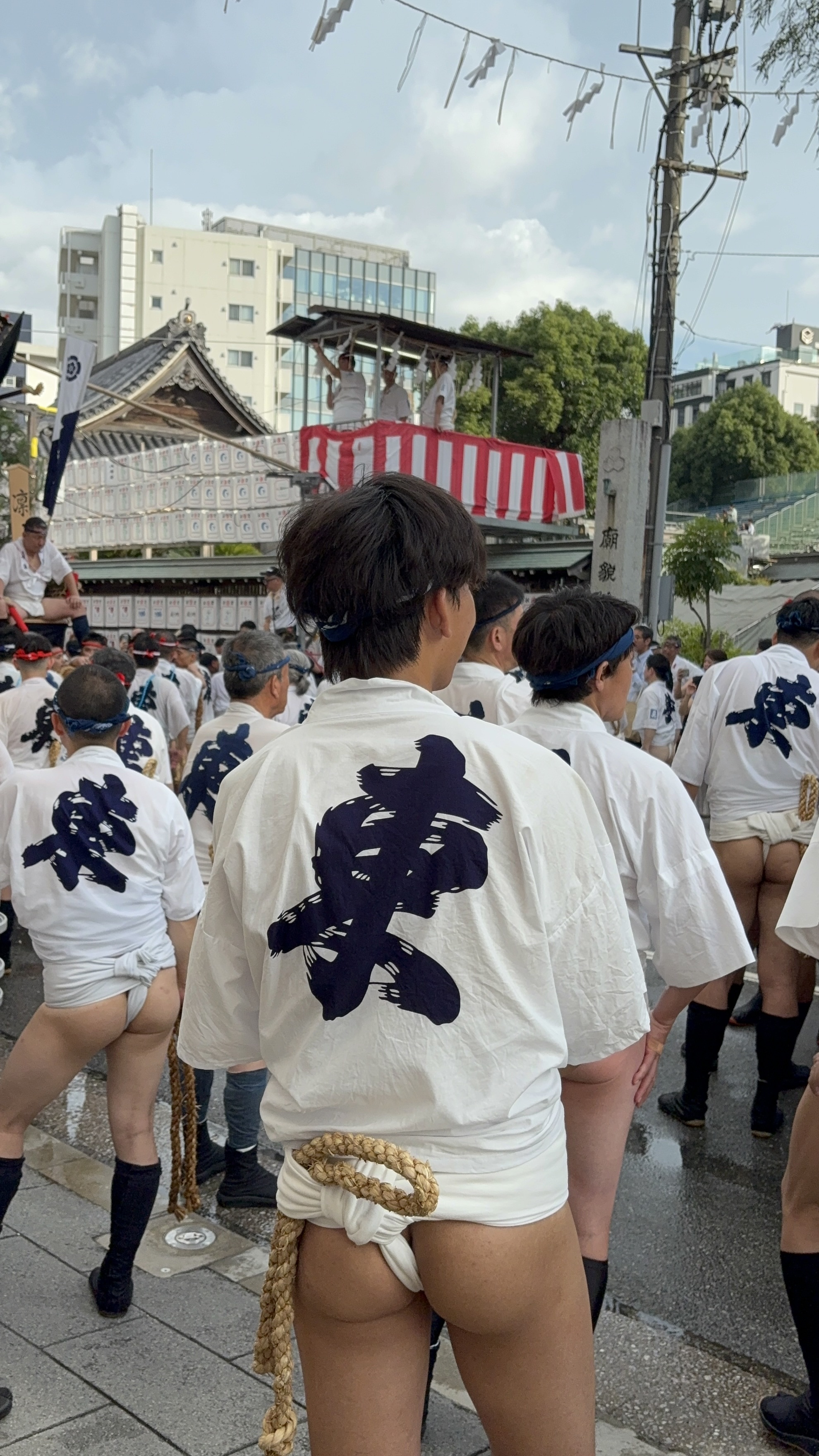
Men in Hakata Gion Yamakasa wearing a happi

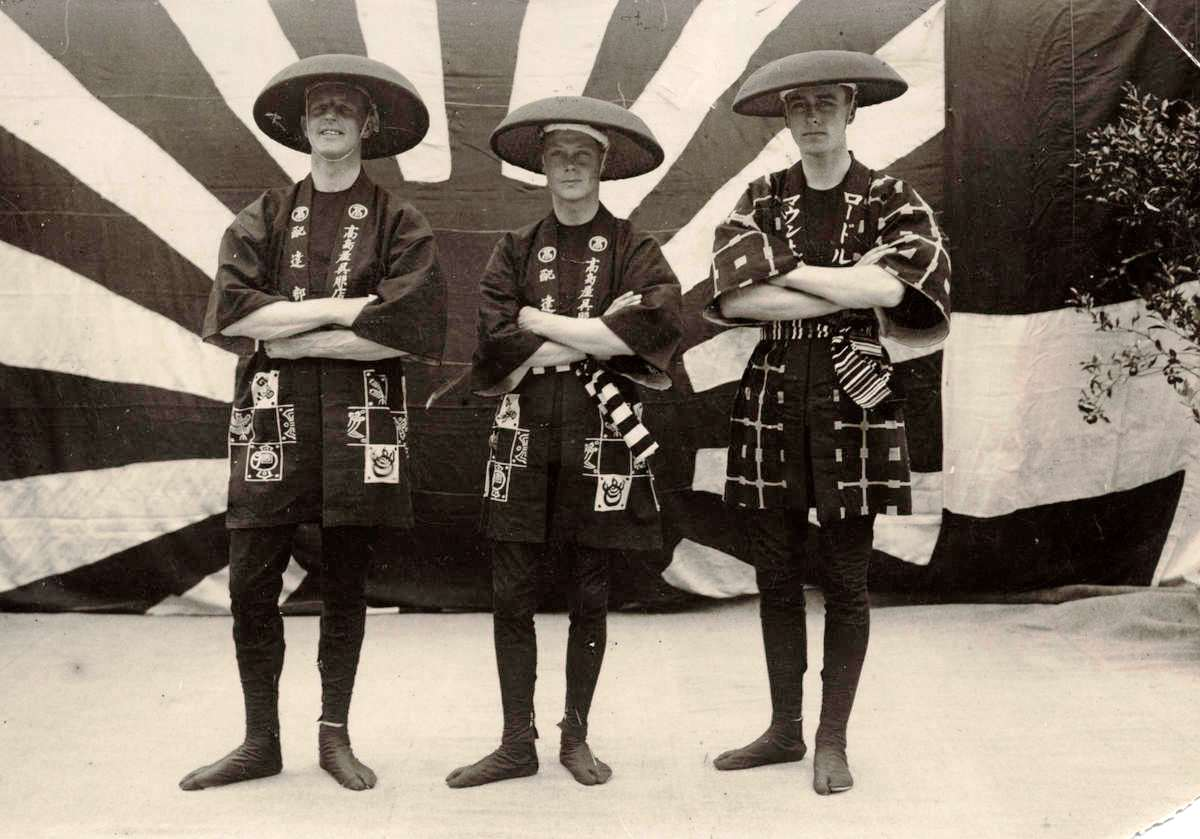
Edward Dudley Metcalfe (left), Edward, Prince of Wales (centre), later Edward VIII of the United Kingdom and Lord Mountbatten (right), wearing a happi

A happi (法被/半被) is a traditional tube-sleeved Japanese coat, usually worn only during festivals. Happi typically feature symbols and/or text on the lapels, with a larger design on the back of the coat, typically the name or the festival or the participating association; the kanji for 'festival' (祭り, matsuri) may also be present.

Originally worn for display of the mon, or family emblem, happi were worn by house servants as a uniform. Firefighters also wore happi coats, with the crest on the back of the coat displaying the group with which they were associated; these were distinct from the hikeshi sashiko banten (lit. 'embroidered fireman's jacket') also worn by firefighters, constructed from heavily-quilted cotton layers designed to hold a large quantity of water and thus protect the wearer. In the Edo period, firefighters were paid not only for actual firefighting activity but also for promptness and presence at the scene of a fire. Thus, wearing conspicuous happi and dancing on intact roofs near fires with matoi was essential for them.

In English, the term happi is most often translated as "happi coat" or "happy coat". Happi are typically blue, with designs in red, black, and white, though variations with a number of different colours are also seen in modern day Japan. Modern happi coats may be made of cotton or polyester fabrics.
