= Kawachi ondo =

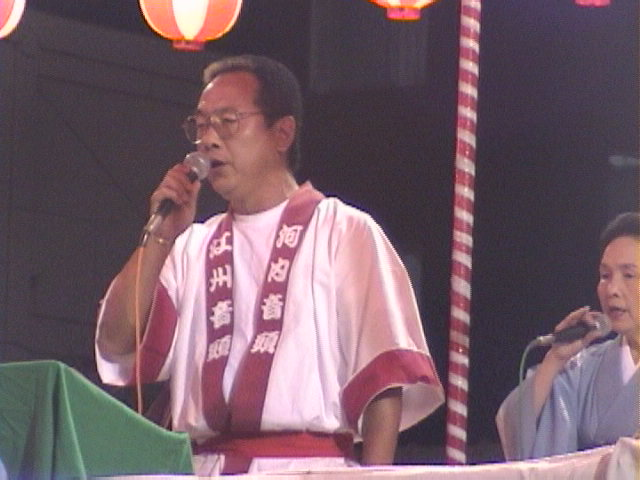
Bon odori singer: the characters on his happi coat read Gōshū Ondo and Kawachi Ondo.

Kawachi Ondo (河内音頭) is a kind of Japanese folk song that originates from Yao City in the old Kawachi region of Japan, now part of modern-day Osaka Prefecture. This song's style and melody are said to have evolved from another folk song called Gōshū Ondo from Shiga Prefecture, known as Goshu in earlier days. Kawachi Ondo accompanies the Bon dance (also known as Bon Odori) in the Osaka/Kawachi region of Japan, however, this song has recently grown in popularity and is often played at other major Bon dances, even in Tokyo. Emmanuelle Loubet writes that Kawachi Ondo has long had a grassroots vitality and that the Kawachi area's association with the working class, yakuza, street fights, rough language, and Buraku communities has likely contributed to the form's close links to community practice rather than being "pasteuriz[ed] for consumption by the masses."

== Form ==
"Kawachi Ondo" is a fluid form of traditional folk music. It has a common melody and a returning chorus, but the lyric is fluid. This folk tune is used to tell epic tales, usually about historic people, lore, and/or geography, even yakuza. It can be used to talk about current events, and expert singers are able to improvise lyrics on the spot, as well as sing words directly from a newspaper. There is varying instrumentation for Kawachi Ondo, though the staples are always a taiko drum and the shamisen. Sometimes modern instruments are used in the Kawachi Ondo ensemble, such as electric guitars and electric basses.

== Singers ==
It is considered an art to be able to put lyric to Kawachi Ondo. It takes years of observation and study to become a singer. Expert singers, known as ondotori, become renowned in the area or in parts of Japan where Kawachi Ondo is famous. There is a festival called Kawachi Ondo Matsuri in Yao City, the birthplace of Kawachi Ondo. The festival celebrates the song, and a massive Bon Odori is held where many famous singers go and perform. The most famous singer of Kawachi Ondo is Kawachiya Kikusuimaru of Yao City. Koishimaru Izutsuya's singing is featured on a UNESCO/Smithsonian Folkways recording with extensive liner notes and transcriptions of his live performance.

A Kawachi Ondo singer was traditionally accompanied by one taiko player (on an chudaiko or odaiko) and a shamisen player. Since the 1970s, the shamisen has been increasingly replaced by an electric guitar player.

== Dance ==
There are many ways to dance to Kawachi Ondo. The most famous dance is called "mamekachi". The dance proceeds clockwise around the yagura, though a few steps go in the opposite direction, and it is marked by a succession of three claps before the dance sequence begins again. It may be the most standard of Kawachi Ondo dances, but even this dance will vary slightly from region to region.

There is an alternate dance called "teodori", literally, "hand dance". Most of the movement is in the hands. In contrast, the mamekachi involves a lot of foot work. The teodori dance proceeds counter-clockwise around the yagura and the dancers clap twice before beginning the dance sequence anew. Often to change things, dancers will switch between the mamekachi and teodori dances halfway through a Kawachi Ondo performance, as performances can last up to 30 minutes or so.

Like the song Kawachi Ondo itself, the dance is ever changing and people are always coming up with new ways to dance to it. Guilds will often take an existing dance and add their own flair to it. For example, taiko troupes that decide to join in a local bon odori will often bring their bachi (drum sticks) and incorporate taiko drumming motions into the dance. Martial arts groups will incorporate chopping and kicking moves, etc. Sometimes groups may even come up with an entirely new dance altogether. Enka singer Mitsuko Nakamura is famous for singing Kawachi Ondo and a derivative of the song called Kawachi Otoko Bushi; she is credited for inventing a new Kawachi Ondo dance, and loyal fans get together and dance the "Nakamura Mitsuko" at bon dances.

== Goshu Ondo ==
Kawachi Ondo is closely tied to Goshu Ondo, as it is said Kawachi Ondo evolved from it. The kakegoe "ha iya korase dokoise" is found in both songs and is well known to Japanese citizens of Osaka. As in Kawachi Ondo, the lyrics in Goshu Ondo are fluid, and it takes expertise to become a proficient singer. Singers of Kawachi Ondo are often singers of Goshu Ondo as well. In some parts of Osaka, both are sung alternatively at bon dances.

== Kakegoe ==
Kawachi Ondo has two kakegoe, and they are sung at different times. They are "Ha enya korase, dokkoise!" and "Sorya yoi, dokoi sa, sa no yoiya sansa!"

== Excerpt ==
Japanese:
エエンさてはこのばの
皆様へちょいと出ました私は
お見かけ通りの若輩で
ヨ～ホイホイ

ハエンヤコラセ、ドッコイセ！

まかり出ました未熟者
お気に召すようにゃ読めないけれど
七百年の昔から歌い続けた
河内音頭に乗せまして
精魂込めて歌いましょう

ソリャヨイドッコイサ、サノヨイヤサンサ

Romaji:
Een sate wa kono ba no
Minasama e choito demashita watakushi wa
Omikake doori no jakuhai de
Yo- hoi hoi

Ha enya korase, dokkoise!

Makari demashita mijuku-mono
Oki ni mesu you nya yomenai keredo
Nanahyaku-nen no mukashi kara utaitsuzuketa
Kawachi ondo ni nosemashite
Seikon komete utaimasho

Sorya yoi dokkoisa, sa no yoiya sansa!

Translation:
Greetings to everyone here
I've come to address you briefly
Though I'm quite an amateur as you can see
Yo- hoi hoi

Ha enya korase, dokkoise!

I'm a beginner, coming before you takes great effort
And I may not sing in a pleasant manner
However, I will do my best to sing
This song, Kawachi ondo
Which has been sung for nearly 700 years

Sorya yoi dokkoisa, sa no yoiya sansa!

== See also ==
- Jōkō-ji (Yao) temple where Kawachi ondo is practised

== Media Links ==
- Kawachi Ondo Recording
- Video: Kawachi Ondo Festival, Yao City
