= Sashiko =

Traditional Japanese embroidery technique

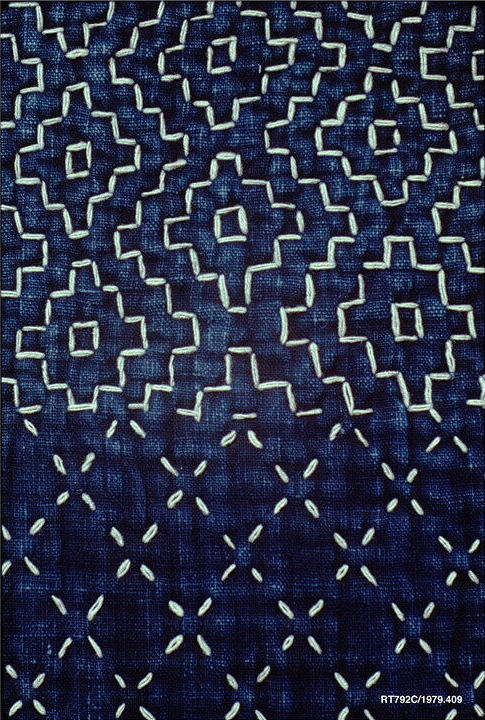
Detail of a mid-19th-century kimono decorated using sashiko, with white cotton threads on an indigo-dyed plain weave background (Metropolitan Museum of Art)

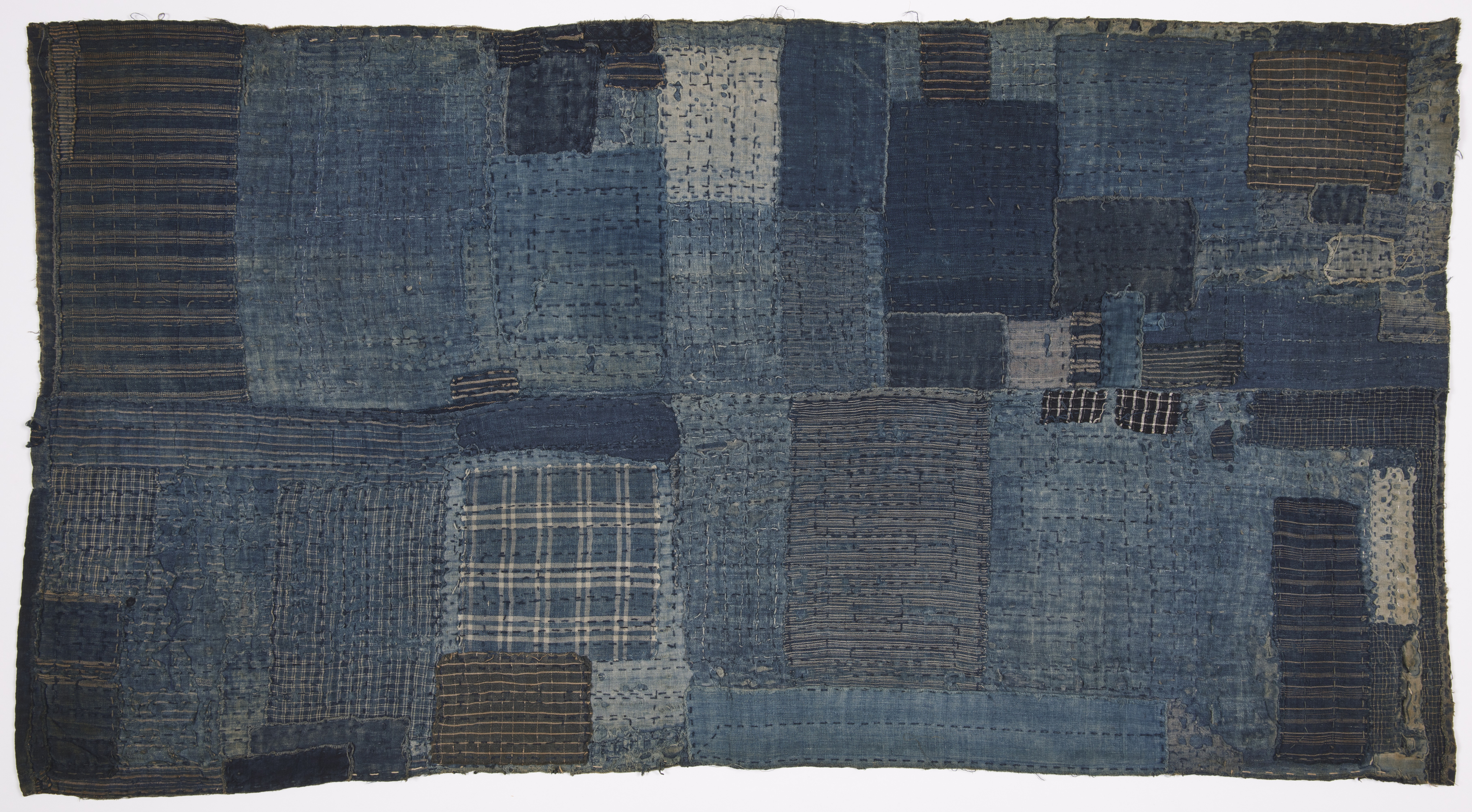
Child's sleeping mat (boro shikimono), late 1800s. The stitches are decorative, but also functional; they hold the pieced cotton rags together

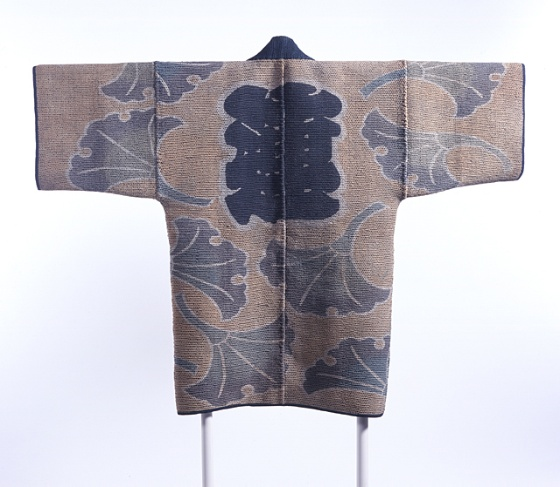
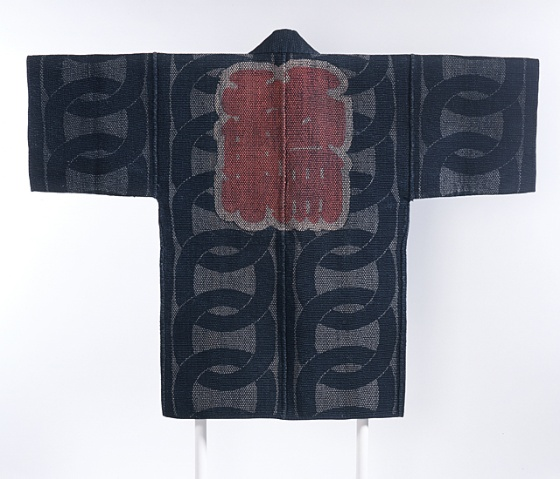
Sashiko stitching on a reversible fireman's coat with a design of ginkgo leaves (outer layer, shown top) and interlocking circles (inner layer, shown bottom), decorated with kanji characters applied using the tsutsugaki technique (plain-weave cotton, late Edo–early Meiji period, Los Angeles County Museum of Art)

Sashiko (刺し子, lit. 'little stabs') is a type of traditional Japanese embroidery or stitching used for the decorative and/or functional reinforcement of cloth and clothing. Owing to the relative cheapness and abundance of white cotton thread and indigo-dyed blue cloth in historical Japan, sashiko has a distinctive appearance of white-on-blue embroidery, though some decorative pieces may also use red thread.

== History ==
First coming into existence in the Edo period (1603–1867), sashiko embroidery was first applied to clothing out of a practical need, and would have been used to strengthen the homespun clothes of olden times. Worn out clothes were pieced together to make new garments by using simple running stitches. These clothes increased their strength with this durable embroidery. By the Meiji period (1868–1912), sashiko had been established enough that it had evolved into winter work in northern farming communities, when it was too cold to work outside.

Sashiko was commonly used to reinforce already-patched clothing around points of wear, but would also be used to attach patches to clothing, making the fabric ultimately stronger. It would also be used to layer thin fabrics to create warmth, and, in the case of some garments such as the coats of firemen (hikeshi banten), to create a thick and absorbent material that would be soaked in water before carrying out duties as a fireman. Though most sashiko utilises only a plain running stitch technique, sashiko is commonly used to create decorative and repeated embroidered patterns, and may be used for purely decorative purposes, such as in the creation of quilts and embroidery samplers.

== Designs and patterns ==
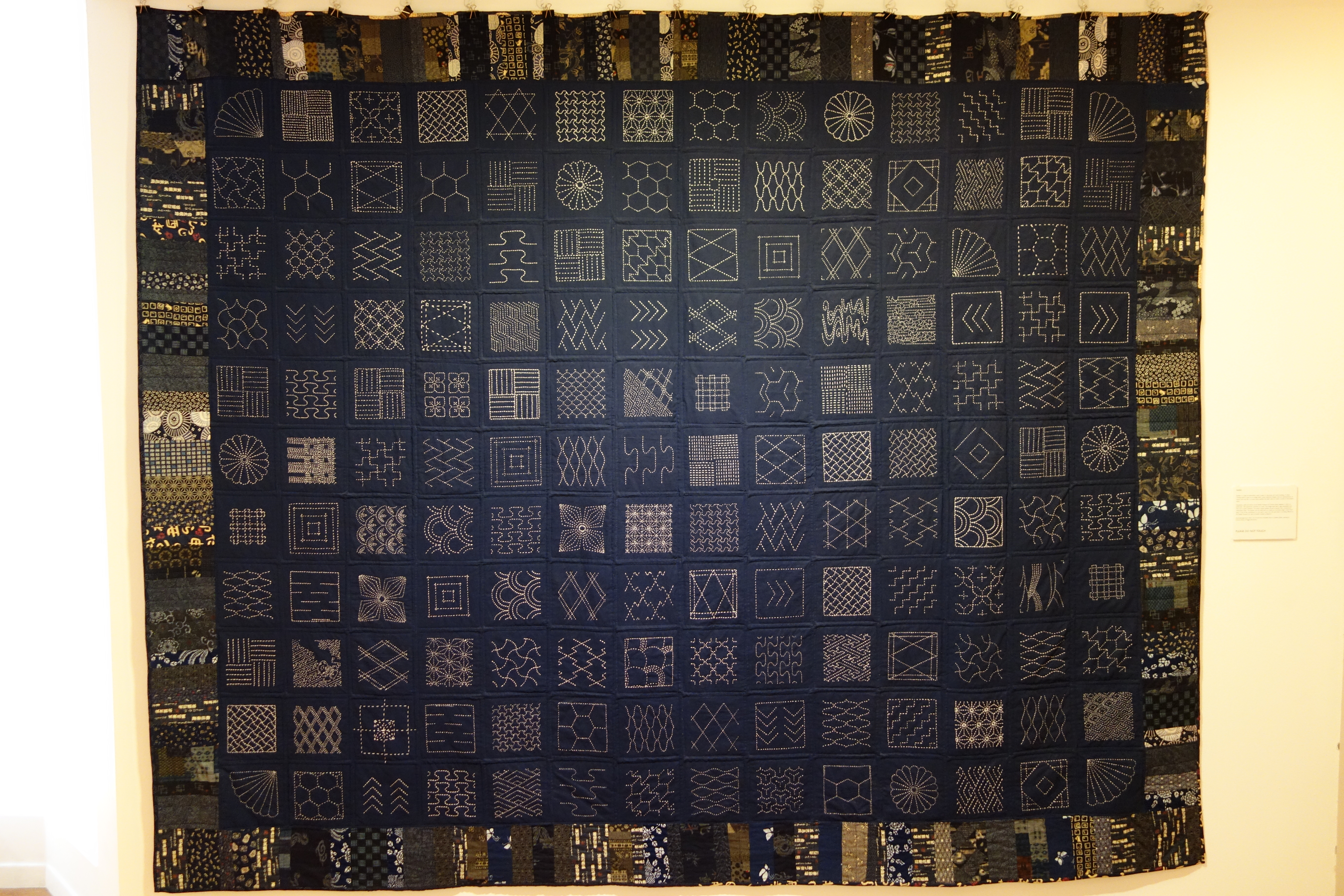
An assortment of sashiko designs

Sashiko utilises mostly geometric patterns, which fall into two main styles; moyōzashi, in which patterns are created with long lines of running stitches; and hitomezashi, where the pattern emerges from the alignment of single stitches made on a grid. Common sashiko motifs are waves, mountains, bamboo, arrow feathers, shippō-tsunagi, pampas grass and interlocking geometric shapes, amongst others. Sashiko embroidery is traditionally applied with the use of specialist needles and thread, though modern day sashiko may use modern embroidery threads and embroidery needles.

Many sashiko patterns were derived from Chinese designs, but just as many were developed by native Japanese embroiderers; for example, the style known as kogin-zashi, which generally consists of diamond-shaped patterns in horizontal rows, is a distinctive variety of sashiko that was developed in Aomori Prefecture. Other developments in sashiko have come from the work of Japanese artists, such as Katsushika Hokusai (1760–1849), whose 1824 New Forms for Design inspired many sashiko patterns.

Sashiko designs typically derive from nature, with some, considered to hold symbolism, seen particularly on garments such as the coats of fishermen.

=== Common sashiko patterns ===
- Tate-jima (縦縞, vertical stripes)
- Yoko-jima (横縞, horizontal stripes)
- Kōshi (格子, checks)
- Nakamura kōshi (中村格子, plaid design of the Nakamura family)
- Hishi-moyō (菱模様, diamonds)
- Yarai (矢来, bamboo fence)
- Hishi-igeta (菱井桁, parallel diamonds or crossed cords) — also known as tasuki
- Kagome (籠目, woven bamboo)
- Uroko (鱗, fish scales)
- Tate-waku (竪沸く, rising stream)
- Fundō (分銅, counterweights)
- Shippō (七宝, seven treasures of the Buddha)
- Amime (網目, fishing nets)
- Toridasuki (鳥襷, interlaced circles of two birds)
