= Kawachiya Kikusuimaru =

Japanese musician and singer (born 1963)

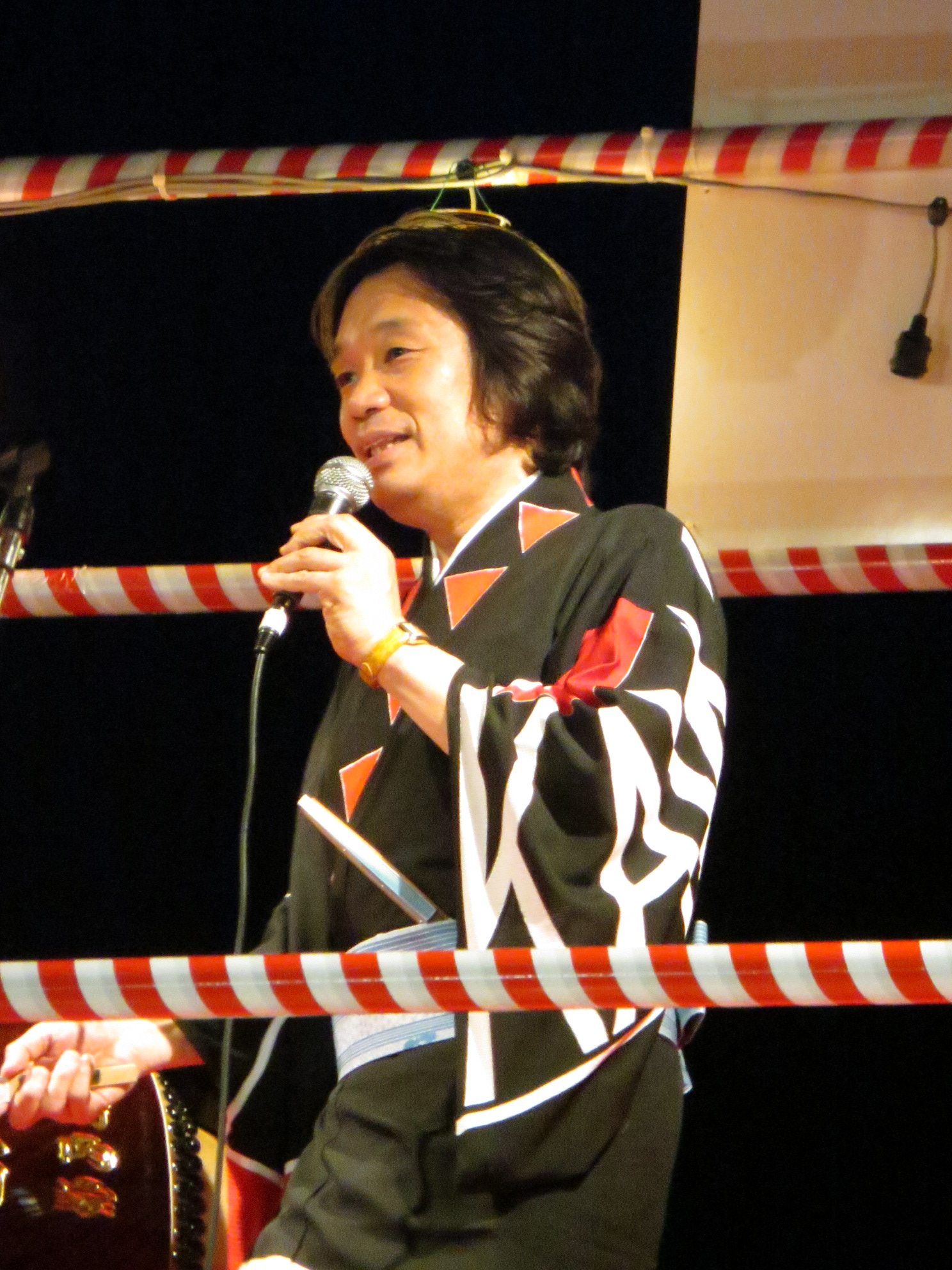

Kawachiya Kikusuimaru (河内家 菊水丸) (born 14 February 1963) is a Japanese musician and singer. He is a singer of Kawachi ondo folk music from Yao, Osaka.

== Career ==
Born in Yao, Osaka, he started studying Kawachi ondo with his father, Kawachiya Kikusui, at the age of nine. He came to national attention in 1991 with his reggae-style song "Kakin Ondo" (カーキン音頭, kaakin ondo) which was featured in a television commercial for recruitment magazine "From A" (フロム・エー). Kawachiya is known for performing in a wide variety of countries, from Hawaii in 1983 to Baghdad in 1990 (at the Iraq for peace festival) and Pyongyang in 1995.

He is also a writer and newspaper contributor. One of his published works is Kikusuimaru's Scrapbook (菊水丸のスクラップ帖), a collection of his articles for the Osaka Shimbun newspaper.

== Discography ==
Contributing artist

- The Rough Guide to the Music of Japan (1999, World Music Network)
