= The Rough Guide to the Music of Japan (1999 album) =

Compilation album by Various artists
- Released: 20 April 1999
- Genre: World, Japanese
- Length: 77:30
- Label: World Music Network

Full series chronology
The Rough Guide to Tango (1999)	The Rough Guide to the Music of Japan (1999)	The Rough Guide to World Music: Africa, Europe and the Middle East (1999)

The Rough Guide to the Music of Japan is a world music compilation album originally released in 1999. Part of the World Music Network Rough Guides series, the album presents an eclectic mix of the music of Japan ranging from traditional Japanese music (including Ryukyuan and Ainu music) to J-pop by artists of the 1990s.

Liner notes were written by Paul Fisher, a journalist and broadcaster specializing in Japanese music and founder of Far Side Music. Phil Stanton—co-founder of the World Music Network—produced the album. This release was followed by a second edition in 2008.

== Critical reception ==
Professional ratings
Review scores
Source	Rating
AllMusic	4/5 stars

Alex Henderson of AllMusic called the album an "interesting and eclectic survey" that, like other albums in the series, "keeps us guessing and provides a variety of rewarding music along the way".

== Track listing ==
No.	Title	Artist	Length
1.	"Makura"	Takeharu Kunimoto	1:00
2.	"Kakin Ondo"	Kawachiya Kikusuimaru	6:11
3.	"Fukko Bushi"	Soul Flower Mononoke Summit	3:11
4.	"Nikata Bushi"	Michihiro Sato	3:43
5.	"Takio's Soran Bushi"	Takio Ito & Takio Band	4:49
6.	"Amagoi Bushi"	Yasuba Jun & An-Chang Project	4:18
7.	"Mangetsu No Yube"	Takashi Hirayasu	4:13
8.	"Hiyami Kachi Bushi"	Ayame Band	3:14
9.	"Moji Banana No Tatakiuri"	Tadayoshi Ikawa	1:57
10.	"Utuwaskarap"	Oki	6:05
11.	"Nyorai Shizune"	Shozan Tanabe	4:31
12.	"Ubue"	Yukihiro Goto	5:34
13.	"Asadoya Yunta"	Tetsuhiro Daiku	4:13
14.	"James Bond Theme"	The Surf Champlers	3:04
15.	"Haisai Ojisan Haisai Ojisan"	Makoto Kubota & The Sunset Gang	5:15
16.	"Agari Jo"	Yasuko Yoshida	4:51
17.	"Ho Na Mi"	Koto Vortex	4:01
18.	"Utage"	Eitetsu Hayashi	3:29
19.	"Shi Chome"	Cicala Mvta	3:51
