= Gōshū ondo =

The Gōshū ondo (江州音頭 is a type of ondo, a traditional Japanese dance song. It originated in Shiga Prefecture which was formerly known as Gōshū. It is believed to have been perfected around the Meiji Era.

== Form ==
Gōshū ondo is a lot like Kawachi ondo in that the structure of the tune is quite fluid. There are no set lyrics, the themes used in the song vary from region to region, and the song's structure is variable. There is only a set theme which performers can improvise on, and a returning chorus which is sung back by singers, or the audience.

The returning chorus is sung in pitched notes, but the singers consider this a kakegoe. Said to have evolved from a religious song game, the song incorporates a lot of call-and-response, where listeners who know the song are encouraged to participate shouting back kakegoe.

The tune of Gōshū ondo can be used to tell stories, or talk about current events. There is even a version of Gōshū ondo that names all the prefectures and capitals in Japan. The staple instruments are always a taiko drum and a stringed instrument, be it an electric guitar or a shamisen, though the song can be sung with just the drum alone.

== Kakegoe ==
The returning chorus, or kakegoe in Goshu Ondo is:

"Sorya! Yoito yoiyamakka dokkoisa no se."

== Goshu Ondo Imported ==
The song originates in Shiga prefecture, however, it was imported to a part of Northern Osaka known as "Kawachi". It is said that Goshu Ondo was the prototype for the song Kawachi ondo, which is sung in that part of Japan; both of these songs are often sung alongside each other in that region. The songs share a lot of the same instrumentation, form and kakegoe.

== Excerpt ==
Japanese:
こりゃ どっこいしょ！

えんや なんじゃいな！

ええ 皆様 頼みます

は えんや こらせ どっこいせ！

ああ これから よいやせ この掛け声を

そりゃ よいと よいやまっか どっこいさのせ

えんさては この場の 皆さんへ

あらどしたい

Rōmaji:
Korya dokkoisho!

Enya nanjaina!

Ee minasama tanomimasu

Ha enya korase dokkoise!

Aa korekara yoiyase kono kakegoe wo

Sorya yoito yoiyamakka dokkoisa no se!

En sate wa kono ba no minasan he

Ara doshtai!

Translation:
With a whoa heave ho!

Alright, whatcha want?

Alright, everyone, I'm asking you

Alright, come now, don't hold back

Alright, let's begin, sing this kakegoe back to me

Sorya yoito yoiyamakka dokkoisa no se!

Alright, everyone, listen what I gotta say

Oh, what's wrong?
