= Takashi Hirayasu =

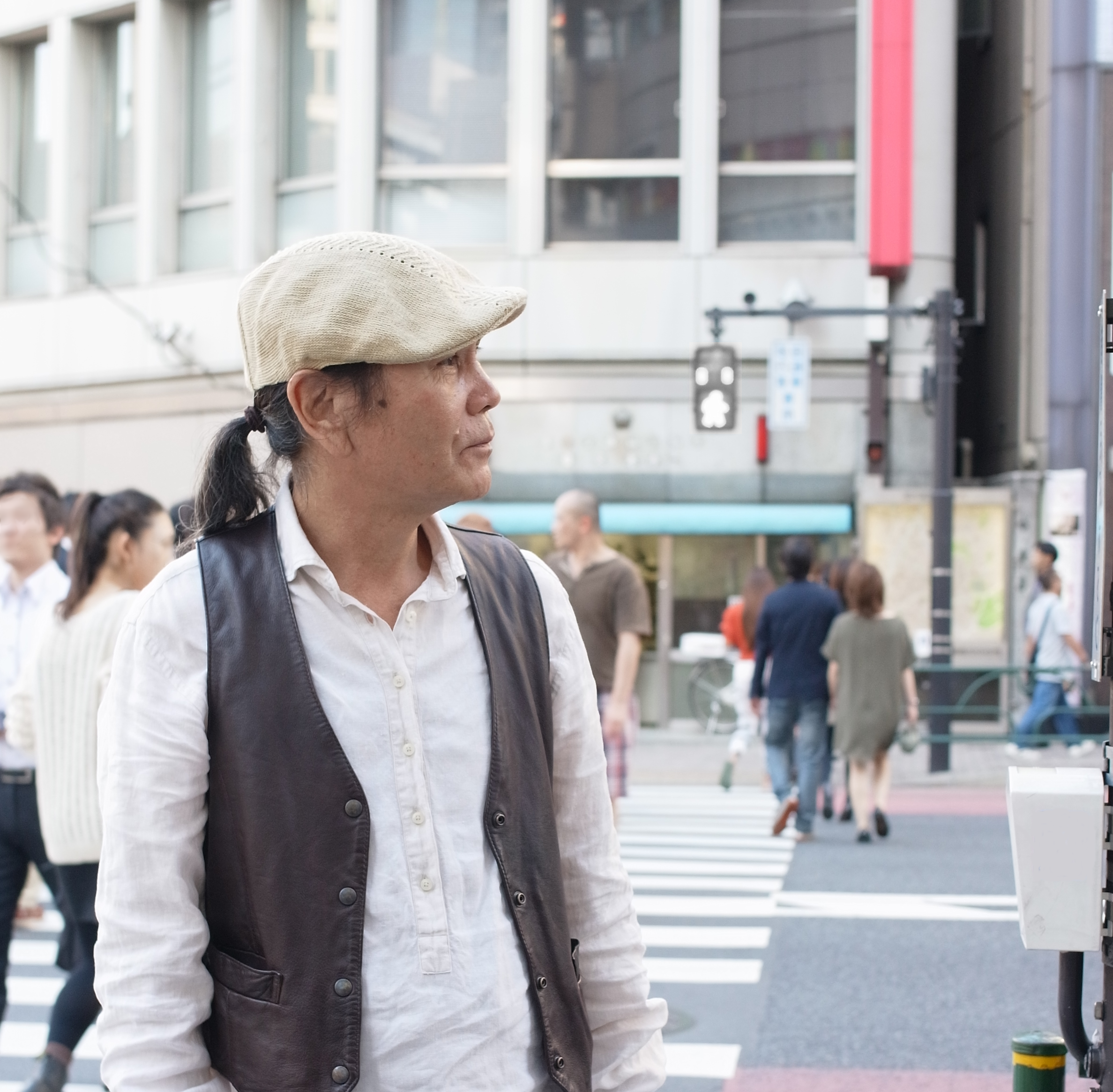

Background information
- Born: January 5, 1952 (age 74); Nakagusuku, Okinawa, Japan
- Occupations: Singer, guitarist and sanshin player

Takashi Hirayasu (平安 隆, Hirayasu Takashi) (born 5 January 1952 in Nakagusuku, Okinawa) is an Okinawan musician. He has released two albums and is known in the United States particularly for his collaborations with Bob Brozman a Hawaiian guitarist . He was also a member of Champloose.

== Discography ==
=== Albums ===
- Kariyushi no Tsuki (1998, Respect Records)
- Jin Jin/Firefly CD (2000)
- Nankuru Naisa CD (2001)

=== Contributing artist ===
- The Rough Guide to the Music of Japan CD (1999, World Music Network)
- Putumayo Kids Presents: Asian Dreamland CD (2006)
- Rough Guide To Japan CD (2008)
