= Takeharu Kunimoto =

Japanese shamisen player and rōkyoku singer

Takeharu Kunimoto (国本武春, Kunimoto Takeharu; November 1, 1960 – December 24, 2015) was a prominent Japanese shamisen player and rōkyoku singer.

== Early life ==
At the age of 14 Kunimoto attended a Bill Monroe concert in Tokyo and shook his hand, thus inspiring Takeharu to play bluegrass.

== Musical career ==
In addition to performing and recording traditional music, he was also the only prominent shamisen player to perform and record bluegrass music; he spent some time in the 2000s in the bluegrass program of East Tennessee State University in Johnson City, Tennessee. He also performed and recorded in a rock music-influenced style.

== Death ==
Kunimoto died at the age of 55 on December 24, 2015, following an illness.

== Discography ==
Contributing artist

- The Rough Guide to the Music of Japan(1999, World Music Network)
- The Last Frontier: Appalachian Shamisen (2005, Now and Then Records)
