= Kogin-zashi =

Japanese traditional textile craft

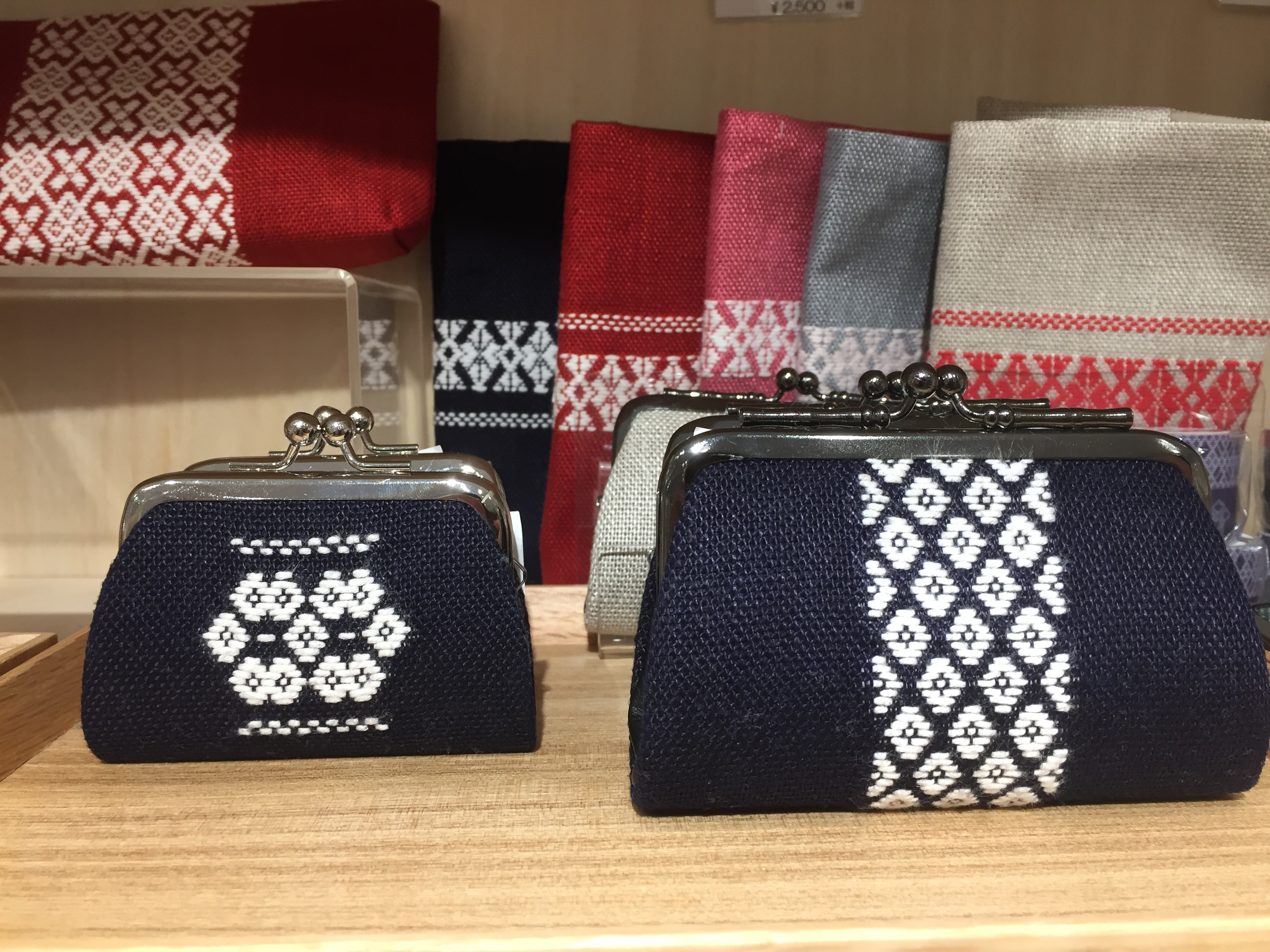
Various items in Aomori Prefecture featuring kogin-zashi patterns

Kogin-zashi (こぎん刺し) is one of the techniques of sashiko, or traditional Japanese decorative reinforcement stitching, that originated in the part of present-day Aomori Prefecture controlled by the Tsugaru clan during the Edo period (1603-1867). It is also referred to as sashi-kogin.

Kogin-zashi is generally constructed of white cotton embroidery in diamond patterns on indigo-dyed fabrics such as cotton, linen and hemp. During the Edo period, peasants were not permitted to wear cotton cloth in the Tsugaru region, so cotton thread was added to linen cloth with the aim of bypassing these regulations and making clothes warmer and more protective during the harsh winter weather, as well as strengthening the cloth.

== History ==
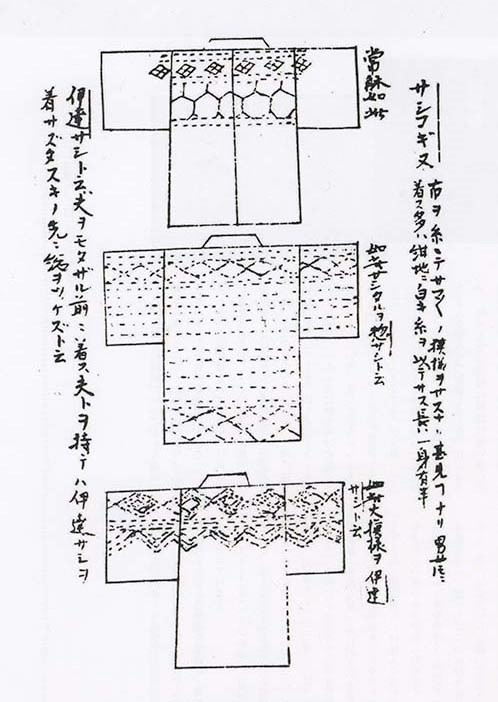
Kogin-zashi patterns as depicted in Sadahiko Hibino's Ouminzui, written in 1788

During the Edo period, peasants were not permitted to wear cotton cloth in the Tsugaru region. Peasants initially attempted to stay warm by wearing multiple layers of linen, but the fabric frayed easily. As a solution, cotton thread was added as embroidery to linen cloth with the aim of bypassing the regulations and making clothes more protective during the harsh winter weather, as well as strengthening the cloth.

Later, during the Meiji period (1868-1912), the class system was abolished. This enabled the use of cotton in clothing for everyone in the former holdings of the Tsugaru, and embroidering dyed indigo cloth with white cotton thread became more common. As the access to materials increased, competition to design the most beautiful patterns rose, with an estimate of over 300 different kogin-zashi patterns being created.

In the 20th century, the craft of kogin-zashi was streamlined, establishing the three general types that are seen today: nishi-kogin, higashi-kogin, and mishima-kogin. The Hirosaki Koginzashi Institute has sought to preserve and promote kogin-zashi since the 1960s.

In 1996, kogin-zashi was given the status of a traditional craft item of Aomori Prefecture. In the present-day, elementary school students in Aomori Prefecture learn how to hand-stitch the pattern.

== Variations ==
=== Nishi-kogin ===
The nishi-kogin pattern originated in the area west of the city of Hirosaki. Stripes placed on the shoulders of clothing are arranged in a horizontal pattern. This was done to increase their strength while carrying goods over the shoulder.

=== Higashi-kogin ===
The higashi-kogin pattern originated in the area east of the city of Hirosaki, in today's Minamitsugaru District. It lacks the stripes that are seen in the other two varieties and uses mostly diamond shapes.

=== Mishima-kogin ===
The mishima-kogin pattern originated in the area north of the city of Hirosaki. The area was not as well-off as other parts of the Tsugaru region, suffering from poor harvests caused by the earlier onset of the harsh winter. As a result, patterns were smaller than seen in other areas due to the lack of material. Horizontal stripes are used, though not as heavily as seen in nishi-kogin patterns.

== See also ==
- Katsushika Hokusai
