= Hikeshi banten =

Coats of Japanese firefighters

Hikeshi banten is a reversible hanten coat worn by hikeshi, Japanese firefighters of the Edo period, often decorated with symbolic images. Firefighter brigades consisted either of samurai (buke hikeshi) or commoners (machi hikeshi). The coats were made of multiple layers of tightly stitched cotton fabric, quilted using the sashiko technique of running stitches. On one side, the coats had only the firefighting brigade name. The other side featured elaborate designs "resist-dyed using the tsutsugaki method". The inner designs often depicted warrior heroes, or mythical creatures associated with bravery or water, often inspired by ukiyo-e prints.

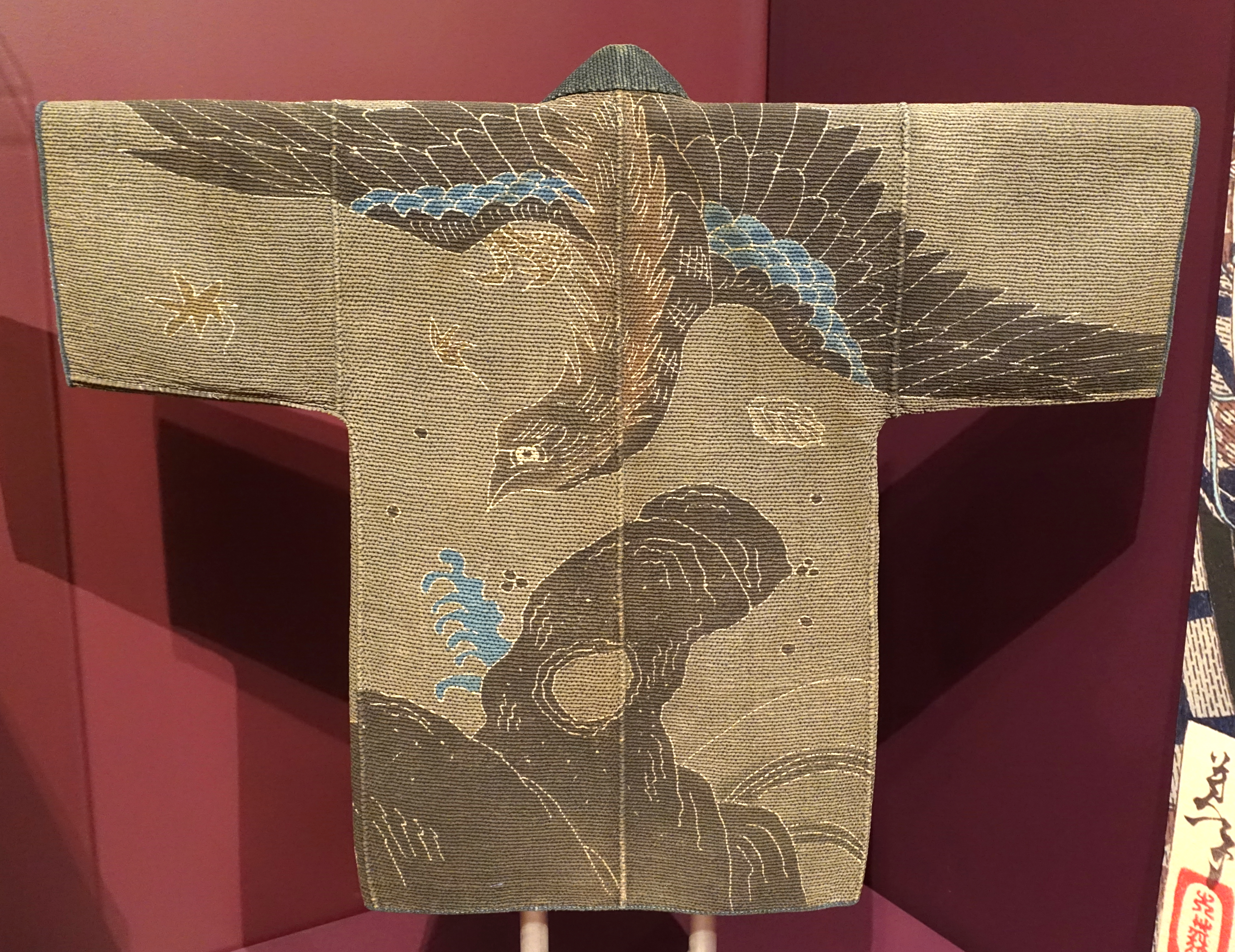

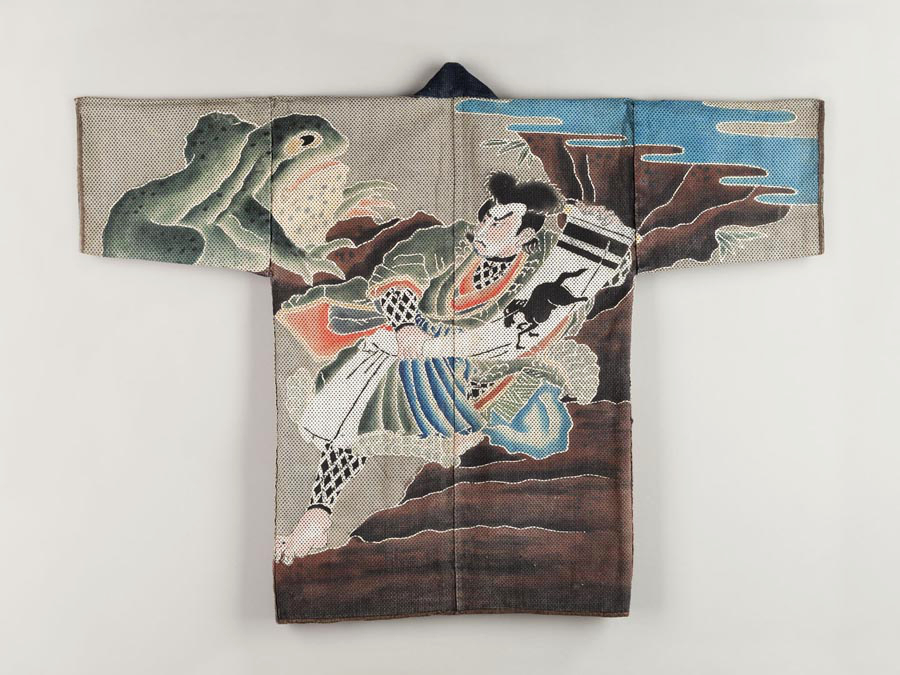

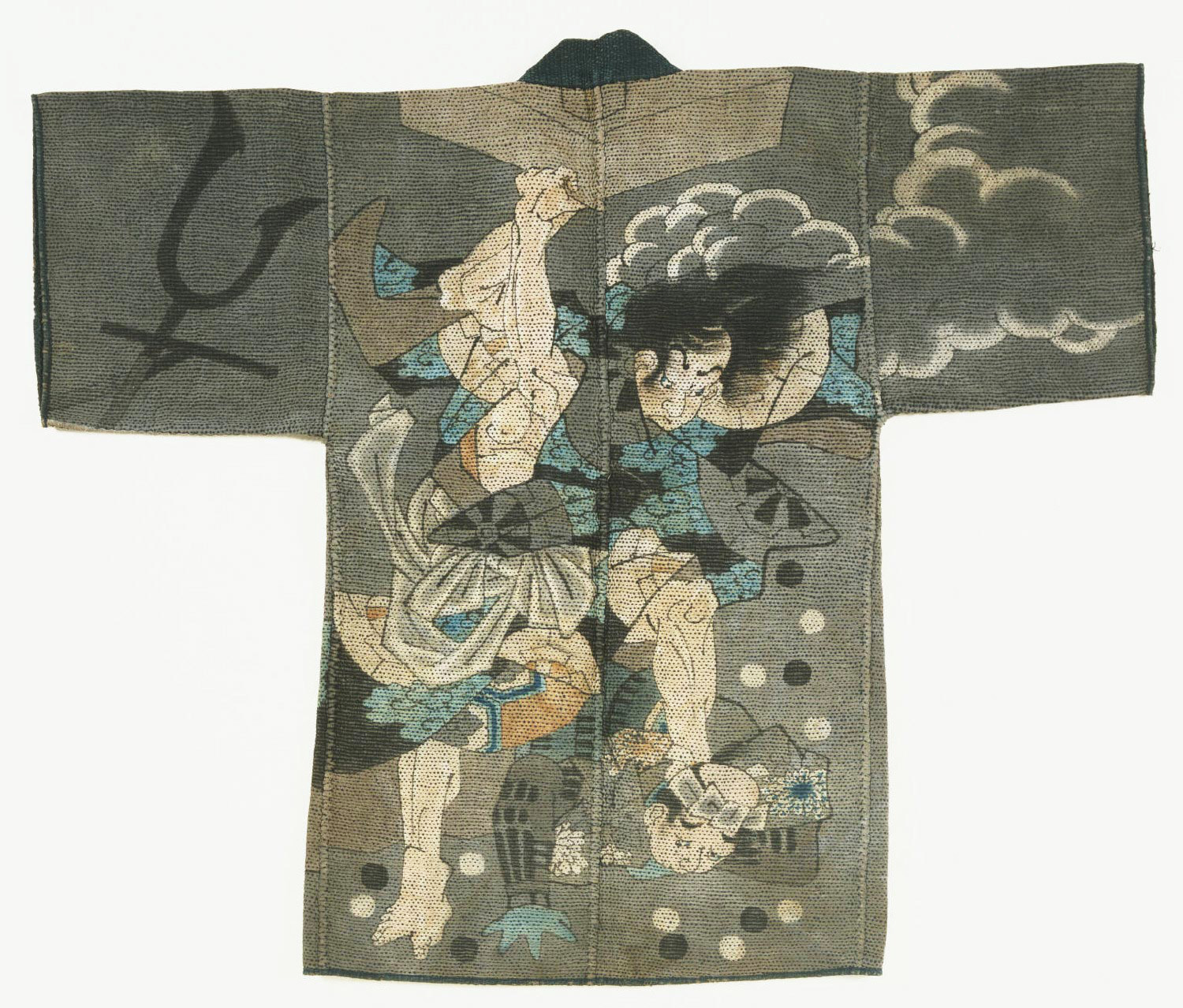

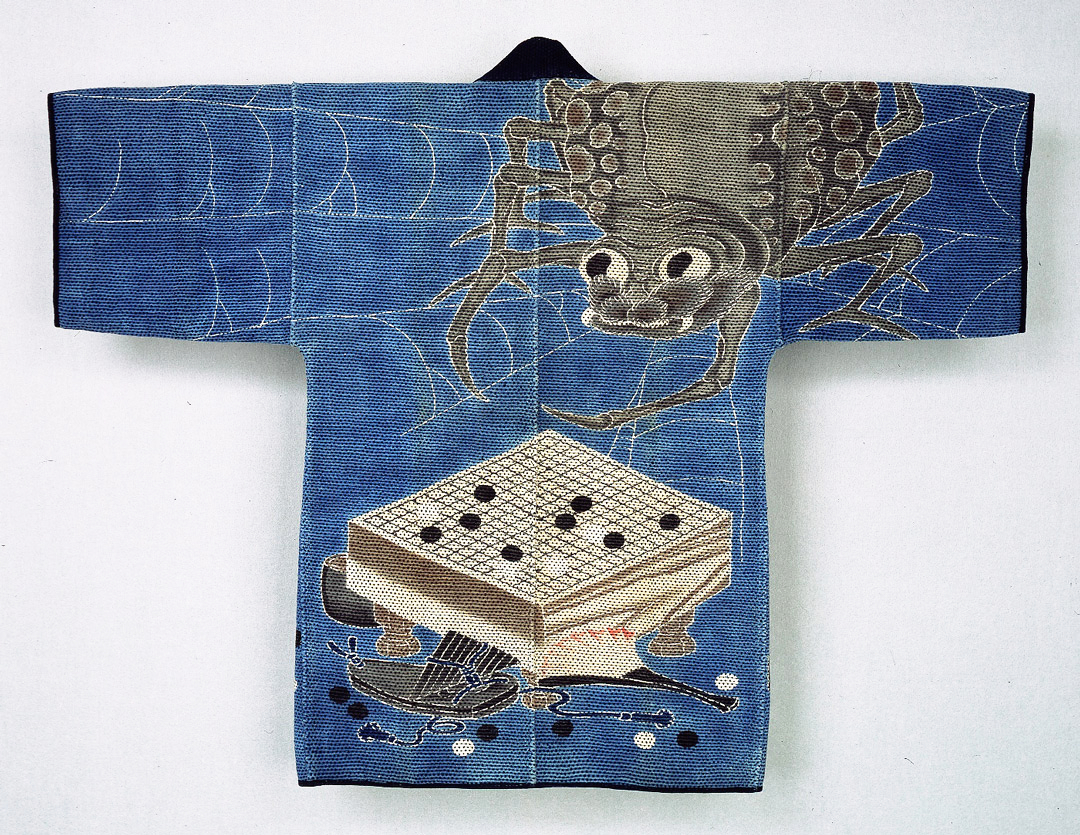

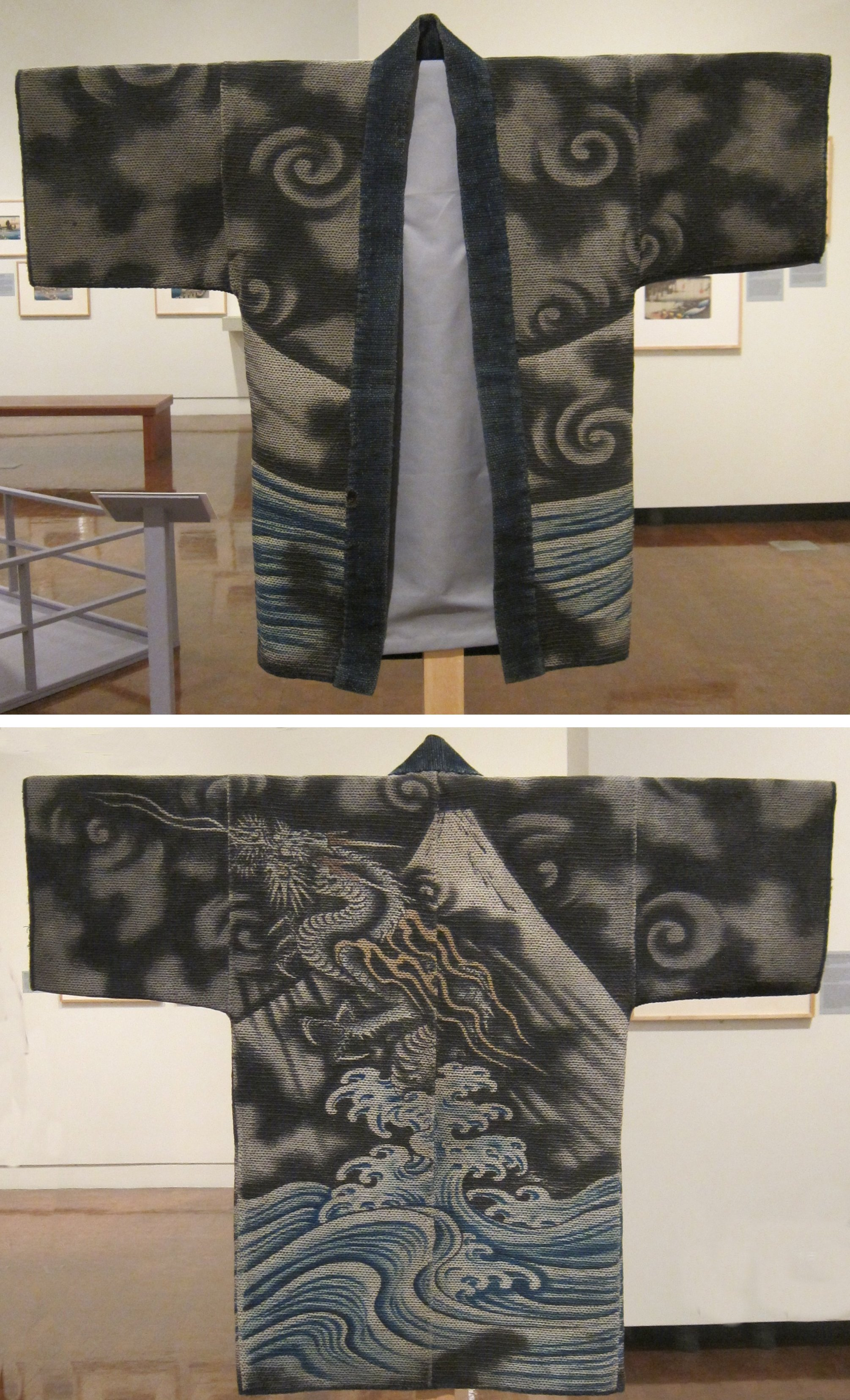

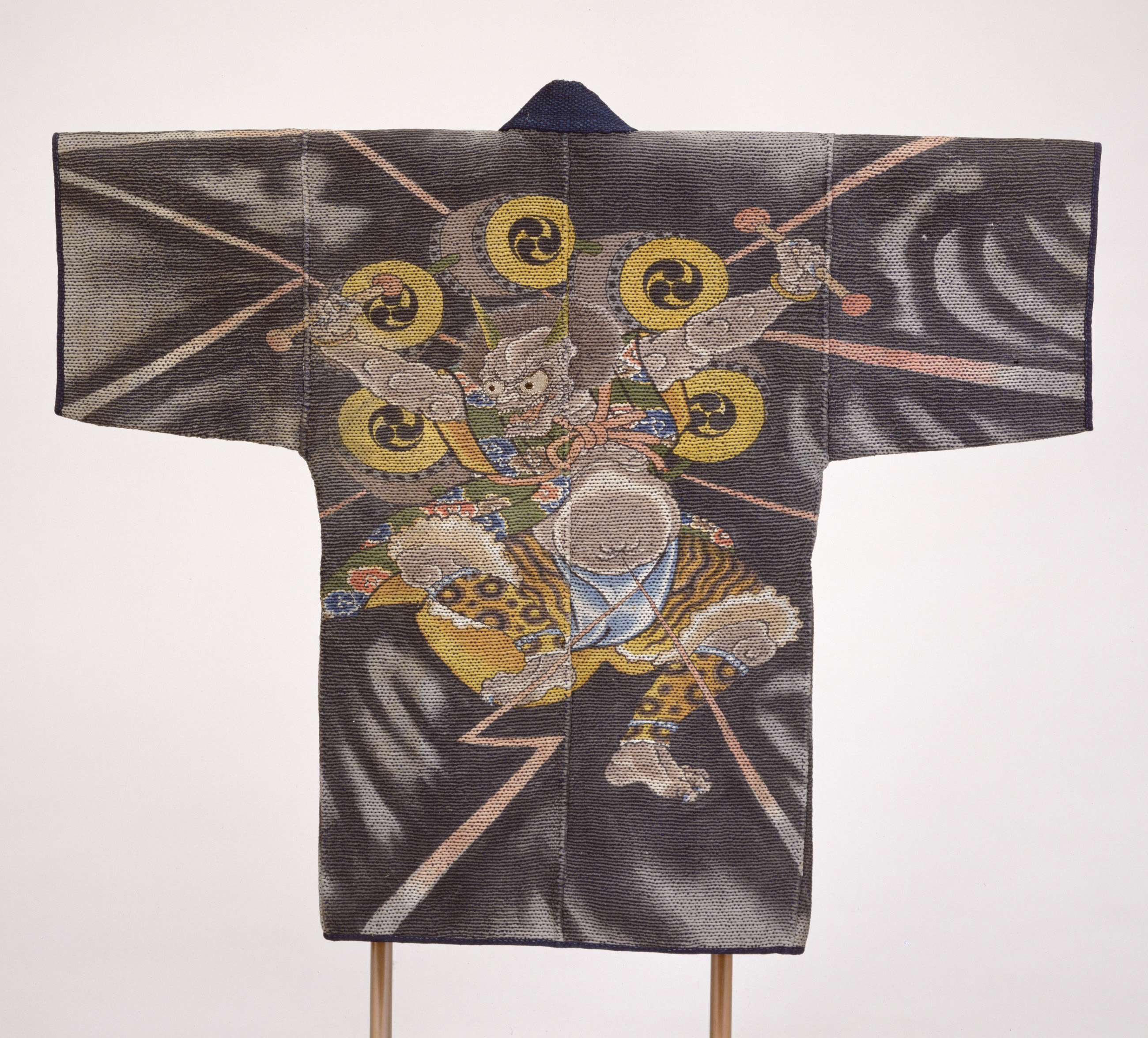

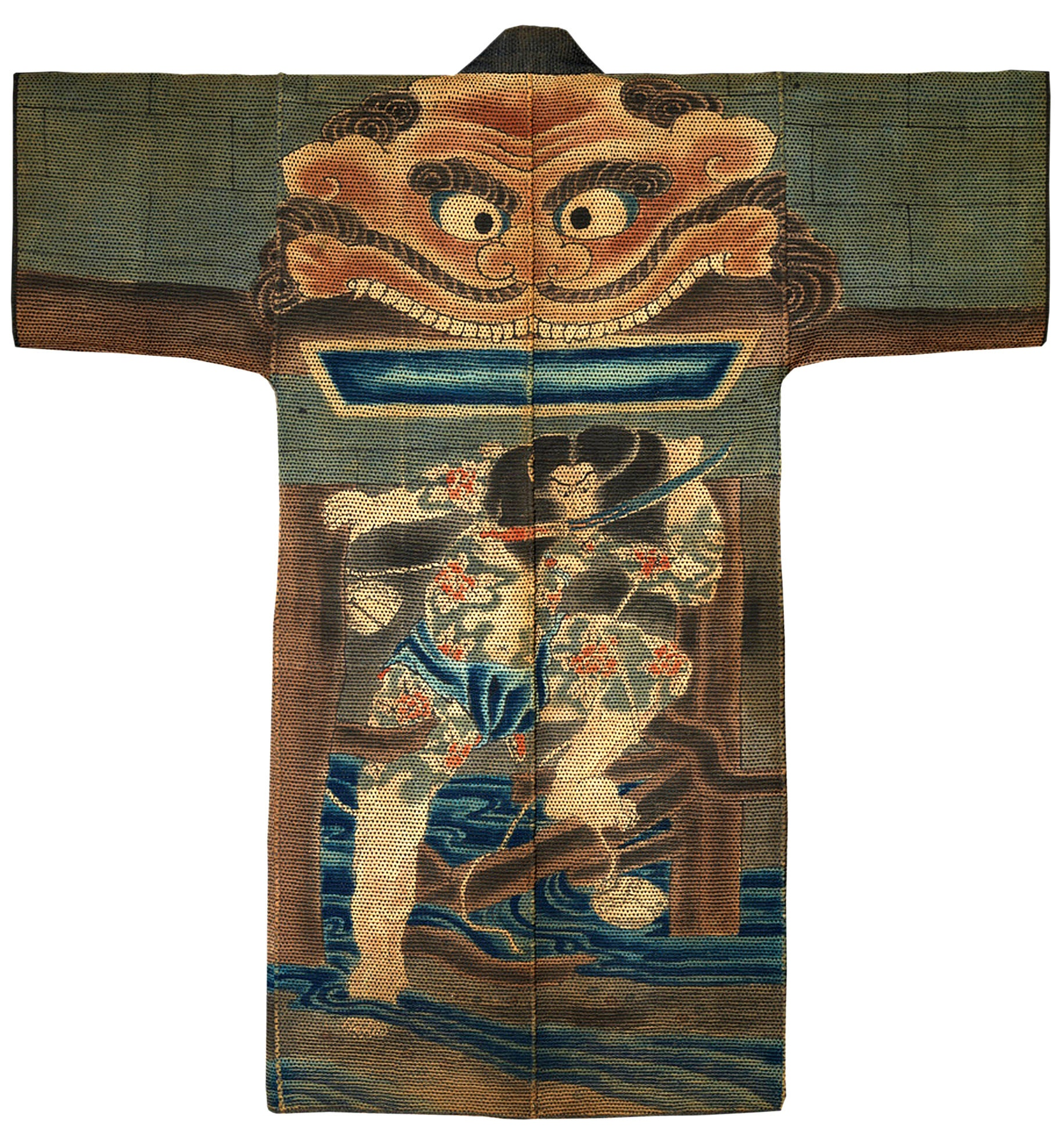

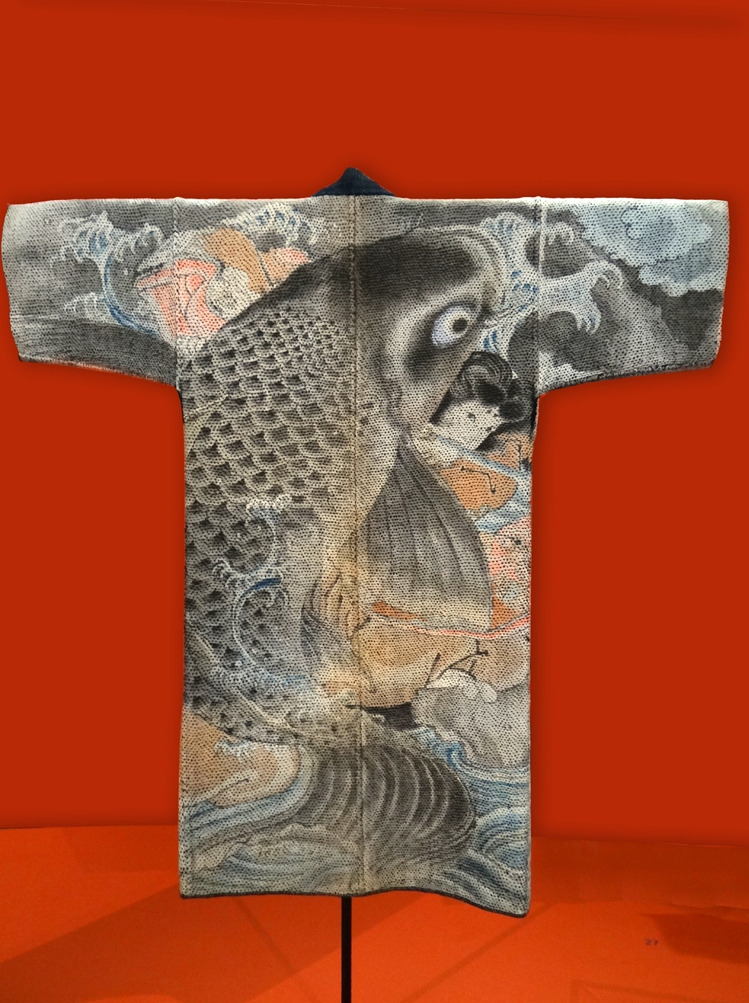

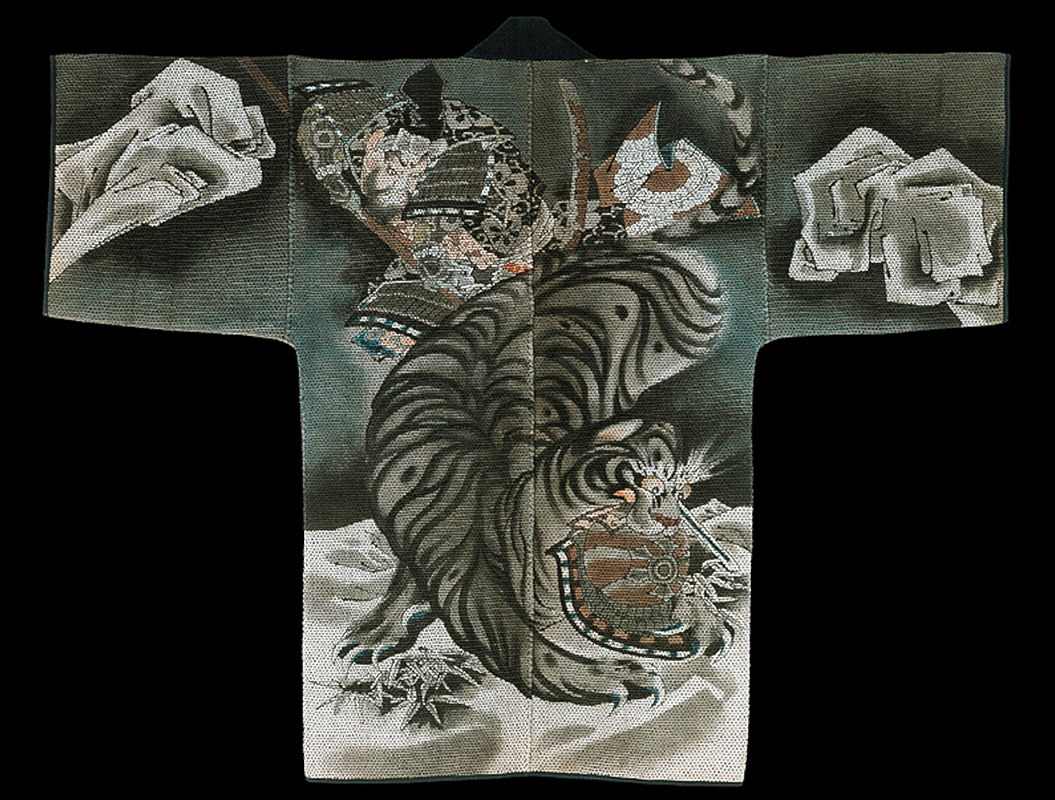

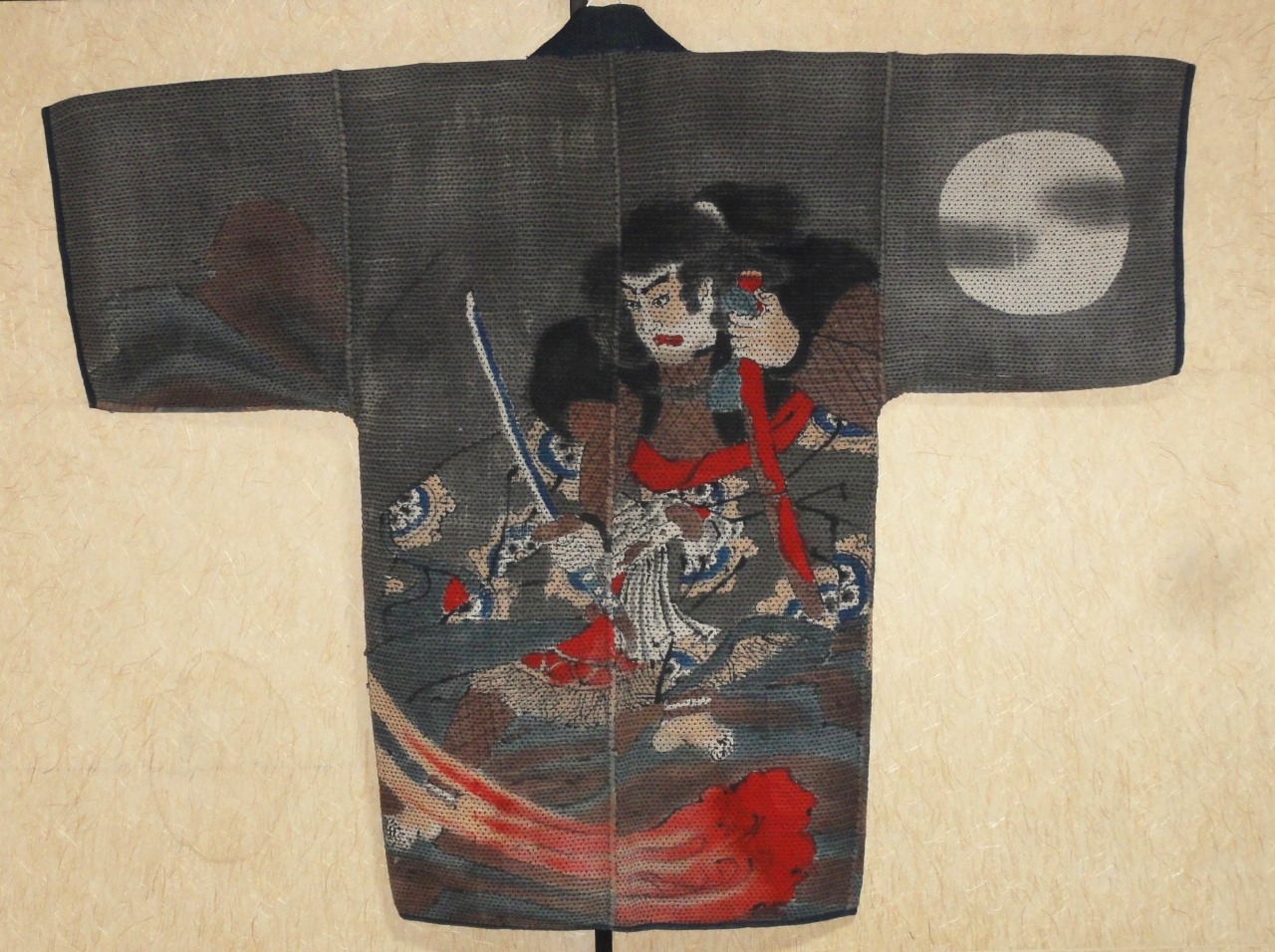

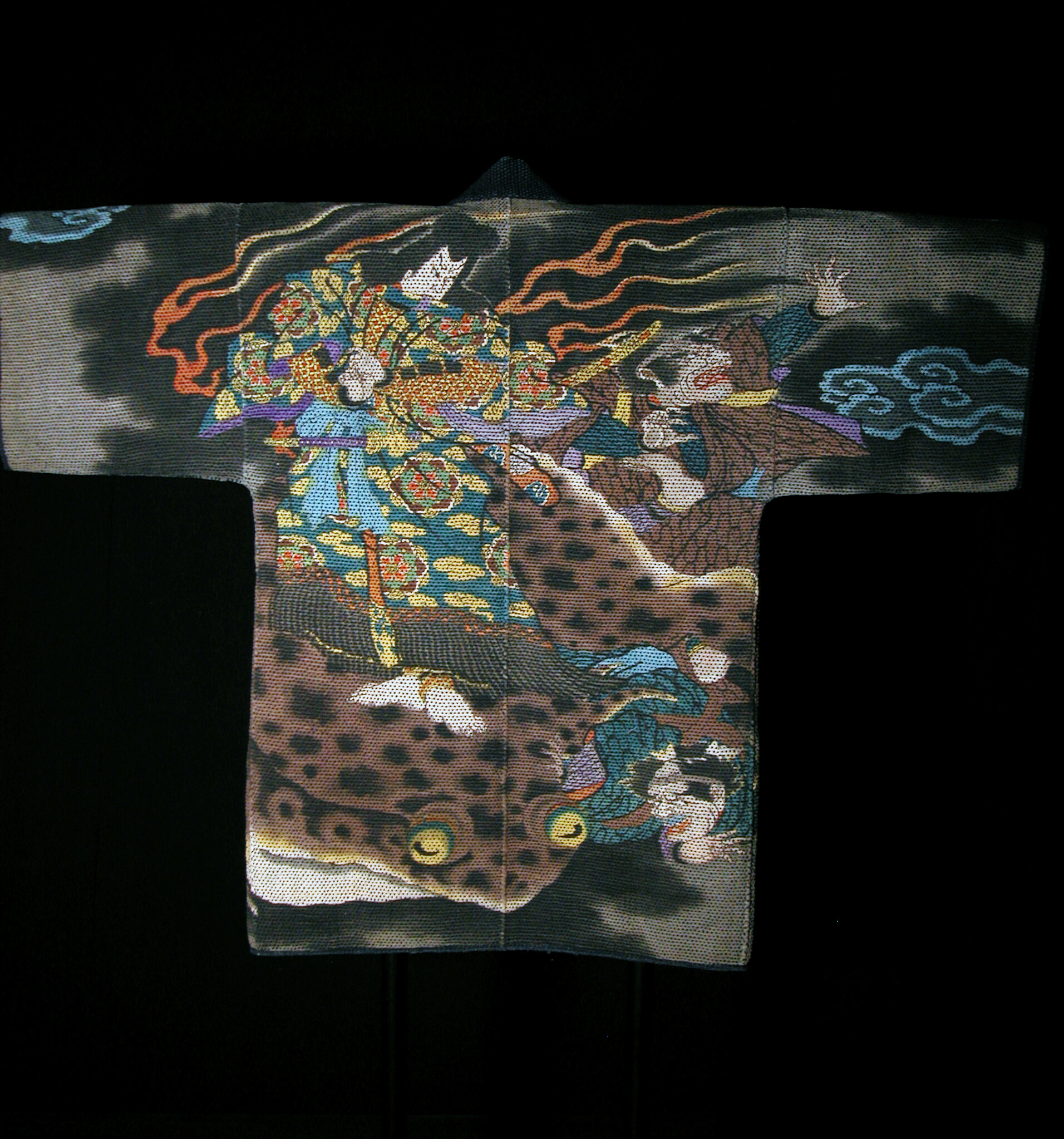
