= Matoi =

Japanese fire alarm flag

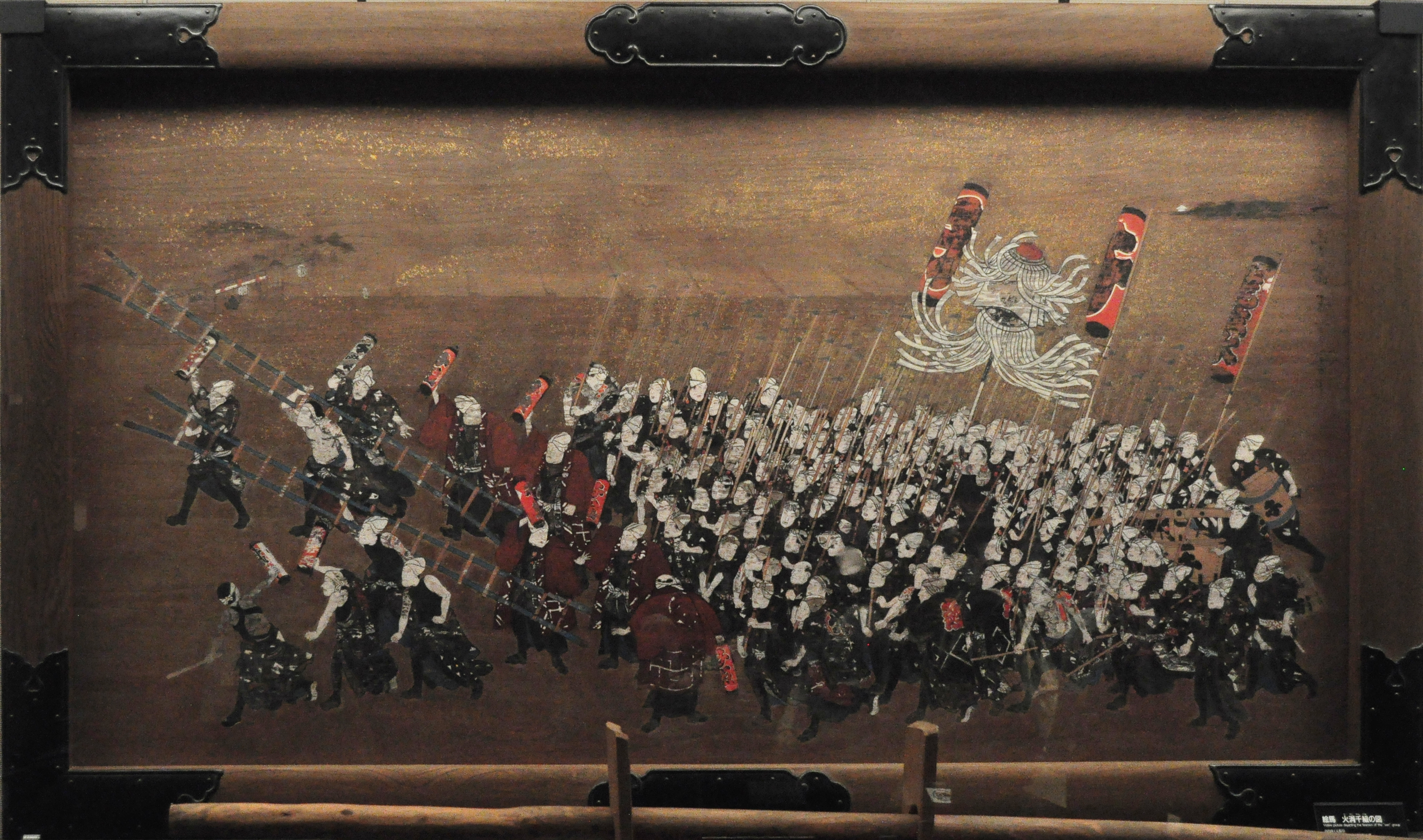
1833 artwork depicting firefighters with matoi and ladders, Edo-Tokyo Museum

A matoi (纏/まとい) was a flag used in Edo period Japan by hikeshi firemen to notify people of a fire near or within a building. It was taken up on a roof near the burning building by the matoi holder (纏持, matoimochi) and waved to draw the attention of other groups of firefighters, who would then hurry to the site of the fire to assist. Each different group of firemen in the Edo period had their own matoi to identify themselves.

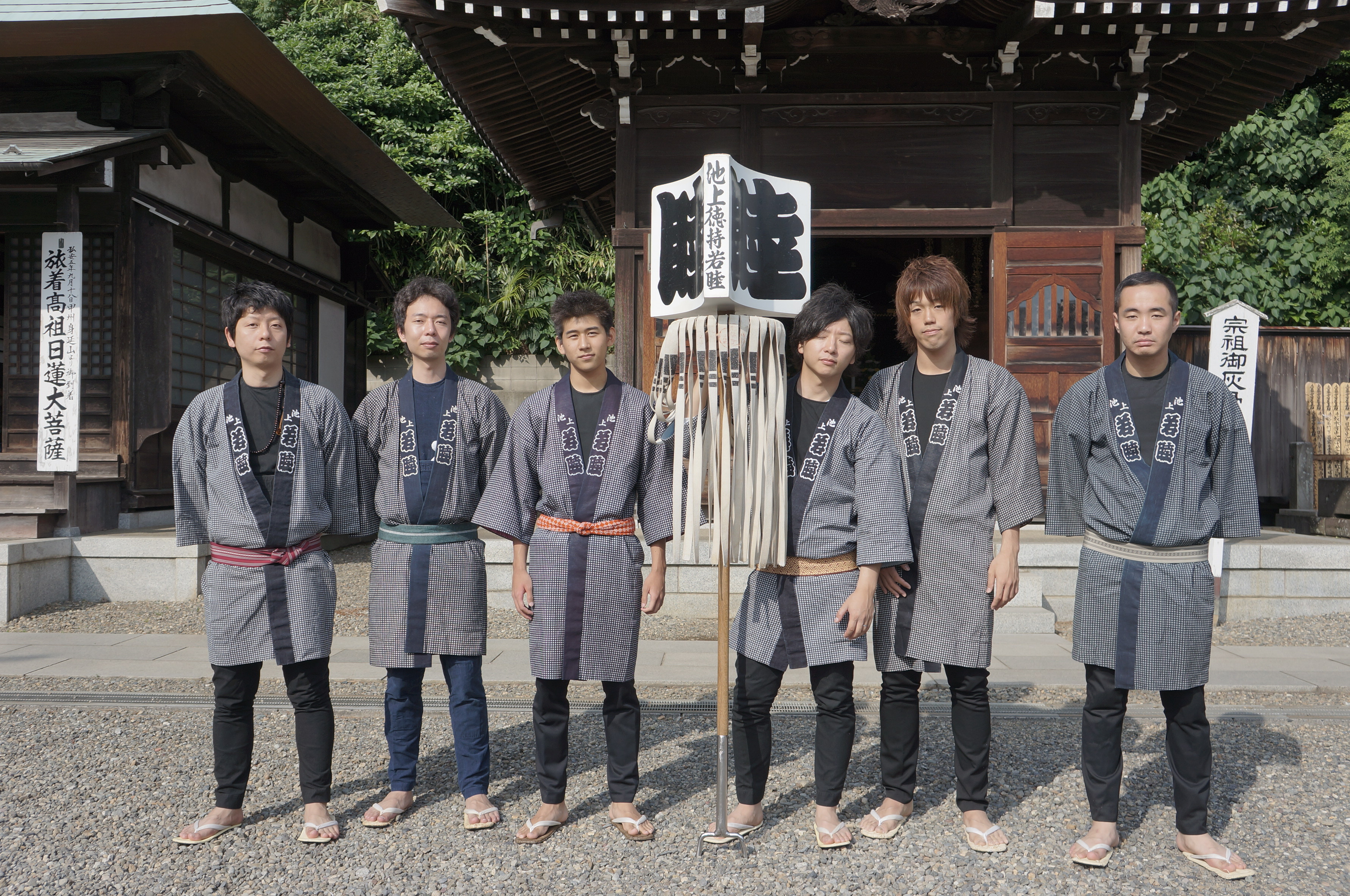
Members of the Mutsu-kai group with matoi in Ikegami, Tokyo, Japan

In modern Japan, the matoi is only used for ceremonial purposes, for example on New Year's firefighter event, Dezomeshiki. The Fire Museum (消防博物館 東京消防庁消防防災資料センター) of the Tokyo Fire Department has a large collection of replica matoi.

== Bibliography ==
- Japan Hikeshi (Firemen) Preserving Foundation
