= Hikeshi =

Fire brigades in Edo and Meiji-era Tokyo

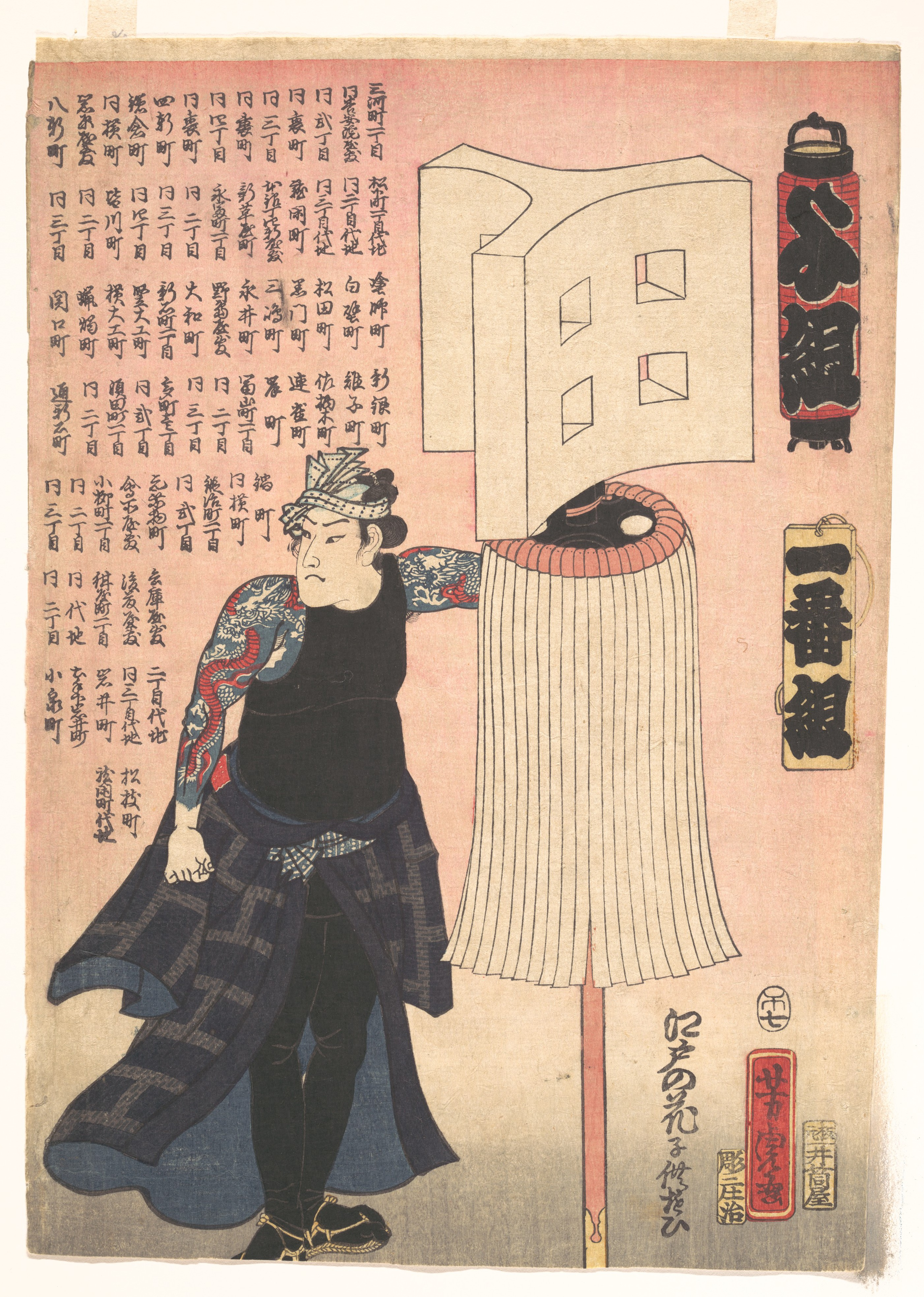
Utagawa Yoshitora, Hikeshi with a matoi

Hikeshi (Japanese: 火消 (Note: Compound words often include "bikeshi", a variant pronunciation due to rendaku)) were fire brigades in Edo and Meiji-era Tokyo. Members of these brigades were also called by this term.

Japanese cities were extremely prone to fires due to the fact that paper and wood were the main building materials. Firefighters cleared the buildings that stood on the fire's path, preventing it from incinerating nearby buildings. Water extinction was almost never used because of its low efficiency.

The first fire brigades were organised by daimyo; but after the Great Fire of Meireki, a city fire service was started. Later, volunteer fire brigades joined the city firefighters. All three types of hikeshi worked simultaneously in intense competition.

== Background and techniques ==
Fires in Edo (modern Tokyo) and Nagasaki were the most dangerous in Japan. Tokyo's position in the centre of the Kantō Plain makes the buildings fire-hazardous in the winter: the cold and dry Siberian winds facilitated burning while making the residents to keep active fireplaces to stay warm and to use oil lamps for lighting; because of this, two-thirds of all Tokyo fires occurred from November to February. Japanese houses of that time were built from paper and wood (plastering was only accessible for the daimyo and the wealthiest of the merchants (Note: Although the merchants were explicitly forbidden to plaster their houses later)), with hay or wooden covering; only palaces and some of the administration's residences had roof tiles. Edo's population doubled from 1640 to 1693, making 800,000 people, while in the country's main port city, Nagasaki, it grew from 5,000 in 1590 to 64,000 in 1696; this led to an unprecedented population density for that time. Fires were so frequent in Edo that a saying was coined: "Fires and fights are Edo's flowers". (Note: Japanese: 火事と喧嘩は江戸の華, kaji to kenka wa edo no hana) Between 1601 and 1867 Edo had 49 big fires while in Osaka, where almost all of the buildings were plastered and had roof tiles, only had 6.

The main technique of firefighting was demolishing the buildings that stood by the sides of the flame source so that the houses standing by the wind's direction would burn down until the paddy fields; the fire's path became long but very narrow. Edo's hikeshi were held the highest qualification; they climbed to the roofs and destroyed only the smallest necessary part of the hazardous roof covering or walls; in contrast, Osaka's firefighters demolished buildings completely.

Water pumps only appeared in Japan in the middle of the 18th century, but did not become very popular because bamboo hose were hard to use while the water pressure was merely enough for a weak stream. Citizens trusted the dry firefighting more and used water hoses solely to pour water on cotton banten-clad hikeshi before they begin work; water pump porters received only half of the salary of a matoi bearer. Samurai firefighter brigades used water extinction and undressed up to their fundoshi before work. The way Japanese cities were built made dry firefighting more effective compared to water extinction.

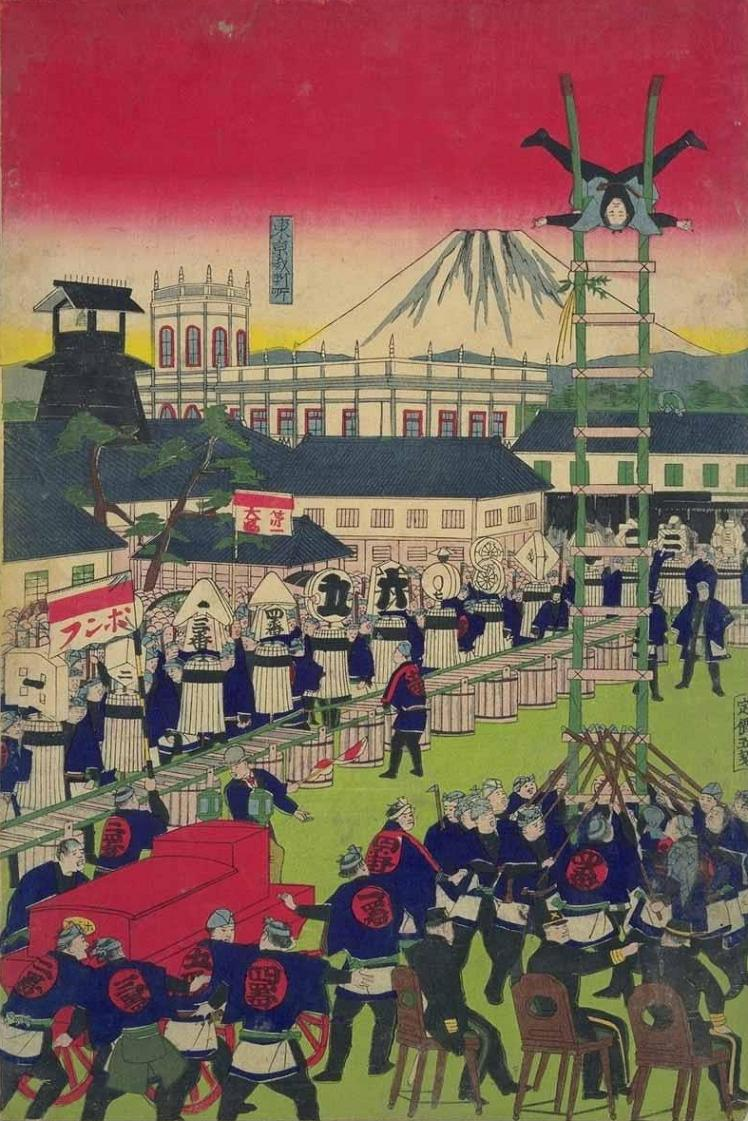
Woodblock print by Hiroshige depicting a firefighter festival, Dezomeshiki

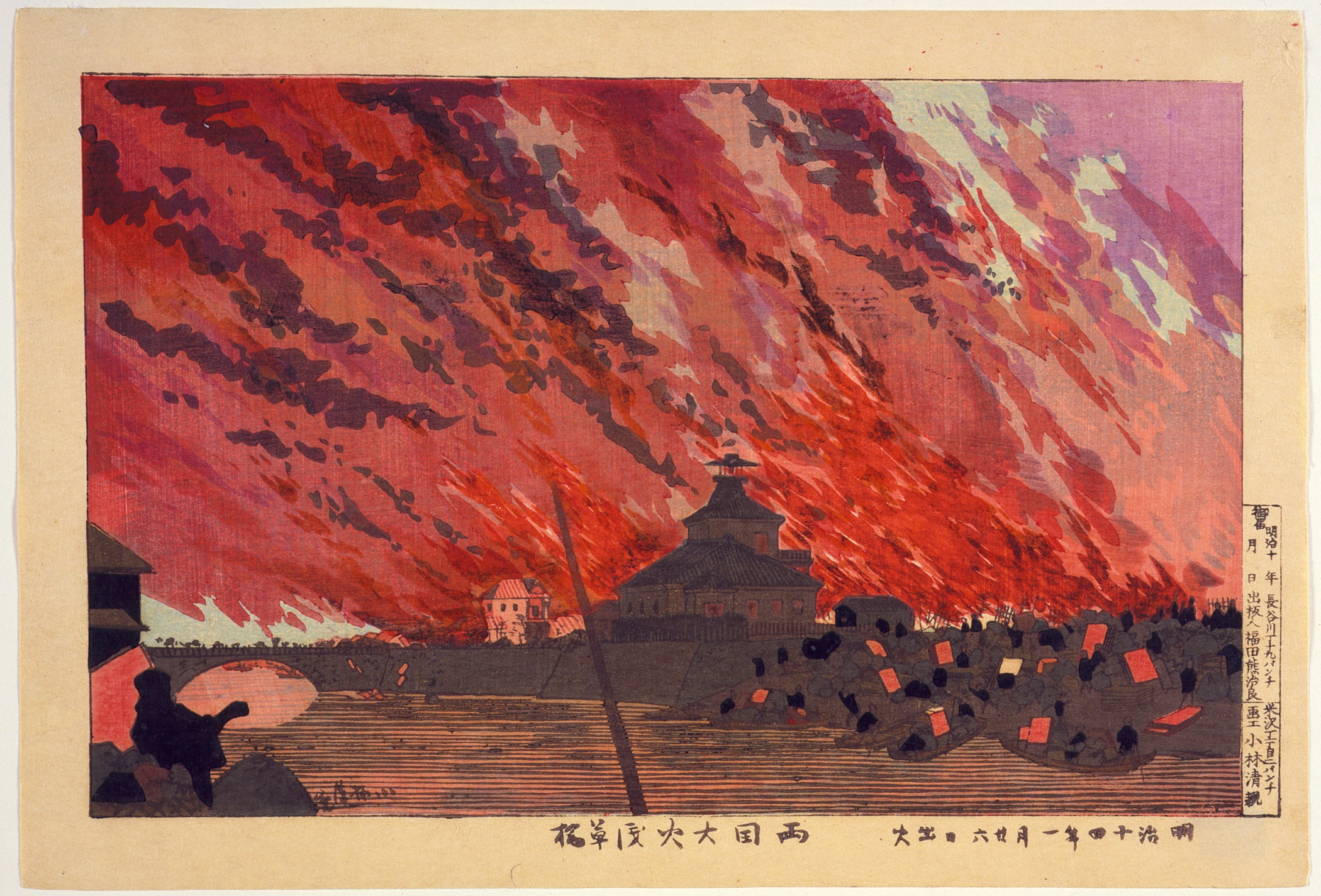
The Great Fire at Ryogoku Bridge

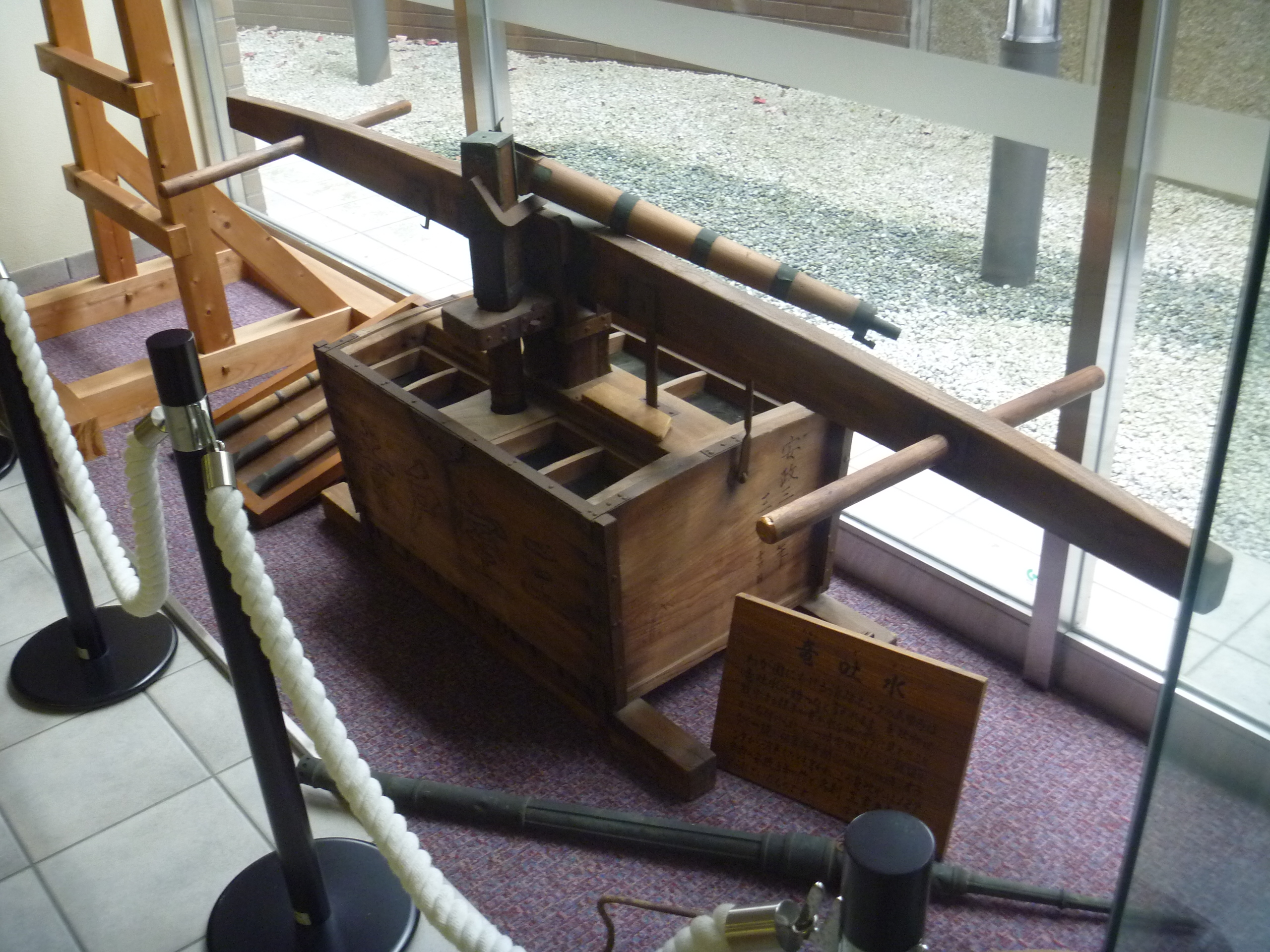
Manual water pump

Japanese water extinguishers

== Daimyo's fire brigades ==
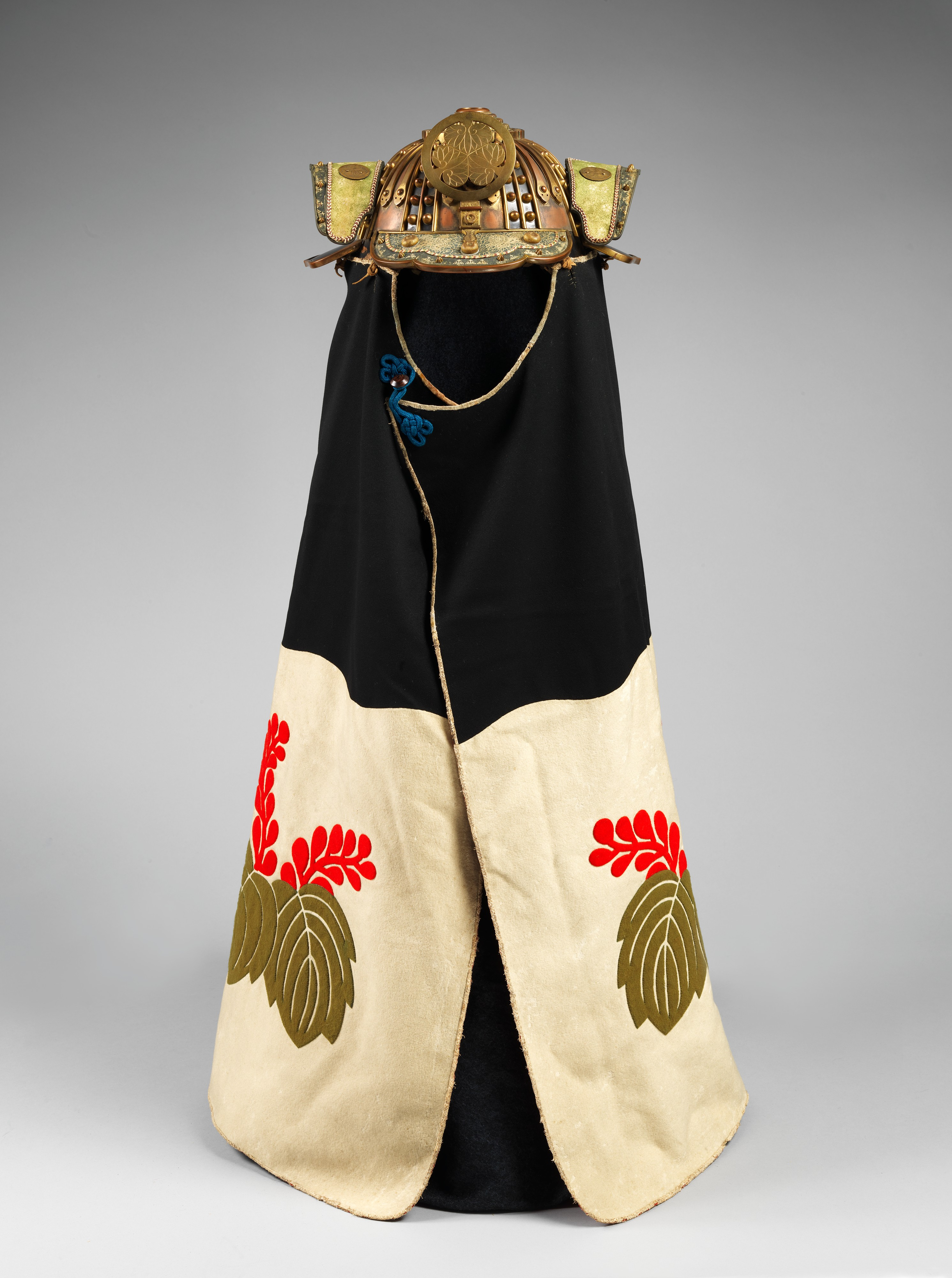
Daimyo's helmet worn during fires

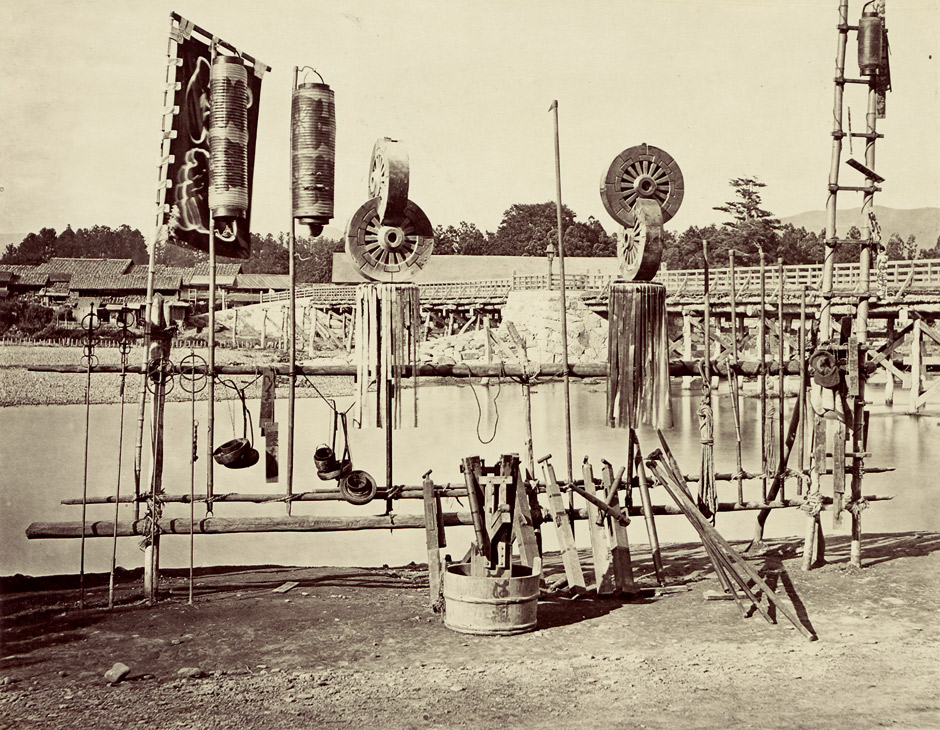
19th-century hikeshi's equipment

In Tokugawa Japan, the fire service depended on the daimyo's management capabilities as they oversaw temporary fire brigades recruitment and controlled their work; these brigades were called daimyo bikeshi. (Note: Japanese: 大名火消し, daimyō bikeshi) Tokugawa era cities were strongholds with a military camp first and foremost, so their administration was not very concerned with the welfare of common folk; they saw the fires as a result of insufficient control over the city population. Edo bureaucrats regularly published orders requiring every town block to build a firewatch tower and assign people to it, as well as mandating a night watch; in 1742, the shogun ruled that the owner of the house where a fire had started was to be arrested for 30 days if the fire spread to the neighbours' houses, and later ordered the same punishment for people who abstained from help in fire extinguishing. The law forbade commoners from lighting candles at the upper floor; to have bathing rooms (they had to use public baths instead), baths and food places had to extinguish their fireplaces after 6 pm; in especially windy days common people were not allowed to leave their houses because they had to watch their house to not catch fire.

Many fires started due to arson; according to a 1870s estimate, arsonists started 40−50% of fires in Edo. Arsonists' motives included getting out of debt, receiving a subsidy for restoration of their housing and getting more jobs in construction. Tokugawa administration violently persecuted arsonists: they tortured people suspected in arson and organised public executions, although the fact that about half of the executed people belonged to the lowest social class (hinin) or were vagabonds (Note: Japanese: 無宿, mushuku) suggests that maintaining the social hierarchy was equally important. At the same time, the shogunate strengthened their authority by giving the fire victims money and food. Arson was condemned to the extent that arson allegations became an effective form of blackmailing: a wooden tablet or a paper note with such allegation (Note: Japanese: 火札, hifuda or kasatsu) was placed at the target's gate or door.

== Permanent fire service ==
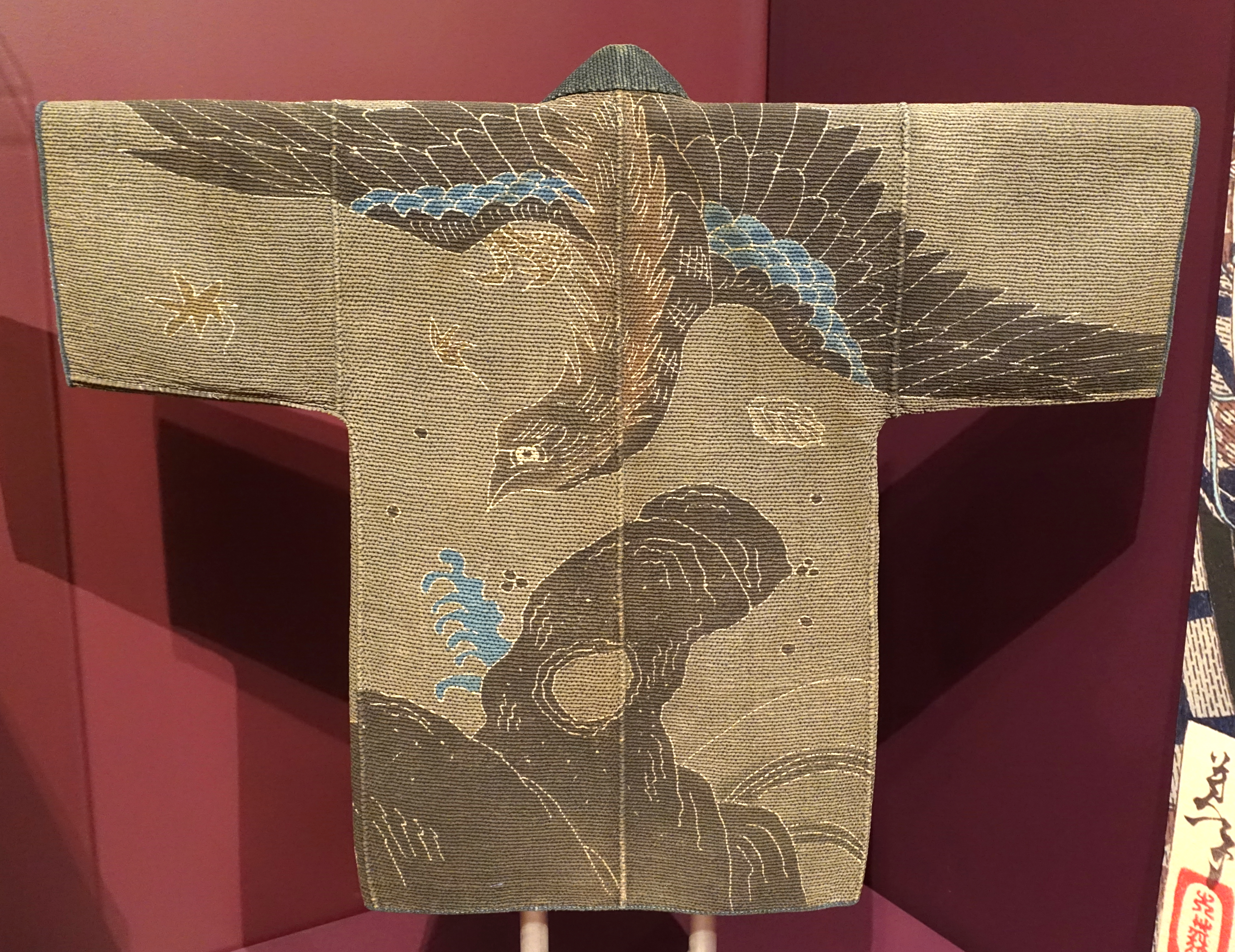
Cotton hikeshi banten depicting a kite, 1800–1850s

After the 1657 Great Fire of Meireki that destroyed most of Edo, shogunate became concerned with fire safety. The new city plan required dividing groups of blocks from each other with wide streets called hiyokechi and hirokoji that protected the rest of Edo from the spread of the fire. In addition to the daimyo-controlled temporary hikeshi brigades, new permanent city fire brigades jo bikeshi (Note: Japanese: 定火消, jō bikeshi) appeared; they worked together with daimyo-bikeshi but mainly concerned with protecting the Edo castle from fires. This was the first permanent fire service in the world; the second one was the London Fire Brigade set up after the 1666 Great Fire of London.

Jo bikeshi were divided into brigades (Note: Japanese: 組, kumi) managed by the ten direct subordinates of the shogun. Other than that, dozens of volunteer fire brigades (machi bikeshi (Note: Japanese: 町火消)) appear, staffed with common city residents.

Hikeshi brigades included experts in speedy demolition, tobi (Japanese: 鳶, lit. kites), hired from construction workers' guilds and roofers; they climbed the burning houses and destroyed their roofs with pike poles called tobiguchi, (Note: Japanese: 鳶口) preventing the fire from spreading further. This technique was only effective with small fires, but its use continued up until the 1880s. Building companies adopted the rapid building and demolition from the tobi, and the latter learnt from the builders.

Other types of hikeshi are: hashigo mochi (Note: Japanese: 梯子持) who carried ladders; hirabito (Note: Japanese: 平人) helped around; matoi mochi (Note: Japanese: 纏持) carried matoi, (Note: Japanese: 纏) a special kind of flag that was raised by fire brigades next to the burning buildings in order to claim their priority. Matoi consisted of a long pole with a lot of paper or fabric ribbons attached to its top along with the fire brigade's logo.

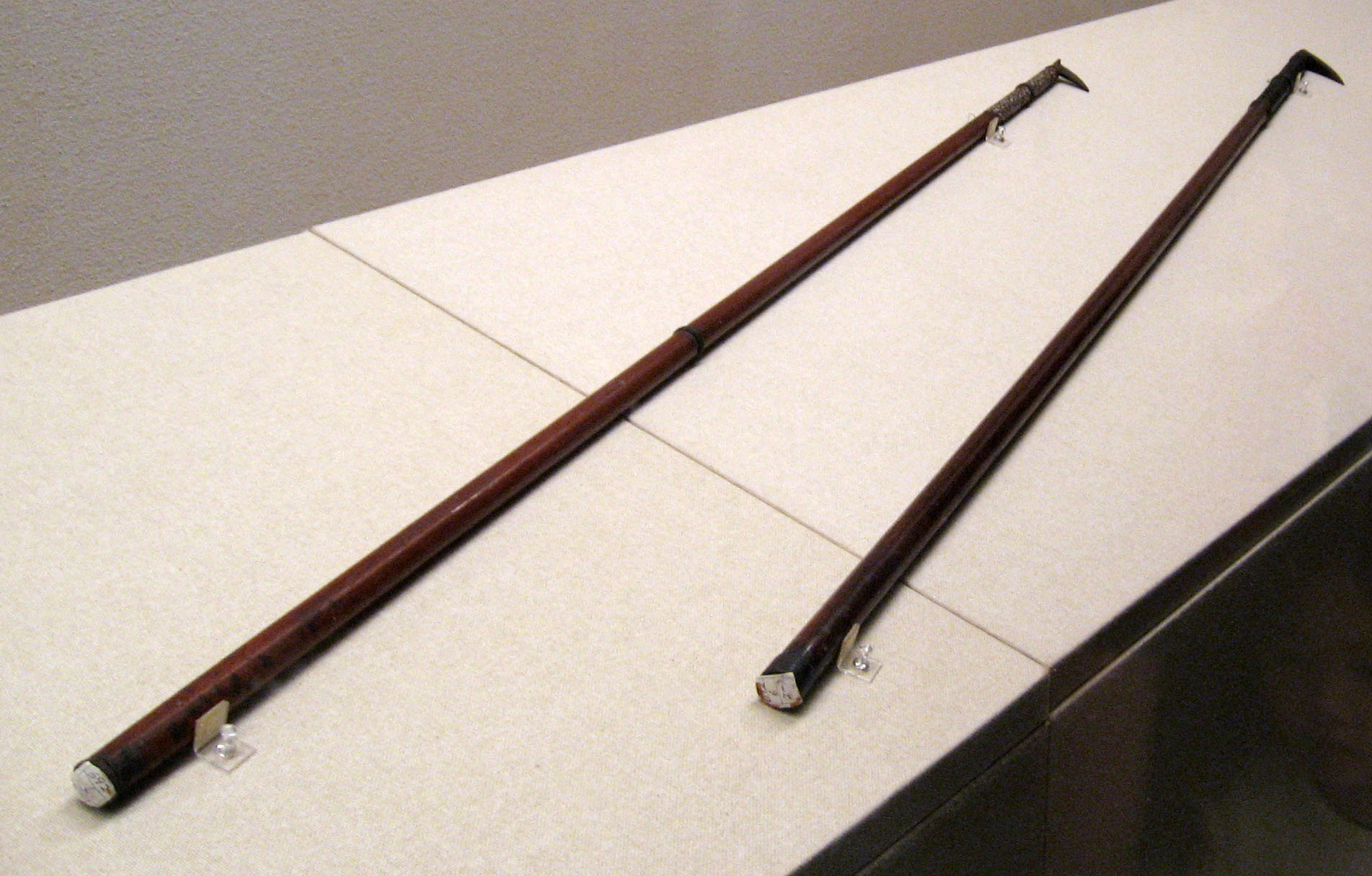
Fire pike poles, tobiguchi

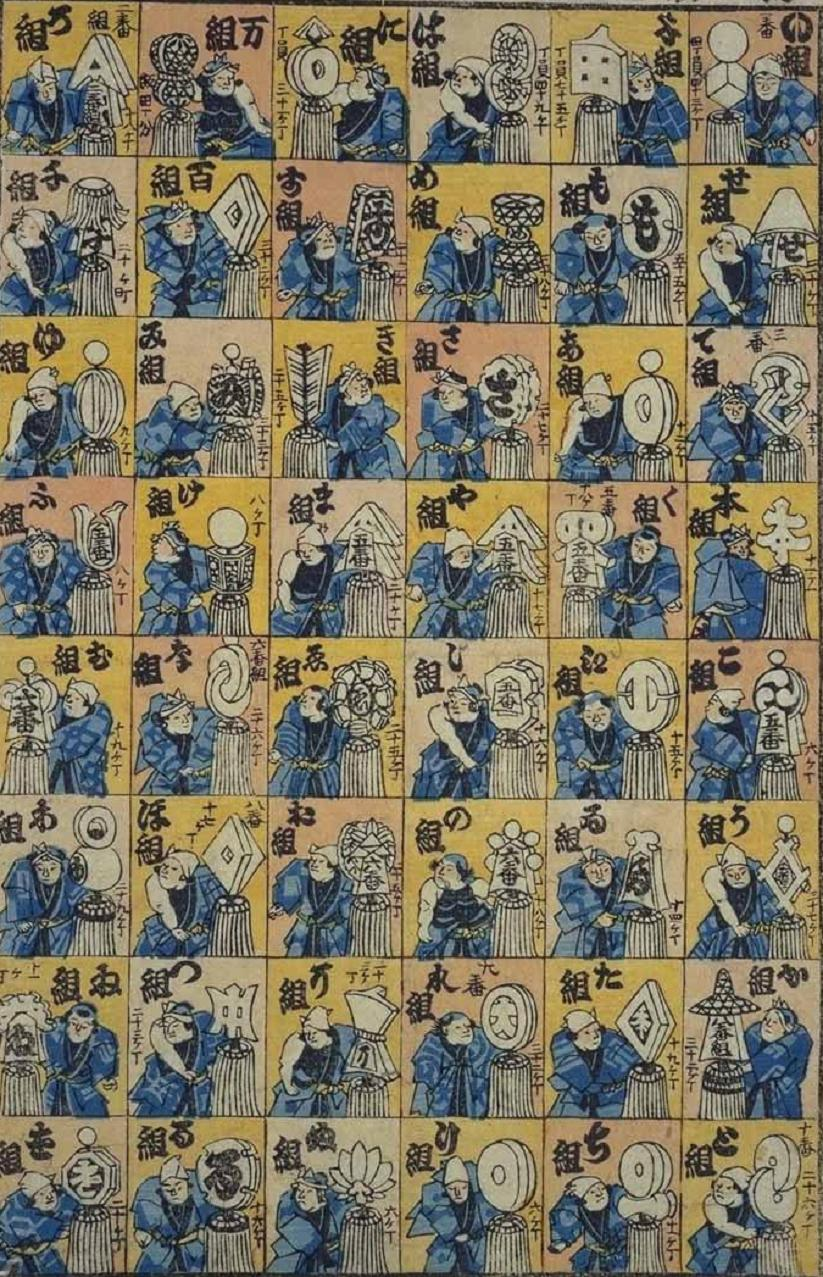
Matoi of different brigades, 1856

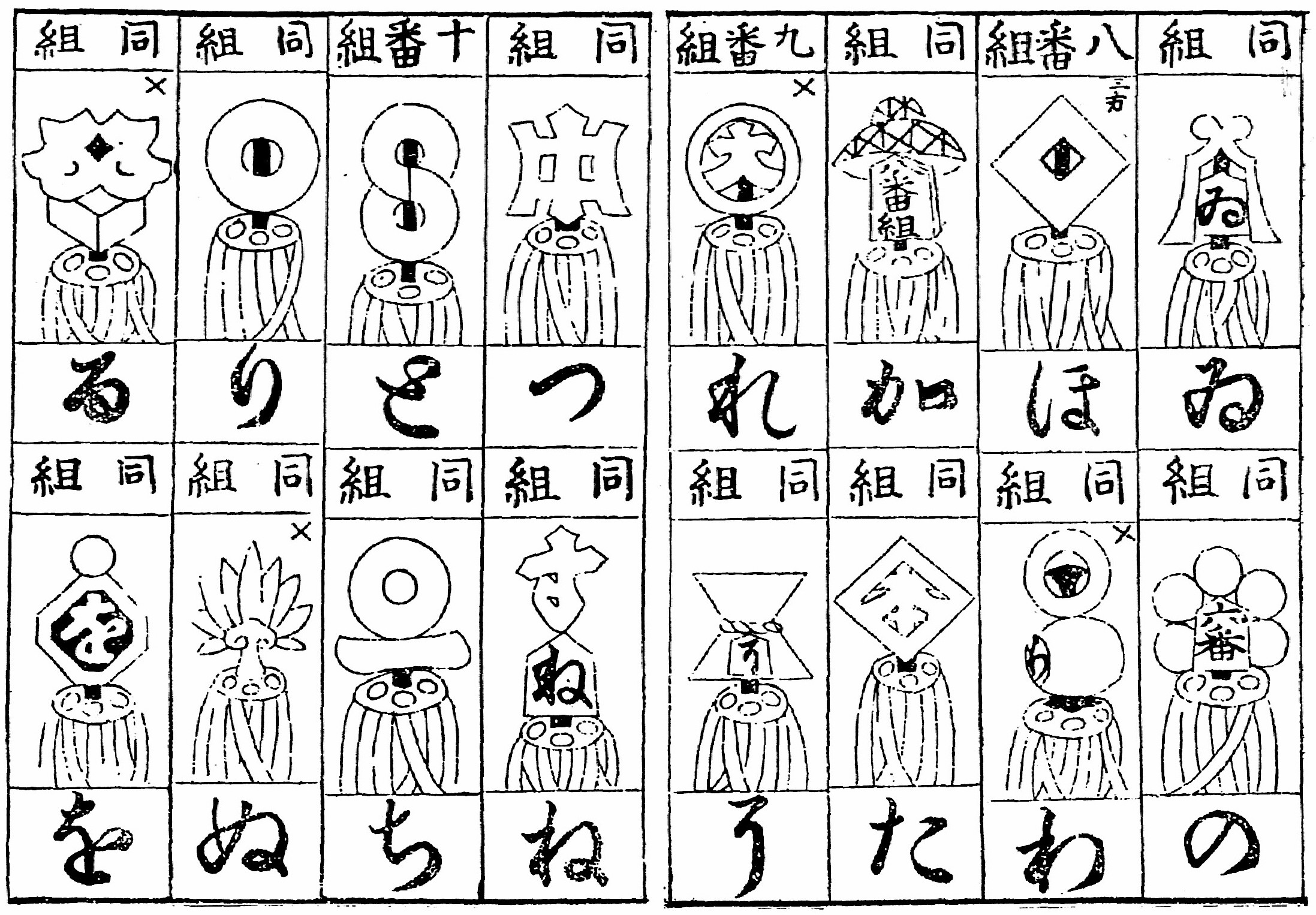
A catalogue of matoi

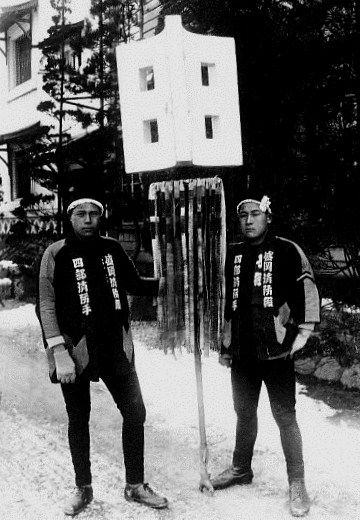
Firefighters with matoi, beginning of 20th century

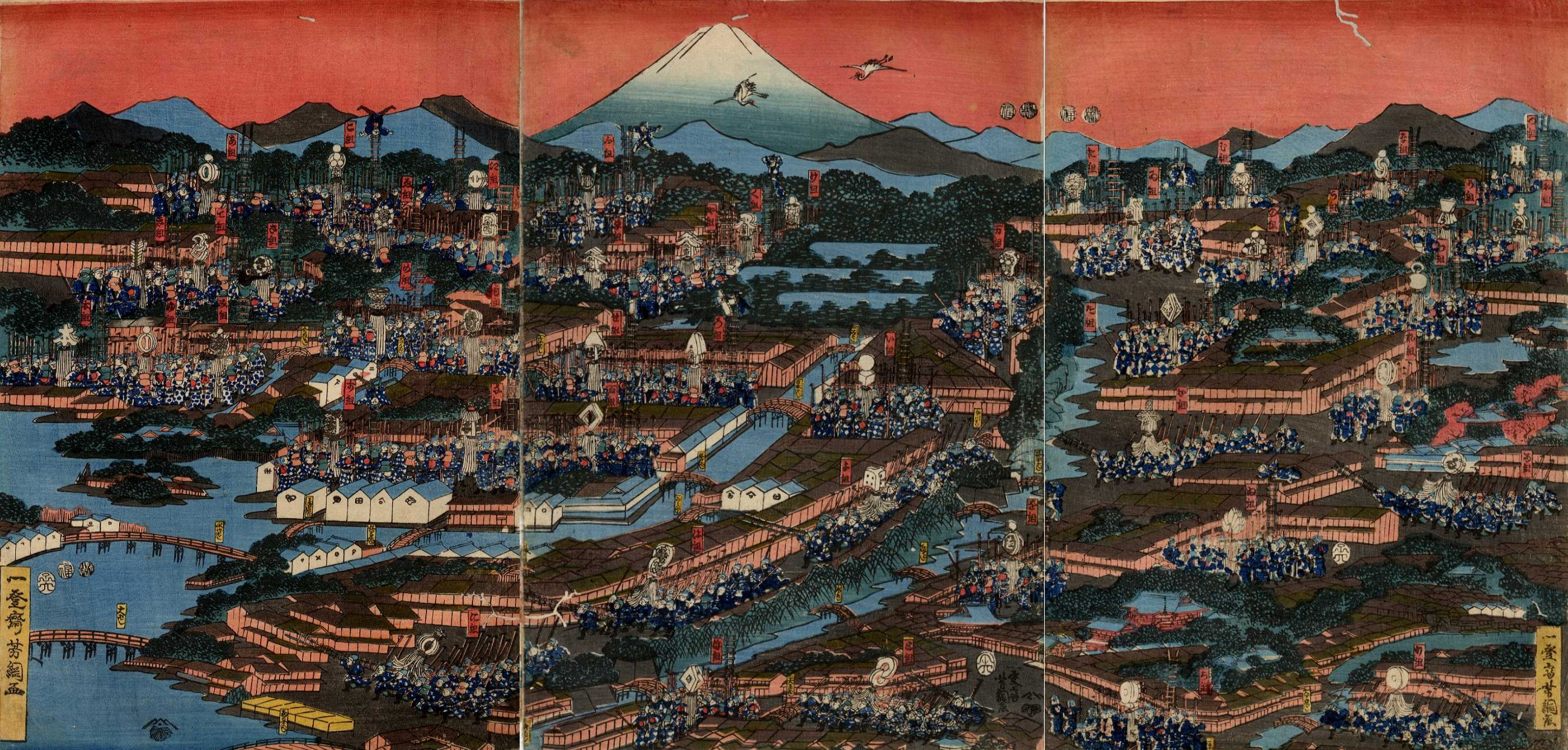
Machi bikeshi in Edo; Utagawa Yoshitsuna

== Volunteer fire service ==
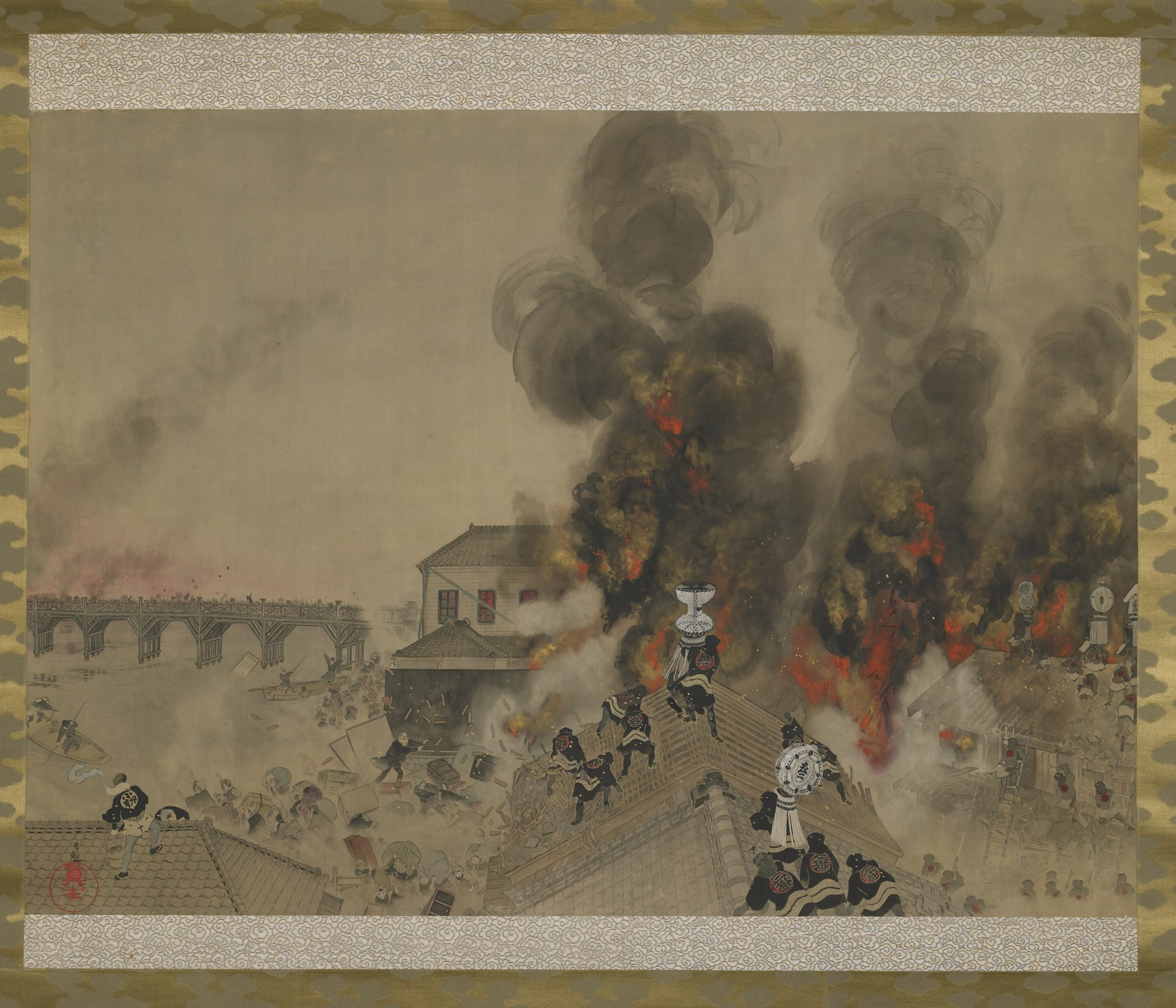
Kobayashi Kiyochika, The Ryōgoku Fire Sketched from Hama-chō, 1881. Hikeshi with matoi are standing at rooftops

In 1700, Edo population reached a million inhabitants; it became the biggest city in the world. In 1718, volunteer fire brigades, machi bikeshi, received an official status. Fire brigades got legally recognised numbers using the Iroha (there were 47 of them in total); every brigade had its own logo that was attached to the matoi. Technically, the samurai-managed brigades were supposed to only fight the fires in samurai blocks while the city brigades were assigned to commoners' housing, but in reality this division could not be maintained, and the brigades competed against each other. In 1747, the authorities specifically called for the machi matoi brigades to extinguish the Edo Castle fire, which became an official acknowledgement of their higher status.

Brigades divided their firefighters into six ranks; all of them received a small allowance that was not enough for permanent employment, so the hikeshi had to accept work in constriction or look for patrons. At the same time, hikeshi were celebrated as city heroes while tobi received the biggest salary among the day laborers. After a fire the owners of the unaffected buildings gifted the brigades with barrels of sake and money, which was the reason why hikeshi hurried to set up their matoi during fires. Sometimes hikeshi brigades fought each other or extorted money from the locals: during the Kanda fire of 1881, the hikeshi demanded to pay them upfront before starting to extinguish the fire. Most of hikeshi were of lower socioeconomic class and were famously stubborn. In the beginning of the 19th century they could intentionally demolish a building or lead the flames to it if its owner was unfriendly with the brigade. Samurai hikeshi brigades were only concerned with "their" buildings' safety during fires in the commoners' blocks; they climbed the roofs and waved enormous hand fans to keep the fire flakes away.

== Japan after the WWII ==
In modern Japan, hikeshi were replaced by a permanent service: Fire and Disaster Management Agency. Matoi are still used during festivals as decor.

Katsuhiro Otomo's short film Combustible (Japanese: 火要鎮, hi no yōjin) from the Short Peace project shows the work of a premodern fire brigade in detail.
