= Umeko Ando =

Ainu musician

- Ando, undated

Background information
- Born: November 20, 1932
- Origin: Husikokotan, Obihiro, Hokkaidō, Japan
- Died: July 15, 2004 (aged 71)
- Genre: Ainu
- Instrument: Mukkuri
- Years active: 1960–2003

Umeko Ando (安東 ウメ子, Andō Umeko; November 20, 1932 – July 15, 2004) was an Ainu singer and mukkuri player. Her participation in Oki Kano's second album Hankapuy was the first time she gained recognition. She recorded her solo debut album, Ihunke, produced by Oki in 2001. It was followed by her second studio album, Upopo Sanke, in 2003.

== Biography ==
She was born in Obihiro, Hokkaido, Japan in 1932. From a young age, she was passionate about singing and playing the mukkuri. She sang in the traditional Ainu style, but also trained in Min'yō music. She soon became influential in the mukkuri-playing community and also served in the Ainu Cultural Preservation Society in Obihiro. She moved to Makubetsu, Hokkaido after she married.

She met Oki Kano in the late 1990s: he later described her as being "someone special" and "lov[ing] new challenges". He ultimately chose to produce and play in her solo debut album, Ihunke, which was recorded in 2000 at his house. Many of the songs were improvisations over traditional Tonkori tunes. This album was the first time Sakhalin Ainu and Obihiro Ainu worked together to make an album, and was the first entirely Ainu-produced album. It would later be re-released as a vinyl posthumously in 2018. According to Oki, it was named one of the best world music albums of the year by multiple Japanese publications.

Her second album, Upopo Sanke, was recorded at a farm in Tokachi Subprefecture in 2003. It was compared to indie rock by Spectrum Culture in its review, and was rated 4/5 stars by the same publication. It was re-released in 2023.

== Death and legacy ==
She died from cancer on July 15, 2004, at her hometown Makubetsu-cho, Hokkaido, at the age of 71.

She is featured posthumously on the Samurai Champloo soundtrack with her song "Pekambe Uk" (ペカンベ ウㇰ; "Wheat Harvesting Song"). The seventeenth episode, "Lullabies of the Lost", which featured this song, was dedicated to her memory with the message "May her soul rest in peace" in the ending credits. She was also posthumously featured on Amamiaynu, an album created by her collaborator Ikue Asazaki. A song she collaborated on with Oki was re-released in his 2022 best-of album. The Makubetsu Town Ainu Cultural Center held a special exhibition of her and her life in 2026.

NTS Radio created a one-hour mix of only her works in 2025. Her performances were utilized to create a sound library. A CD and a DVD of her were produced by her hometown.

== Discography ==
- Ihunke (2001)
- Upopo Sanke (2003)
- Keutowm
