= Ainu fiddle =

Japanese stringed musical instrument

Several types of Ainu fiddle have been described by anthropologists of the Ainu people of Northern Japan and the adjoining Russian Far East islands of Sakhalin and Kuril.

The missionary-anthropologist John Batchelor noted of the Sakhalin Ainu (1901):

The Ainu of Saghlien make a sort of fiddle, some with two, some with three, and others with four or even more strings, according to caprice. There are several of these to be seen in the Sapporo Museum, and others are found among some of those Ishkari Ainu who originally came down from Saghalien when that island was ceded to Russia.

And further of those of Karafuto (1892):

The Karafuto Ainu are said to have a kind of fiddle with two strings, and another with three, but I have never seen these.

== See also ==
- Ainu music
- Tonkori
