= Head =

Cephalic part of an animal

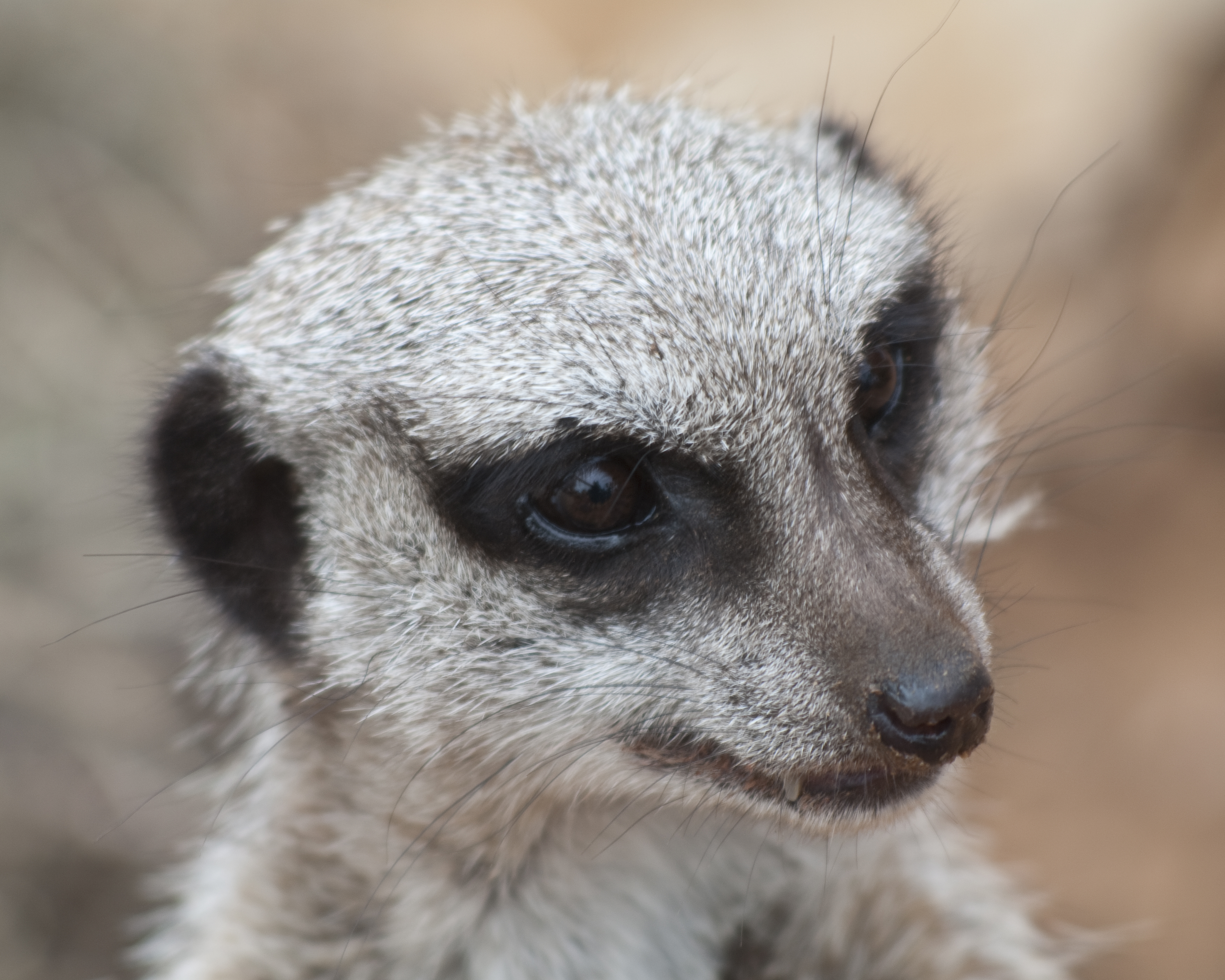
- The head of a meerkat

Details

Identifiers
- Latin: caput
- Greek: κεφαλή (kephalḗ)
- TA98: A01.1.00.001
- TA2: 98
- FMA: 7154

A head is the part of an organism which usually includes the ears, brain, forehead, cheeks, chin, eyes, nose, and mouth, each of which aids in various sensory functions such as sight, hearing, smell, and taste. Some very simple animals may not have a head, but many bilaterally symmetric forms do, regardless of size.

Heads develop in animals by an evolutionary trend known as cephalization. In bilaterally symmetrical animals, nervous tissue concentrates at the anterior region, forming structures responsible for information processing. Through biological evolution, sense organs and feeding structures also concentrate into the anterior region; these collectively form the head.

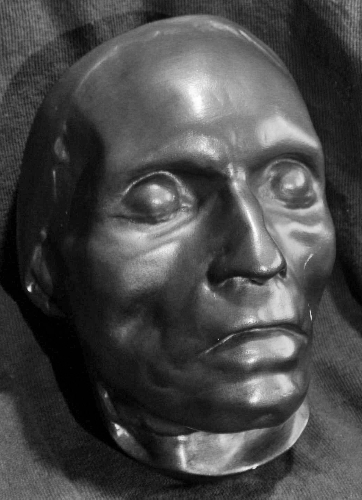
The head of a death mask

== Human head ==
The human head is an anatomical unit that consists of the skull, hyoid bone and cervical vertebrae. The skull consists of the brain case which encloses the cranial cavity, and the facial skeleton, which includes the mandible. There are eight bones in the brain case and fourteen in the facial skeleton.

Sculptures of human heads are generally based on a skeletal structure that consists of a cranium, jawbone, and cheekbone. Though the number of muscles making up the face is generally consistent between sculptures, the shape of the muscles varies widely based on the function, development, and expressions reflected on the faces of the subjects.

Proponents of identism believe that the mind is identical to the brain. Philosopher John Searle asserts his identist beliefs, stating "the brain is the only thing in the human head". Similarly, Dr. Henry Bennet-Clark has stated that the head encloses billions of "miniagents and microagents (with no single Boss)".

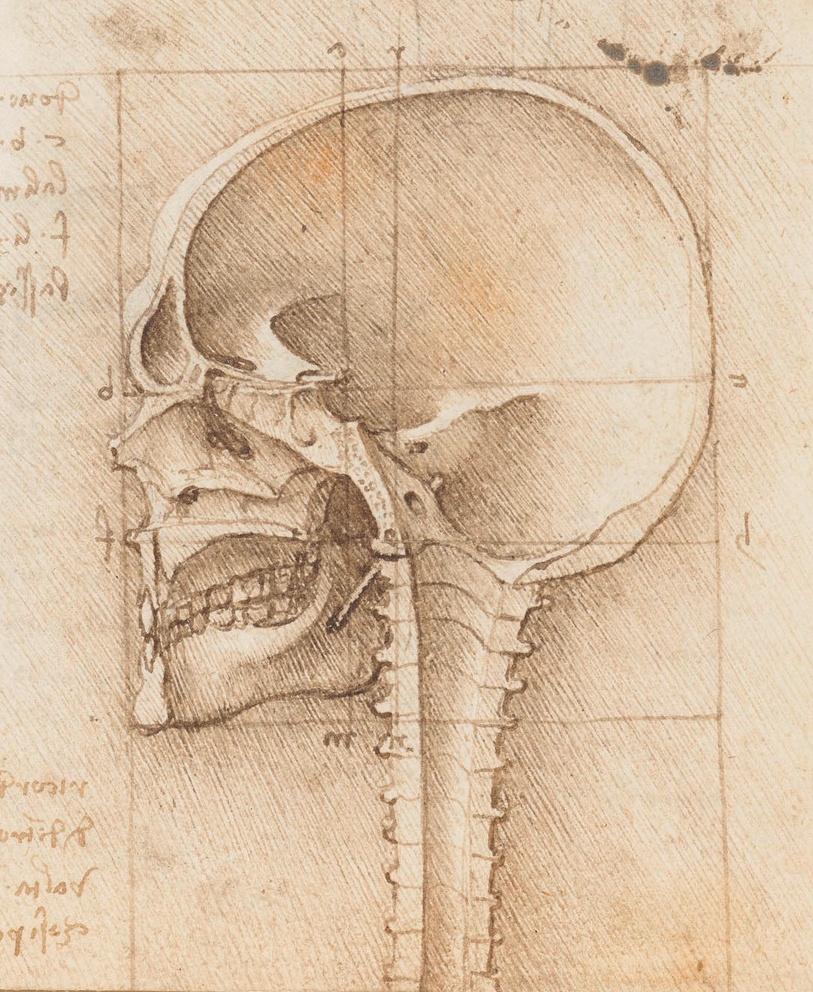
Mid-sagittal section of a human skull, by Leonardo da Vinci, c. 1489

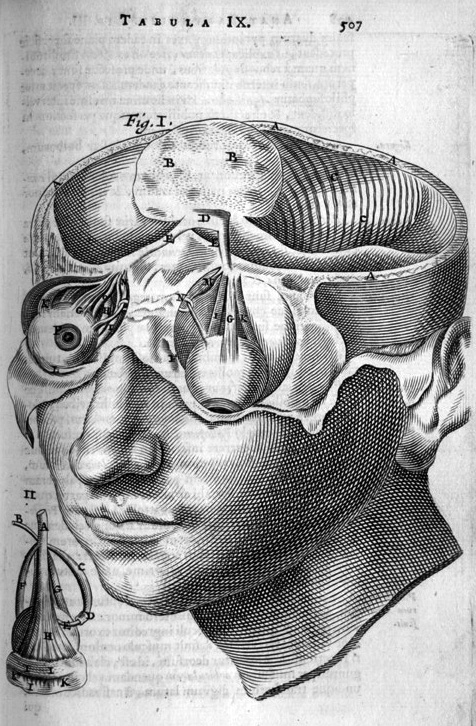
Transection of a human head, by Thomas Bartholin, 1673

== Other animals ==
The evolution of a head is associated with the cephalization that occurred in Bilateria some 555 million years ago.

=== Arthropods ===
In some arthropods, especially trilobites, the cephalon, or cephalic region, is the region of the head which is a collective of "fused segments".

==== Insects ====
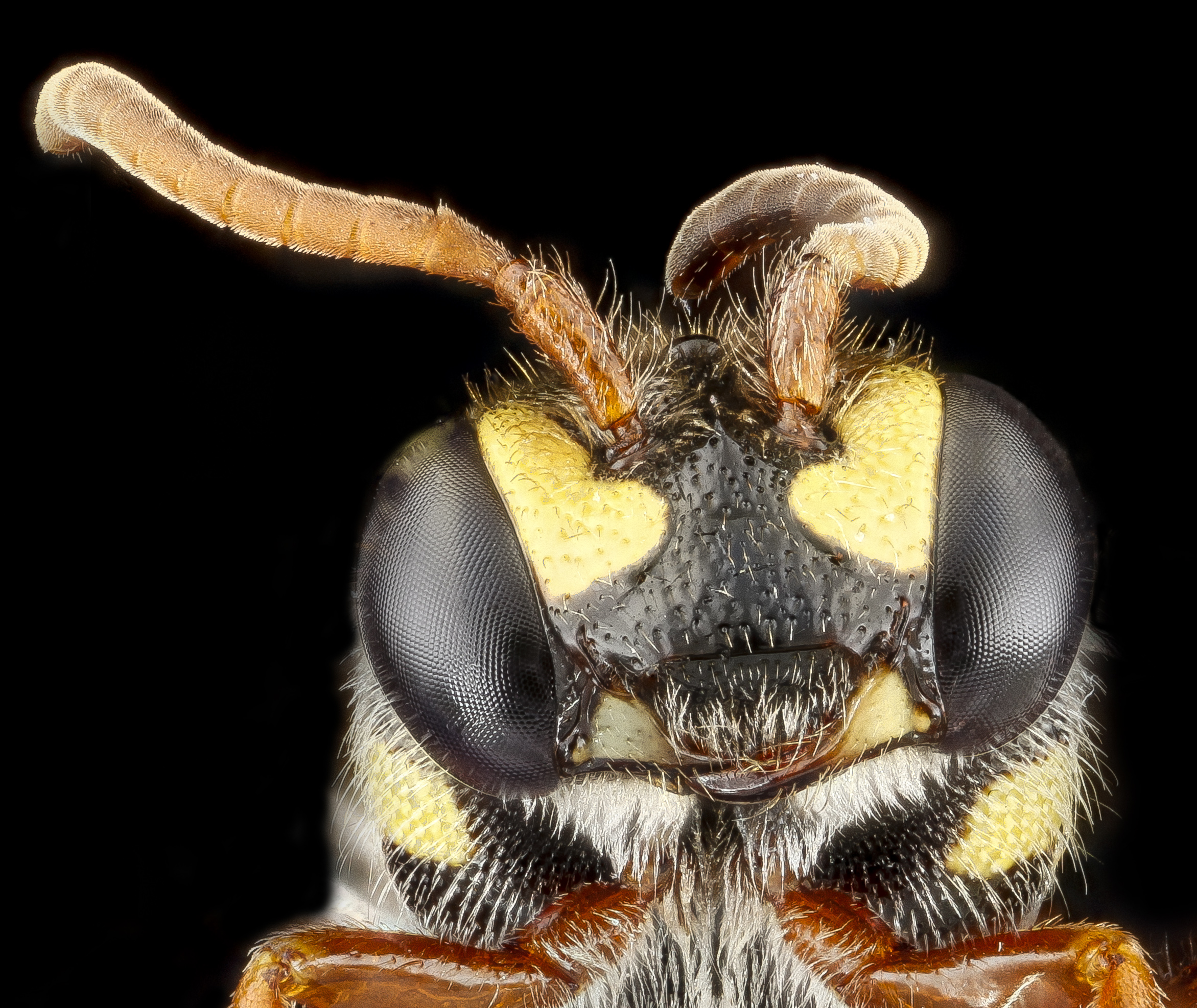
Head of a Nomada-species bee

A typical insect head is composed of eyes, antennae, and components of mouth. As these components differ substantially from insect to insect, they form important identification links. Eyes in the head found, in several types of insects, are in the form of a pair of compound eyes with multiple faces. In many other types of insects, the compound eyes are seen in a "single facet or group of single facets". In some cases, the eyes may be seen as marks on the dorsal or located near or toward the head, two or three ocelli (single faceted organs).

Antennae on the insect's head is found in the form of segmented attachments, in pairs, that are usually located between the eyes. These are in varying shapes and sizes, in the form of filaments or in different enlarged or clubbed form.

Insects have mouth parts in various shapes depending on their feeding habits. Labrum is the "upper lip" which is in the front area of the head and is the most exterior part. A pair of mandibles is found on the backside of the labrum flanking the side of the mouth, succeeded by a pair of maxillae each of which is known as maxilliary palp. At the back side of the mouth is the labium or lower lip. There is also an extra mouth part in some insects which is termed as hypopharynx which is usually located between the maxillac.

=== Vertebrates and the "new head hypothesis" ===
Though invertebrate chordates – such as the tunicate larvae or the lancelets – have heads, there has been a question of how the vertebrate head, characterized by a bony skull clearly separated from the main body, might have evolved from the head structures of these animals.

According to Hyman (1979), the evolution of the head in the vertebrates has occurred by the fusion of a fixed number of anterior segments, in the same manner as in other "heteronomously segmented animals". In some cases, segments or a portion of the segments disappear. The head segments also lose most of their systems, except for the nervous system. With the progressive development of cephalization, "the head incorporates more and more of the adjacent segments into its structure, so that in general it may be said that the higher the degree of cephalization the greater is the number of segments composing the head".

In the 1980s, the "new head hypothesis" was proposed, suggesting that the vertebrate head is an evolutionary novelty resulting from the emergence of neural crest and cranial placodes. In 2014, a transient larva tissue of the lancelet was found to be virtually indistinguishable from the neural crest-derived cartilage which forms the vertebrate skull, suggesting that persistence of this tissue and expansion into the entire headspace could be a viable evolutionary route to formation of the vertebrate head.

== In society and culture ==
=== Art ===
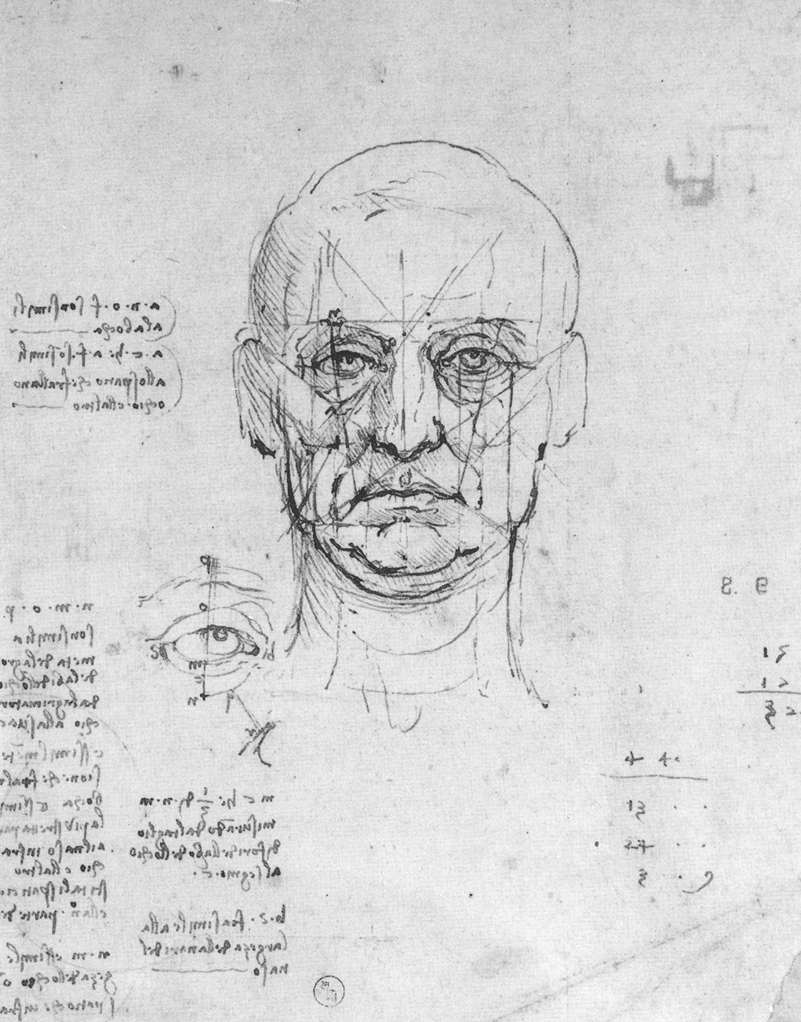
Study on the proportions of head and eyes by Leonardo da Vinci

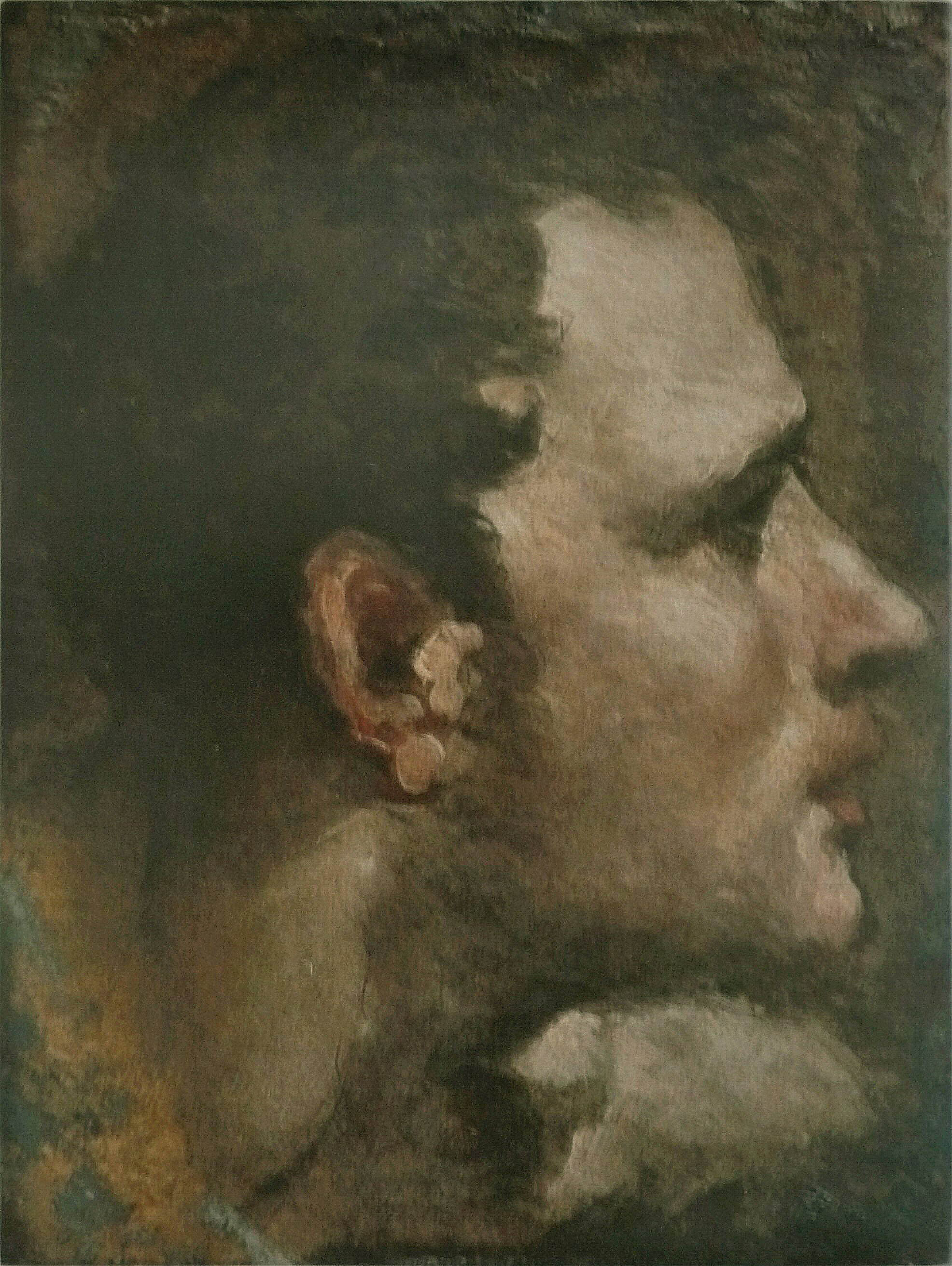
"Head of a young man" – Domenico Beccafumi

One of the ways of drawing sketches of heads—as Jack Hamm advises—is to develop it in six well-defined steps, starting with the shape of the head in the shape of an egg. The female head, in particular, is sketched in a double circle design procedure with proportions considered as an ideal of a female head. In the first circle, the division is made of five sections on the diameter, each section of five eyes width. It is then developed over a series of ten defined steps, with the smaller circle imposed partially over the larger circle at the lower end at the fourth stage. Eyes and chins are fitted in various shapes to form the head.

Leonardo da Vinci, considered one of the world's greatest artists, drew sketches of human anatomy using grid structures. His image of the face drawn on the grid structure principle is in perfect proportion. In this genre, using the technique of pen and ink, Leonardo created a sketch which is a "Study on the proportions of head and eyes" (pictured).

=== Cuisine ===
Slaughtered animal heads are a variety of offal or variety meat. The head as offal can be subdivided into the brain, ears, eyes, face meat (further, into choice cuts like jowl), and tongue.

Animal heads are typically necessarily included in 'whole animal' preparations, such as pig roasts and barbacoa. Whole animal cooking is prominent in seafood.

Cooked severed heads are a delicacy in multiple cuisines:

- Cabeza is a variety of Mexican barbacoa featuring pit-roasted livestock heads.
- Tête de veau is a Western European dish made from the head of a calf.
- Sheep heads are eaten whole in many cultures: Scandinavian cuisine, as smalahove or svið; South Africa, as intkoko yemvu or 'smileys'; and Kazakhstan, as a boiled dish.
- Severed fish heads are a widely accepted ingredient for fish stock, as well as being a delicacy: a prominent example is fish head curry in Southeast Asia.
- Choice pluck from the head is used to make Head cheese/brawn.

=== Heraldry ===
The flag of Corsica displays a head in profile view

The heads of humans and other animals are commonly recurring charges in heraldry. Heads of humans are sometimes blazoned simply as a "man's head", but are far more frequently described in greater detail, either characteristic of a particular race or nationality (such as Moors' heads, Saxons' heads, Egyptians' heads or Turks' heads), or specifically identified (such as the head of Moses in the crest of Hilton, or the head of St. John the Baptist in the crest of the London Company of Tallowchandlers). Several varieties of women's heads also occur, including maidens' heads (often couped under the bust, with hair disheveled), ladies' heads, nuns' heads (often veiled), and occasionally queens' heads. The arms of Devaney of Norfolk include "three nun's heads veiled couped at the shoulders proper," and the bust of a queen occurs in the arms of Queenborough, Kent. Infants' or children's heads are often couped at the shoulders with a snake wrapped around the neck (e.g. "Argent, a boy's head proper, crined or, couped below the shoulders, vested gules, tarnished gold," in the arms of Boyman).

=== Idiomatic expressions ===
An idiom is a phrase or a fixed expression that has a figurative, or sometimes literal, meaning.

- "To be big-headed" - to be overly full of oneself
- "To come to a head" – to reach a critical stage and require immediate action
- "To bite someone's head off" – to criticize someone strongly
- "Can't make head or tail of something" – cannot understand something
- "A head start" – an early start that provides an advantage over others
- "Head and shoulders above someone or something" – better than someone or something in some way
- "To want someone's head on a platter" – to want someone severely punished
- "To bang your head against a brick wall" – to continually try to achieve something without success
- "To have one's head in the clouds" – to not pay attention to what is happening around one because one is so absorbed by one's own thoughts

== Gallery ==
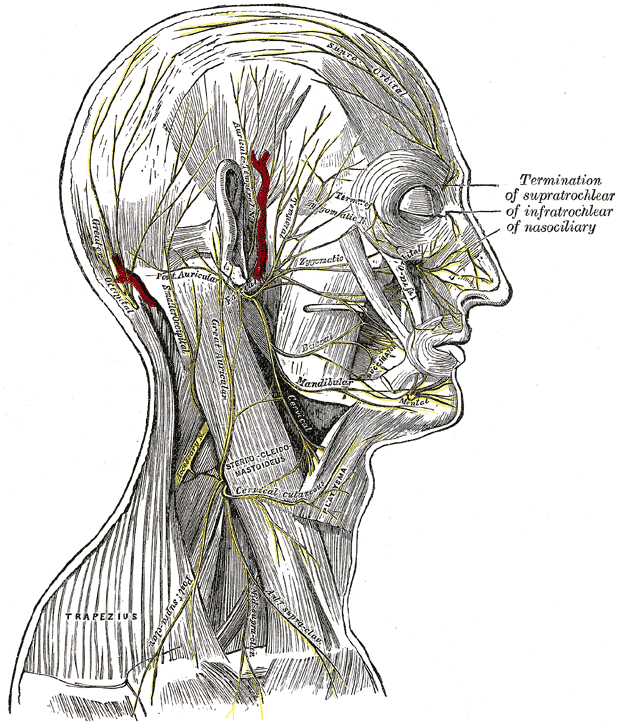
Nerves of the human head, from Gray's Anatomy, 1858

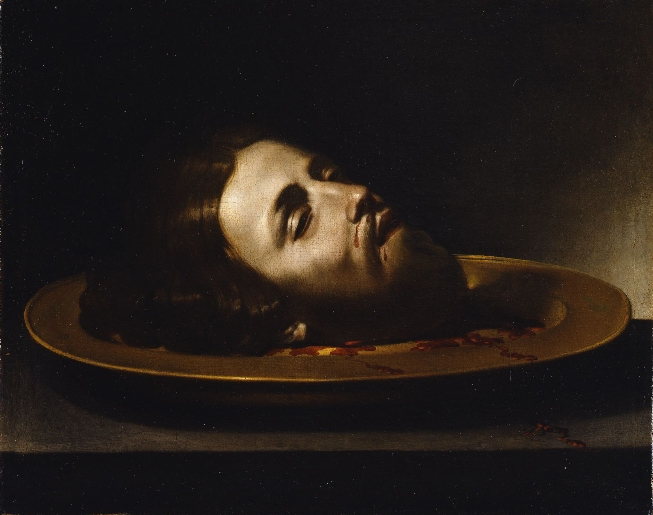
Head of St. John the Baptist by Andrea Vaccaro, oil on canvas, 17th century

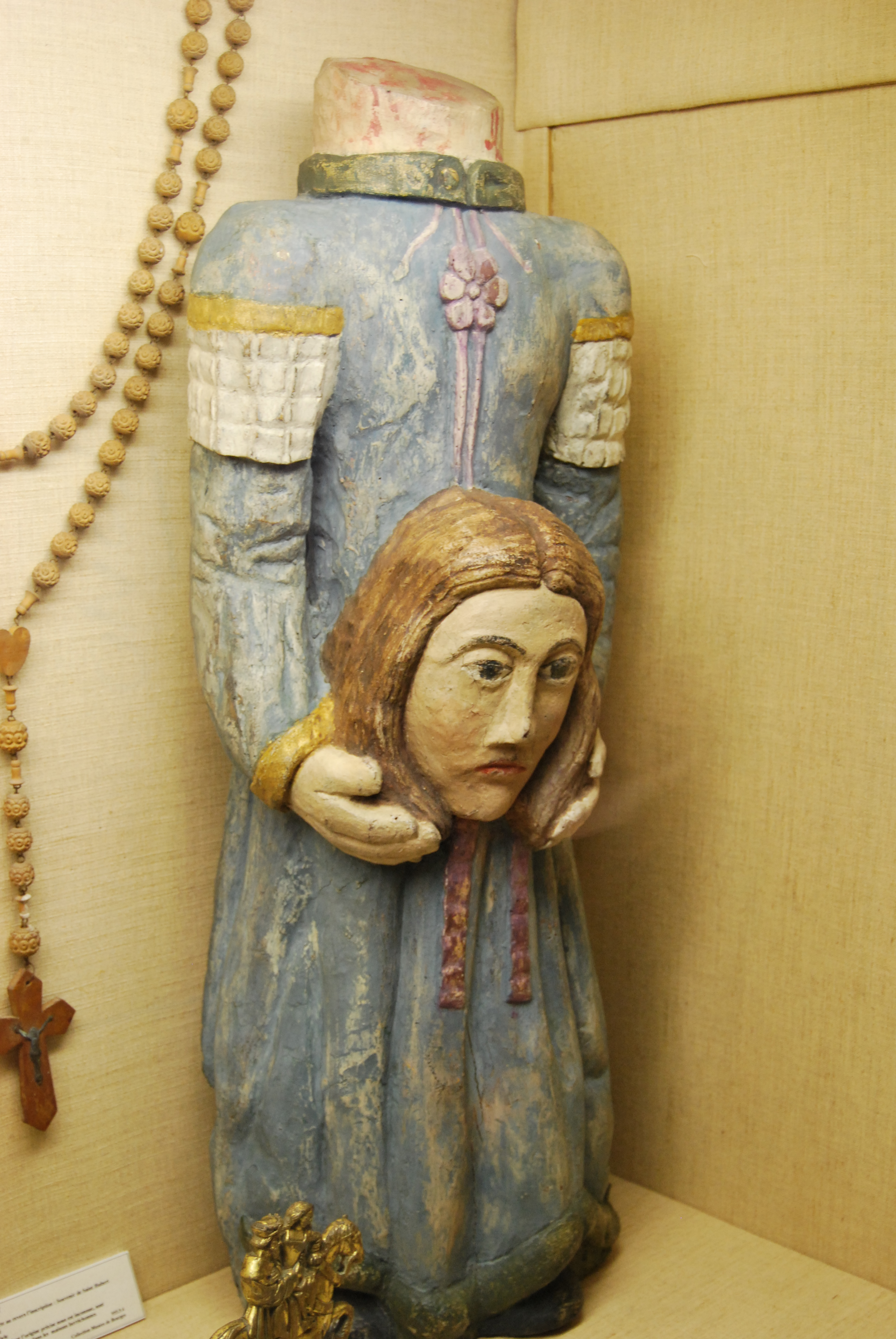
Sculpture of the beheaded Saint Solange, patron saint of the French province of Berry

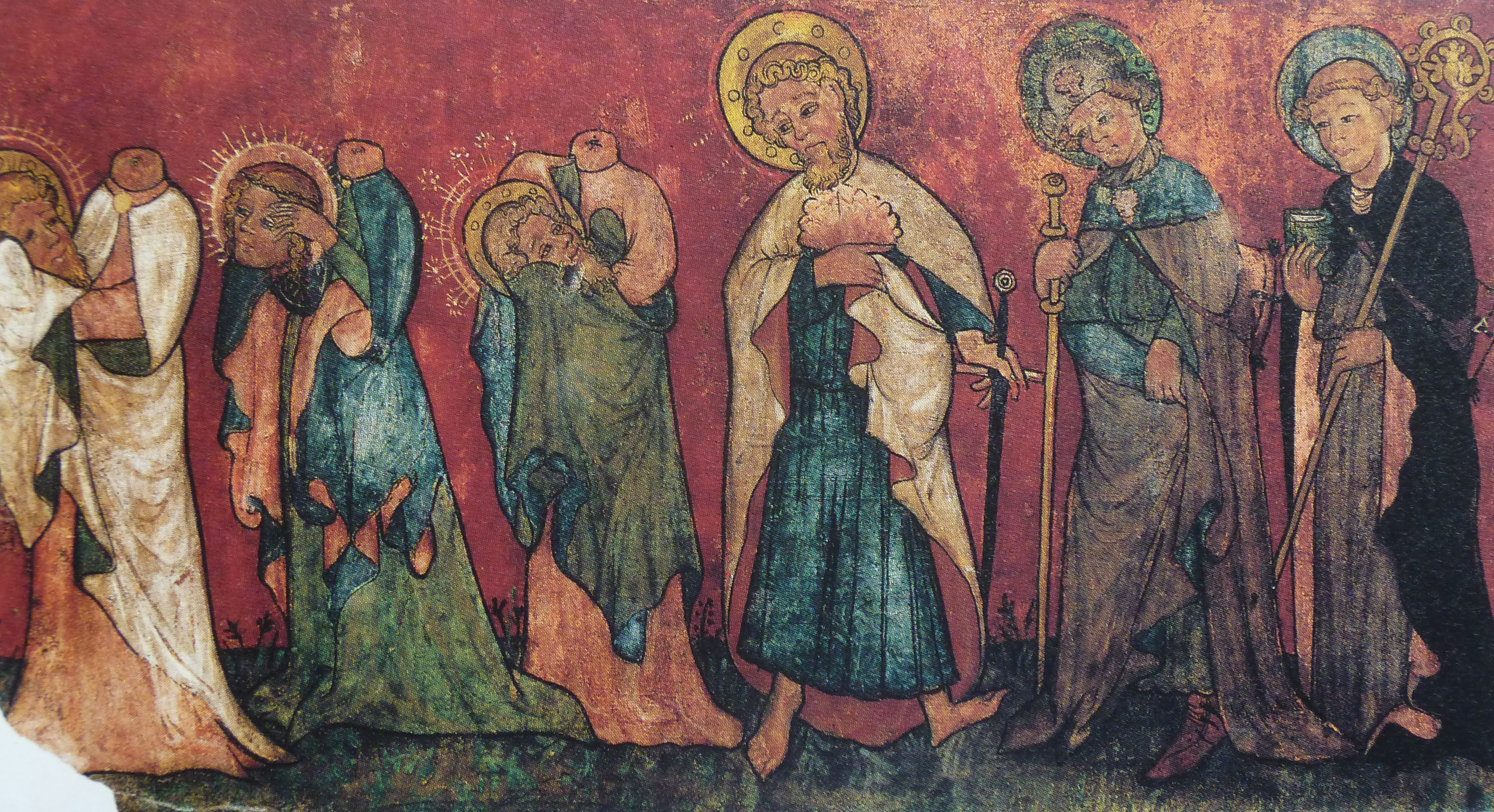
Patron saints of Zürich, fresco, c. 1400–1425

Heraldic depiction of a bison head cabossed

== See also ==
- Cephalic disorder
- Cephalic flexure
- Cephalic index
- Cephalic phase
- Cephalic presentation
- Cephalic vein
- Circle of Animals/Zodiac Heads – an artwork by Chinese contemporary artist and political commentator Ai Weiwei
- Cynocephaly – a characteristic of having the head of a dog or of a jackal. It is a widely attested mythical phenomenon existing in many forms and contexts.
- Khutang – a type of harp often surmounted by a carven animal head, often a swan
- Theriocephaly – in some religious beliefs, the condition or quality of having the head of an animal, commonly used to refer the depiction in art of humans (or deities) with animal heads
