= Ostyak (disambiguation) =

Ostyak is a name formerly used to refer to several indigenous peoples in Siberia.

Ostyak may also refer to:

== Ethnic groups ==
- Khanty people or Ostyaks, indigenous people in Khanty–Mansi Autonomous Okrug, Russia
- Ket people or Yenisei Ostyaks, indigenous people of the Yenisei River basin, Krasnoyarsk Krai district, Russia
- Selkup people or Ostyak-Samoyeds, indigenous people in Tomsk Oblast, Krasnoyarsk Krai, Yamalo-Nenets Autonomous Okrug, and Nenets Autonomous Okrug, Russia
- Perm (Ostyak) Tatars, a subgroup of the Volga Tatars ethnic group

== Language ==
- Yenisei-Ostyak, a language family whose languages are spoken in central Siberia
- Khanty language or Ostyak, language mainly spoken by the Khanty people
- Ket language or Yenisei Ostyak, the sole surviving language of a Yeniseian language family
- Selkup language, a language in the Samoyedic group of the Uralic language family mainly spoken by the Selkup people

== See also ==
- Khutang or Ostyak harp, a type of harp played by the Khanty and Mansi people
