= Ainu dance =

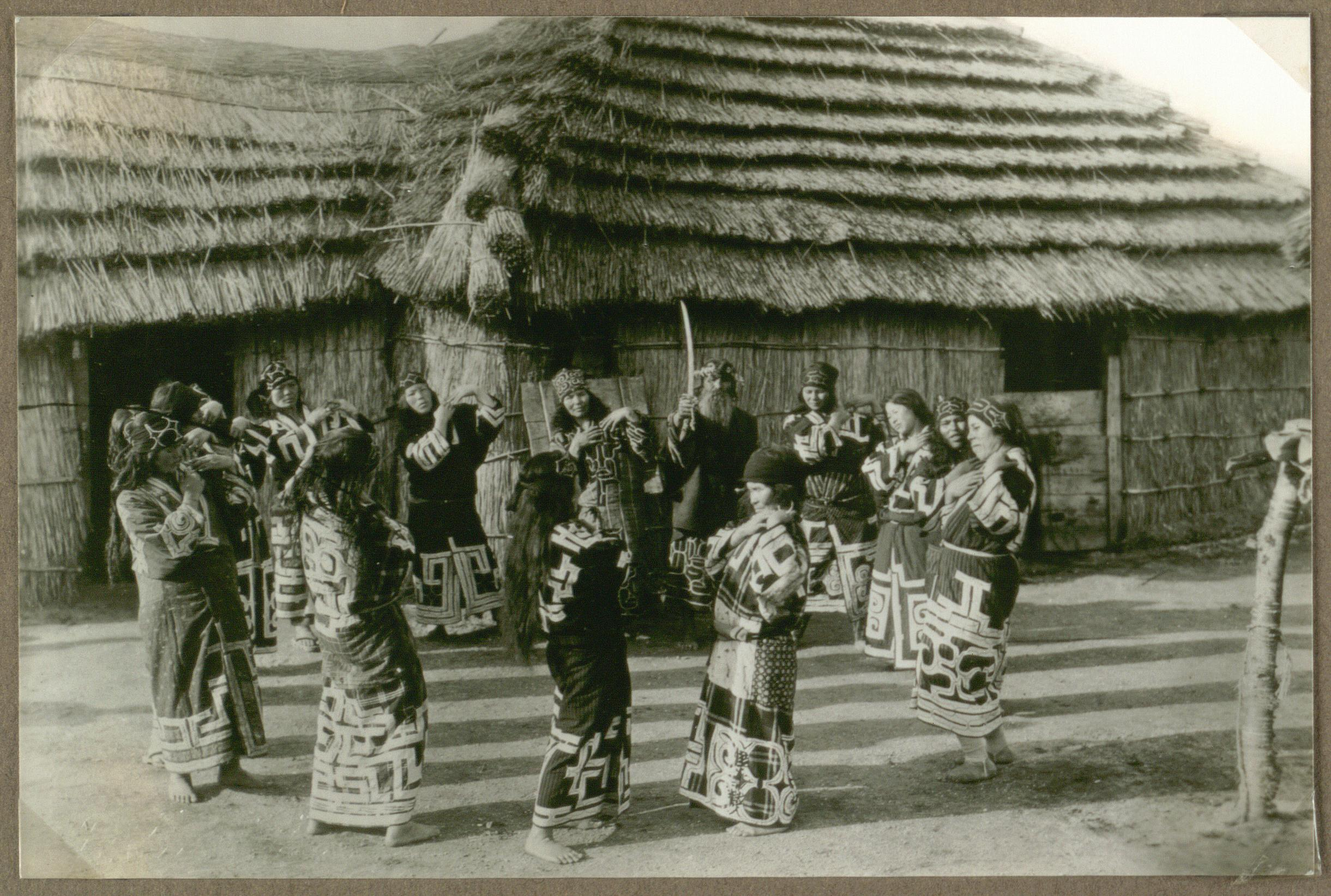

Ainu dance is traditionally performed by the indigenous people of Hokkaido, known as the Ainu people. It "reinforces their connection to the natural and religious world."

It is part of UNESCO's Representative List of the Intangible Cultural Heritage of Humanity. The opening ceremony of the 2020 Olympics in Tokyo was going to include an Ainu dance performance, but it was dropped from the program, prompting coverage about historic discrimination against the Ainu people.

== See also ==
- Ainu music
