= Nares-jux =

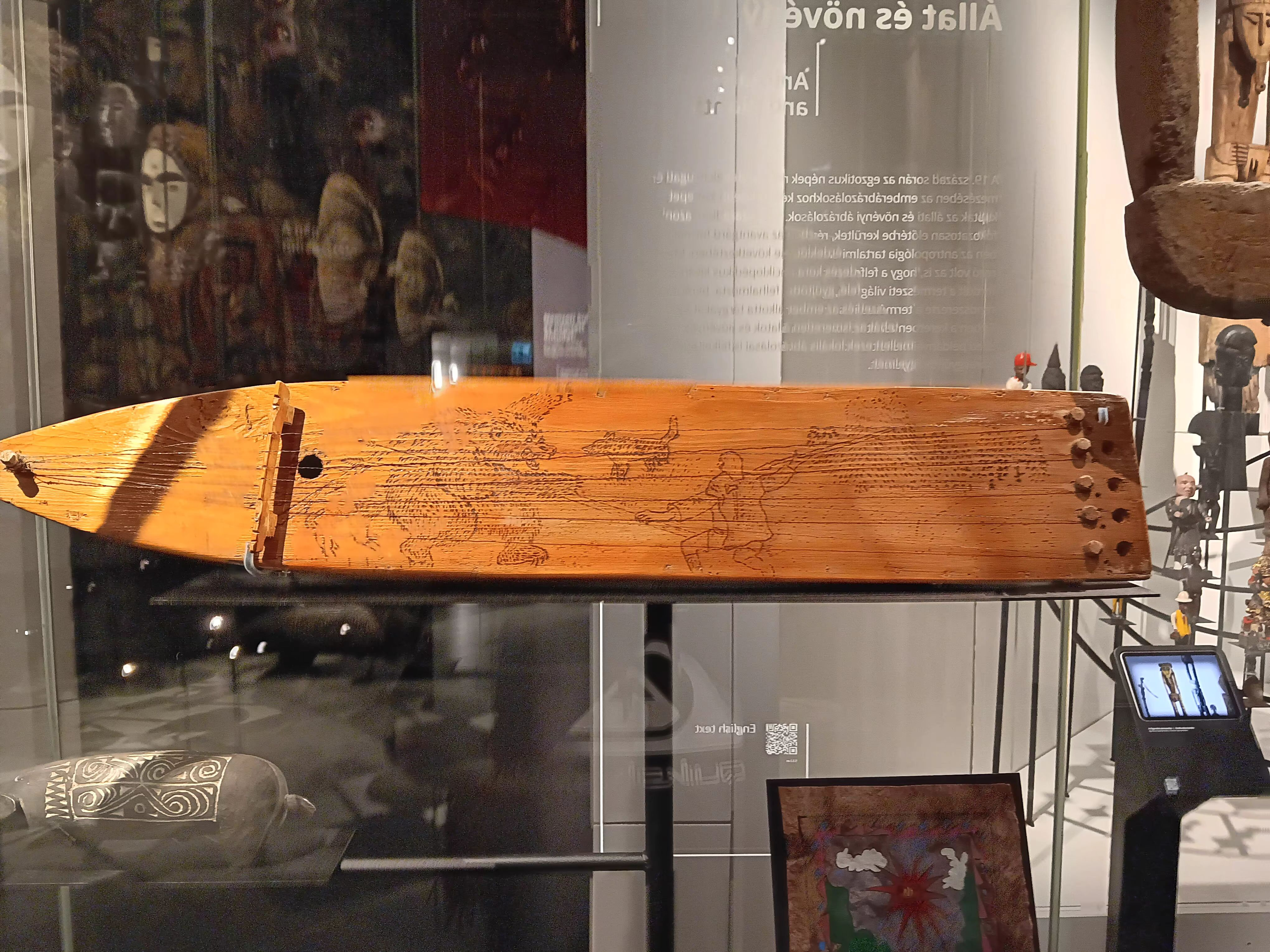
Sagkvyltap at the Museum of Ethnography (Budapest)

The nares-jux (нарс-юх) or Siberian lyre is a musical instrument, a type of box-lyre, played by the peoples of the Khanty-Mansi Autonomous Okrug of Russian Siberia.

== Etymology ==
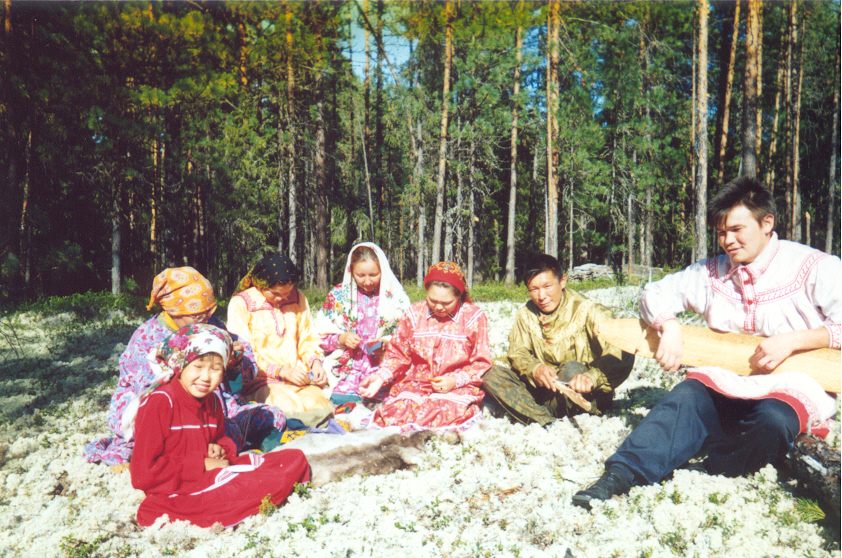
A man playing a sagkvyltap

The Ostyak (Khanty people) term the instrument nares-jux, meaning "musical wood" or "singing tree" in the Khanty language. The same instrument is played by the Mansi people (formerly known as Vogul), and is known as sangkultap (or са̄ӈквылтап (sāŋkwyltap)) in the Mansi language.

Various names and spellings include: naresyuk, nars-yukh, naras-yux, nars-juh, nares-yuk, possibly nanus narsus, panan-juh, or shongoort.

== Construction and playing ==
In the traditional form, the hollow body of the instrument is carved from a single piece of wood (fir or cedar) around 100 cm long. One end is pointed and the other is forked into two arms which carry a crossbar to hold the tuning mechanism. The soundboard is around 0.5 cm in thickness and covers the whole of the body except the forked end. A bridge is fitted, towards the pointed end of the body. A soundpost is fitted inside the instrument, between the back of the body and the soundboard, to provide support at the position of the bridge. There are typically five strings of tendon or gut. Wood or bone tuning levers are used to tension the strings by pulling them around the crossbar. The strings are tuned diatonically, to a major or minor pentachord. These lyres are also distinguished by the placing of pebbles within the resonating body, causing a rattle. Modern examples may have metal strings, an increased number of strings, tuning pegs or pins, and a body which lacks the forked end.

The nares-jux is played with a blocking technique: the player strums the strings with the right hand and uses the fingers of the left hand to damp those strings which are not intended to sound.

== See also ==
- Khutang, an arched-angular lap-harp of the Khanty and Mansi
- Tonkori, a similarly-shaped long five-string zither of the Ainu people of northern Japan
