= Oki (musician) =

Japanese musician (born 1957)

OKI
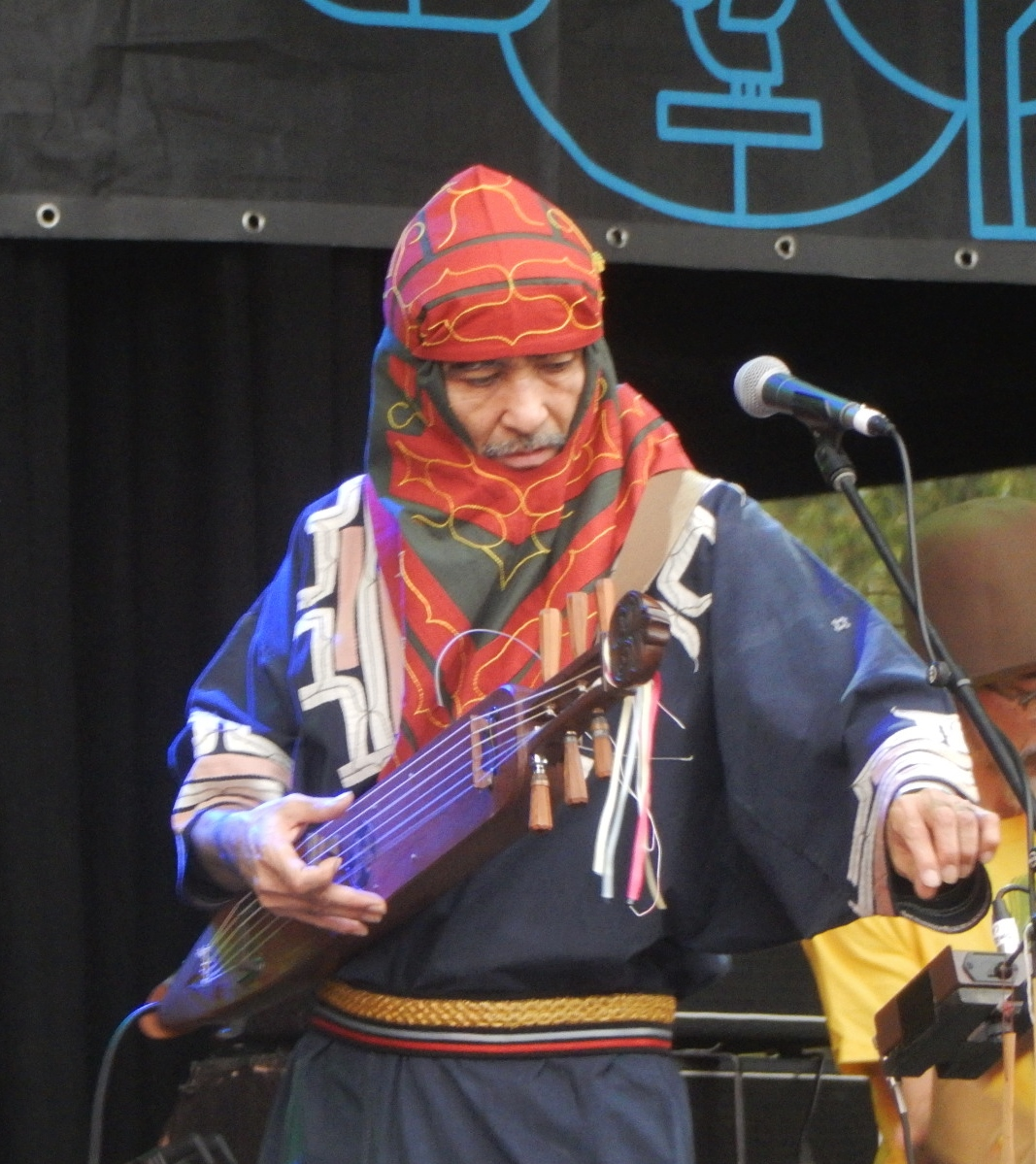
- OKI in 2017

Background information
- Born: Oki Kano (加納 沖, Kanō Oki); 1957 (age 68–69)
- Origin: Kanagawa, Japan
- Genres: Ainu, Dub, Reggae, Rock, Afrobeat
- Instrument: Tonkori
- Years active: 1999–present

Oki Kano (加納 沖, Kanō Oki), known professionally as OKI, is a Japanese musician of mixed Japanese Ainu ancestry.

== Early life and education ==
Oki was born in Hokkaido in 1957, and grew up in Kanagawa Prefecture. He studied industrial arts at the Tokyo National University of Fine Arts and Music. His father, Bikki Sunazawa, was a renowned wood sculptor. Oki grew up with his Japanese mother, and did not know of his Ainu heritage or meet his father until he was an adult.

== Career ==
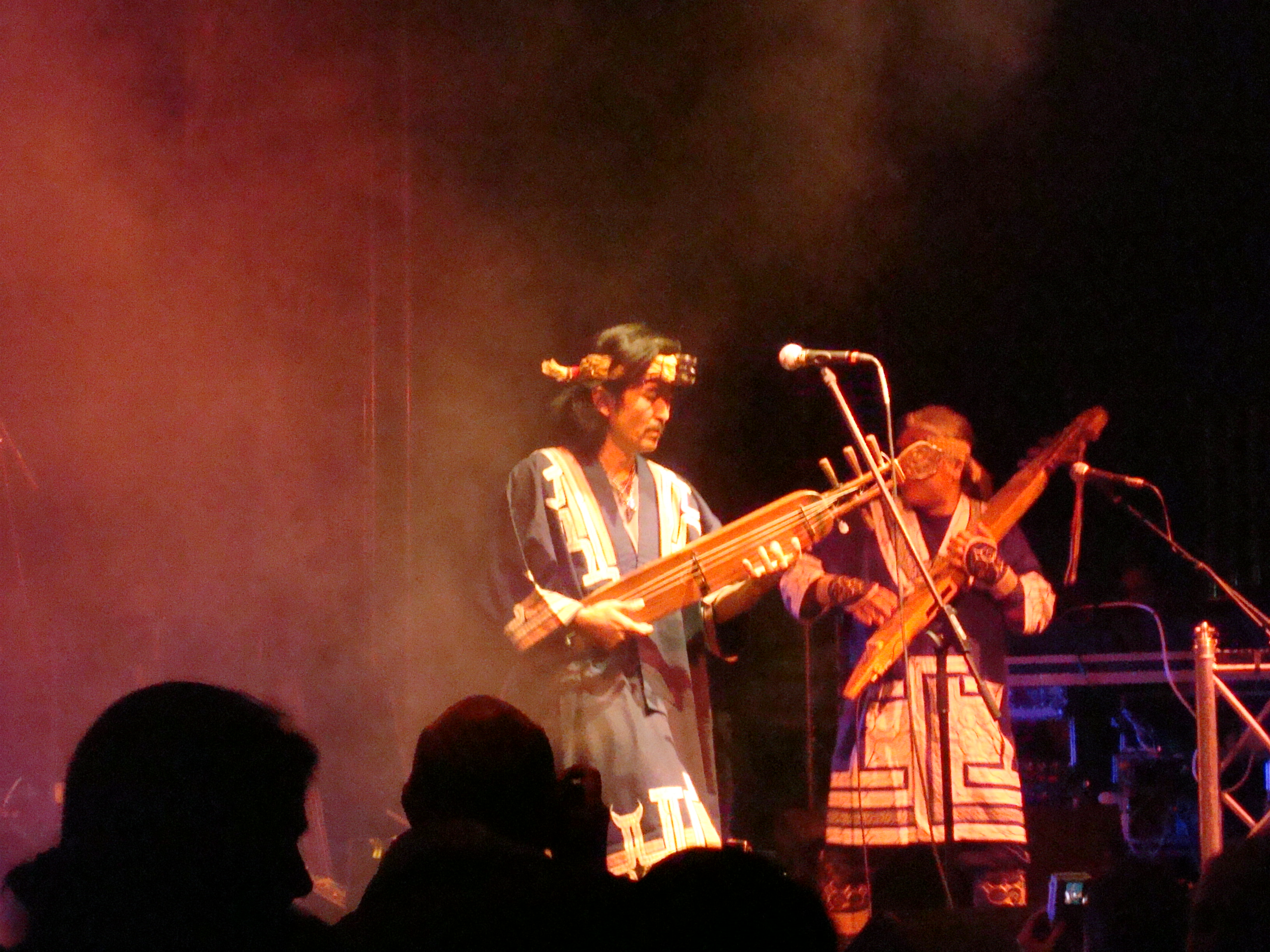
Oki performing with the Oki Dub Ainu Band, 2007

From 1987 to 1992 Oki lived in New York City working as a special effects technician for movies. Back in Japan in 1993, a cousin gave him a tonkori, an Ainu stringed instrument, and he slowly taught himself how to play it. He uses it in his performances and mixes traditional Ainu music with reggae, dub and other styles of world music. He also plays guitar and traditional Ainu percussion instruments.

Oki performs frequently in Japan, and he has also taken part in a number of folk music festivals in other countries. In 2006, he released the album Kíla & Oki with the Irish band, Kíla. His earlier solo albums include collaborations with the female Ainu singing group Marewrew, who sometimes appear in his live show as well. He plays with his own Oki Dub Ainu Band, which plays mostly traditional Ainu songs in an electric style which mixes dub rhythms with tonkori playing. During live concerts, he either plays with the Dub Ainu Band or as a solo acoustic act, singing and playing the tonkori. He also plays tonkori in the collaborative group Amamiaynu.

== Works ==
Albums, singles

- Hankapuy (feat. Umeko Ando) March 20, 1999
- Kamuy Kor Nupurpe May 27, 2001
- No-One'S Land June 2, 2002
- Dub Ainu October 17, 2004
- Tonkori May 12, 2005
- "Tóg É Go Bog É" (Single) February 17, 2006 (Kíla and OKI)
- "Kíla & Oki"(album), 2006 (Kíla and OKI)
- Kuma Shutsubotsu (熊出没), Greatest hits - February 17, 2006
- Dub Ainu Deluxe July 16, 2006
- Oki Dub Ainu Band December 3, 2006
- "Eternal Dub Serenade" May 30, 2007
- Sakhalin Rock July 14, 2010
- Himalayan Dub April 16, 2011
- Tonkori in the Moonlight February 4, 2022

Collaborations

- IHUNKE - Umeko Ando - May 20, 2001
- UPOPO SANKE - Umeko Ando - December 14, 2003
- Kita to Minami (北と南; "North & South") - OKI meets Misako Oshiro - March 14, 2012

Picture book

- Kanna Kamui to Musume (カンナカムイと娘)
  - Story - Ito Oda (小田イト), Illustrations - OKI

Television

- Opening narration for K-tai Investigator 7

== See also ==
- Ainu music
