= Rekuhkara =

Ainu style of singing

Rekuhkara (from Sakhalin Ainu rekuh レクㇷ 'throat'; rekut レクㇳ or レクッ in Hokkaidō Ainu) is a style of singing, similar to Inuit throat singing, that was practised by the Ainu until 1976 when the last practitioner died. The Sakhalin spelling rekuxkara or the Japanese spelling rekukkara (レクッカラ in Katakana) can also be encountered.

The Ainu method involved two women facing each other, with one forming a tube with her hands and chanting into the oral cavity of her partner. The technique is essentially one where the "giver" provides the voice and the "receiver", holding her glottis closed, uses her vocal tract to modulate the sound stream.

Attempts have been made to recreate the sound of this practice.

== See also ==
- Ainu music
- Culture of Japan
- Inuit throat singing
- Throat singing
