= Mukkuri =

Ainu plucked idiophone

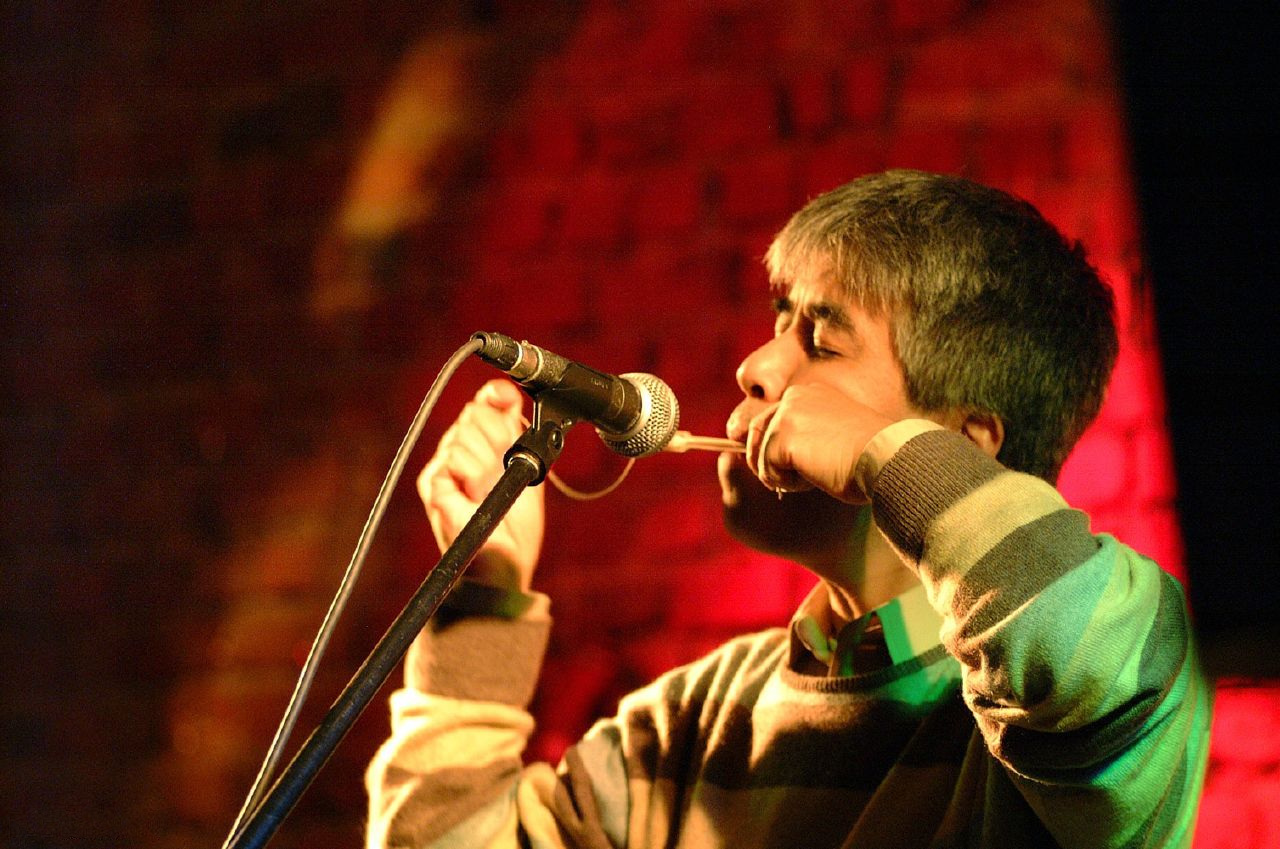
Leo Tadakawa playing the Mukkuri

The mukkuri is a traditional Japanese plucked idiophone indigenous to the Ainu. It is made from bamboo and is 10 cm long and 1.5 cm wide. Sound is made by pulling the string and, similar to a Jew's harp, vibrating the reed as it is placed in the performer's mouth.

== Notable players ==
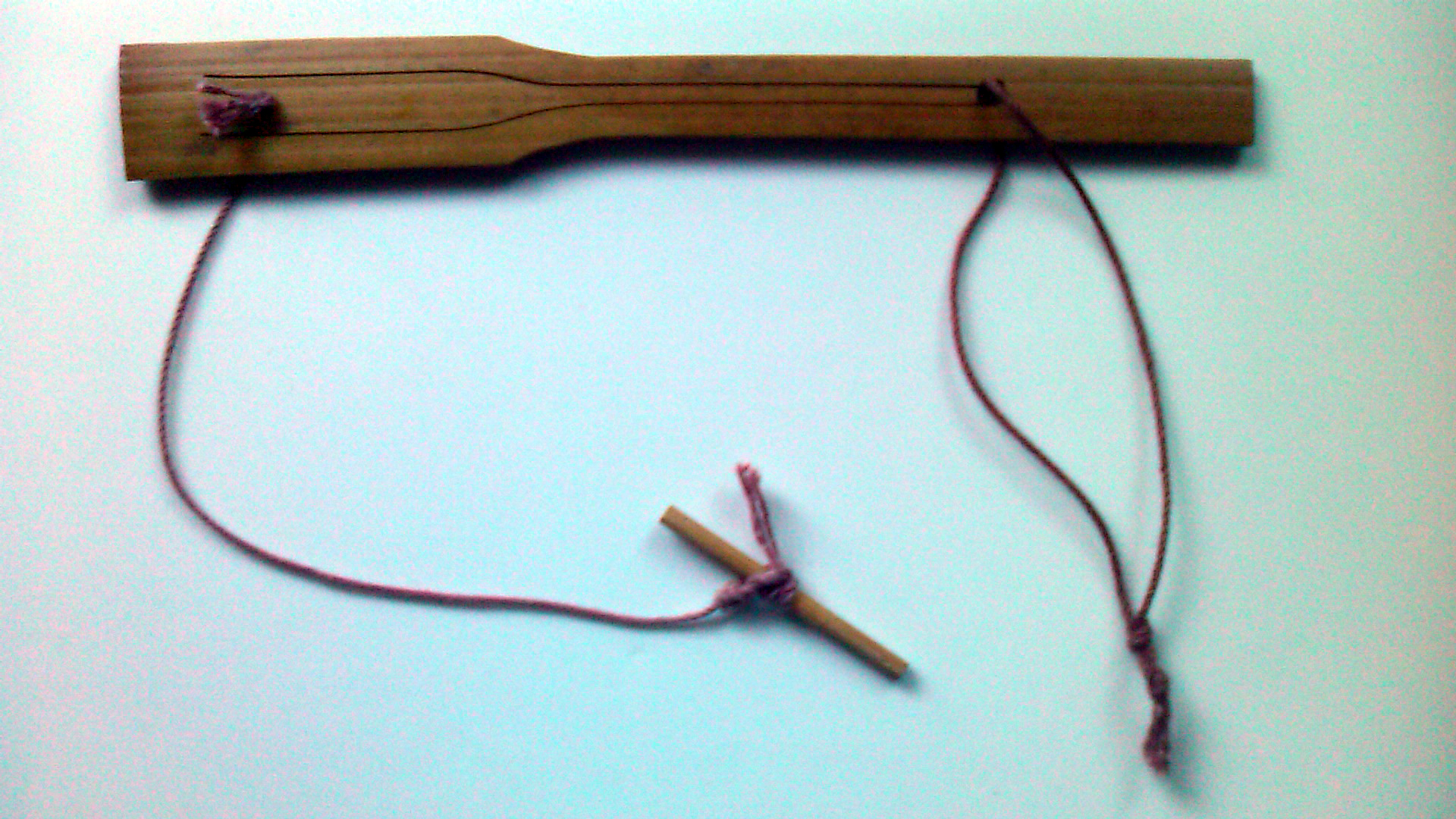
Mukkuri

In 1964 the national broadcast station NHK recorded a film 北方民族の楽器 (Hoppō minzoku no gakki; Musical Instruments of the People of the North). Umeko Andō (November 20, 1932 - July 15, 2004) was a prominent figure who also sang Upopo Ainu songs and recorded them on CDs. A DVD titled けうとぅむ (keutumu) was produced to introduce Ando's life published post mortem in April 2006 by Education Board, Makubetsu, Hokkaido. Shigiko Teshi was another prominent Mukkuri player.

Daisuke Hare (1965-) played with Ando after he apprenticed under her. Hare organized the first mukkuri competition in 2004 after he visited harpists in the Sakha Republic in 2003.

Akira Ifukube, noted for the soundtracks of the Godzilla movies, visited Ainu villages many times during his childhood. In 1997, Ifukube invited Umeko Ando to play for his biographical TV drama 北の交響曲 (Kitano Kōkyōkyoku; "Symphony of the North") produced and aired by Hokkaido Cultural Broadcasting (UHB).

== Audio recordings ==
For many years since the 1960s, audio recordings of Ainu traditional music seldom included Mukkuri sounds. The audio recording of indigenous music of the world in 1973 did not include Ainu music, but planned to publish them as a unique set, which was published with 3 audio CDs and a booklet. Umeko Ando made the most recordings of Ainu music:

- 1994 安東ウメ子・ムックリの世界 (Umeko Ando - the World of Mukkuri), produced by Education Board, Makubetsu-cho. Audio CD.
- 1998 "Homage to the Rivers of the World" by Shigiko Teshi (recorded on June 19, 1998).
- 1999 Hankapuy Audio CD.
- 2001 イフンケ (Ihunke (Lullaby)) produced by OKI, an Ainu musician. Released from Tical Studio. Solo album CD.
- 2002 シリピリカ (Siripirika), Education Board, Makubetsu-cho. Audio CD.
- 2003 ウポポサンケ (Upoposanke), Tical Studio.

A sampling album "Spirits from Ainu" included the song "Inishieno Ibuki" which used Ando's singing voice, and that song was used in a visual DVD commemorating the designation of Shiretoko Cape as a UNESCO World Natural Heritage.

Mukkuri is often accompanied by tonkori, a plucked string instrument.

== Bibliography ==
- Tadakawa, Leo (2005). Kōkinno hibiku sekai [The World Jaw Harp Resonates]. Nihon Kōkin Kyōkai. ISBN 978-4-9902-8470-1. Published with an audio CD and discusses Jaw Harp from around the world. An interview is included with professor emeritus Yoshiko Kojima of National Museum of Japanese Histories, an antholopologist.
