= Ainu folk music =

Musical traditions of the Japanese indigenous people

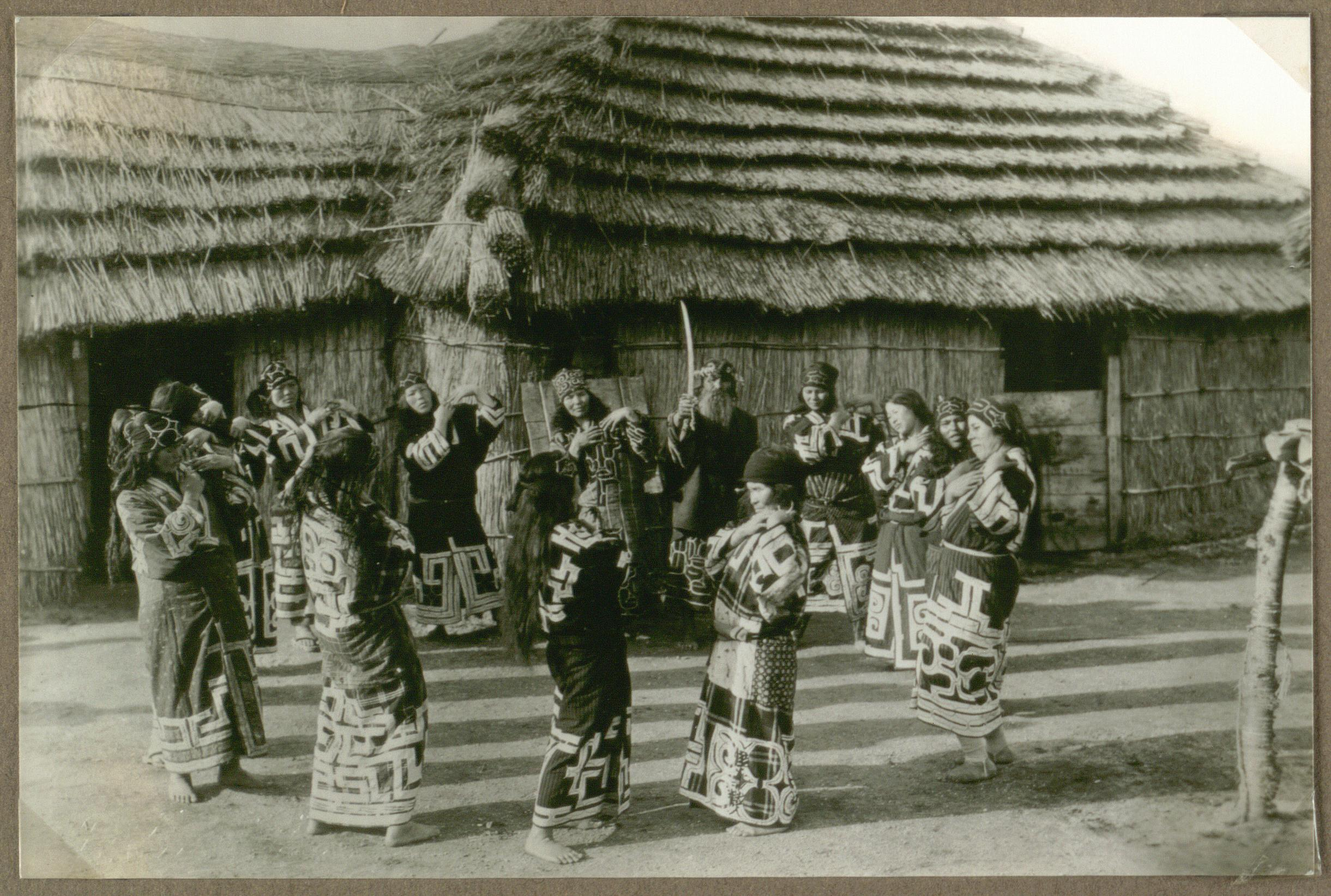
Ainu people partaking in singing and ceremonial round dance

Ainu music is the musical tradition of the Ainu people of northern Japan. Ainu people have no indigenous system of writing, and so have traditionally inherited the folklore and the laws of their culture orally, often through music.

The oral Ainu culture includes various genres, including upopo, lighthearted ballads on daily affairs and rituals often accompanied by traditional Ainu instrumentation, and yukar (mimicry), a form of rhythmic epic poetry often supported by light percussion.

The contents of these ballads were historically an important source of understanding daily life as well as various traditions and habits of the Ainu people, and remain today an important part of the Ainu cultural identity and inheritance, as seen in efforts by performers such as Oki, the most famous contemporary performer of Ainu music.

The most useful English-language overview of Ainu music (with recordings and transcriptions) is by Chiba Nobuhiko.

== Traditional Ainu music genres ==
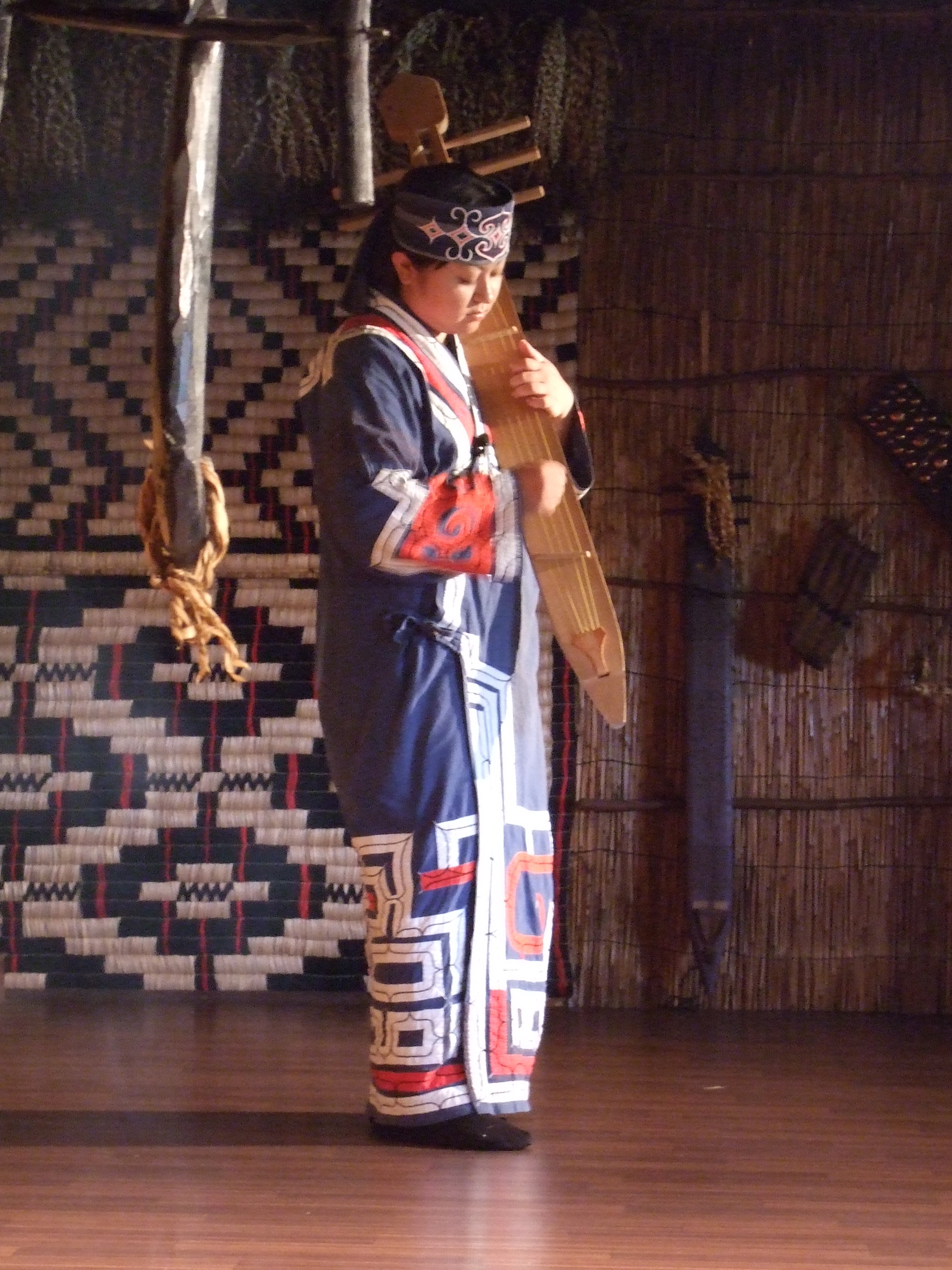
Woman playing traditional Ainu tonkori zither

Ainu music carries spiritual resonance in almost all of its forms, and it has played an important role in both the cultural history and the cultural renaissance of the Ainu people. Almost every type of Ainu song is sacred, and even the musical instruments are said to be imbued with souls. Traditional Ainu music can be divided into two major groups – everyday songs and epic songs. Everyday songs in Ainu tradition were sung in many situations and on an impromptu basis. They were often accompanied by the two most prevalent Ainu musical instruments: the tonkori, a plucked zither, and the mukkuri, a jaw harp played by women.

=== Upopo ===
These everyday songs are short, fairly simple, and center on an activity like a game or work. The act of singing is itself used as a game in some instances, such as Rekuhkara (Ainu throat-singing) competitions between women. Work songs are rhythmic, with lyrics and melodies based on the work with which they are sung. However, even such everyday songs have sacred rather than mundane meanings. "Chants like the kar upopo (sake-making song) and the iyuta upopo (the pounding song)…are not labor songs; rather, they are magic-oriented, for they are sung to ward off evil spirits". Short, everyday songs are also a way of praying. These prayer songs are (or were) performed regularly before meals, after a fishing trip, to ask for luck in hunting, and in many other contexts. Unfortunately, material about everyday songs is very difficult to obtain. Many have never been recorded.

=== Yukar ===
Ainu epic songs, yukar, are performed as long monologues. The singer performs the song entirely from memory, and, traditionally, in a "non-formal" setting such as a friend's house or before the hearth at a gathering. While somewhat casual, these epics are still more formal than the short prayer songs mentioned earlier. Both men and women recite Ainu epics, though the vocal qualities of women are considered preferable to those of men. The epic songs are fairly rhythmic melodic chants. The voice of the singer usually fluctuates within words, and phrases and sentences are distinguished by the melody. Singers strive for their audience to understand every word. The epic is unaccompanied by musical instruments, though at times both the singer and the listener might tap repni, or simple blocks of wood, against the hearth or the floor to help keep time and punctuate the epic. Certain paintings also show these epics being performed lying down, with the singer beating time on his or her abdomen with the hands, but this practice has faded into obscurity.

Epics themselves take several different forms. Following Philippi's model and dividing them in two different ways, they can be distinguished by both subject and style. Philippi divides epic subjects into two groups: mythic narratives and heroic narratives. Mythic narratives are those epics featuring origin stories and stories of deities, while heroic narratives are those narratives featuring the cultural heroes of the Ainu. Mythic narratives can be told either from the point of view of a human observer or from the point of view of the divine participant. One of the most distinctive aspects of Ainu epics is this first person god point of view. Heroic narratives feature one of several major culture heroes, or recurring protagonists of mythical origins, such as Kotan-Kor-Kamui, or the Owl God. Though these culture heroes are often presented as gods, they are more human than they seem. They are analogous to the Navajo and Apache Coyote; while he is a god, he is representative of human interests and foibles. Stylistically, epics can be divided into two more categories. Some epics are novelistic and feature a set chain of events involving gods and humans, while others, which Philippi refers to as parodies, feature abnormal situations – unexplained phenomena and dreams, presented without a clear chronological narrative. These "parody" epics are very rare.

Epics, as well as a few of the more everyday songs, are regularly featured in Ainu ceremonies. For example, the most famous of Ainu cultural events, the "bear-sending ceremony," is accompanied by a whole host of songs, not the least of which is the "Song of a Bear," a mythic epic. This epic relates the story of the bear god, who, in saving his young son, is killed by human hunters. The song both presents the situation from the god's point of view – he is confused when he is killed, and doesn't recognize his own dead body for what it is – and prescribes the methods for the bear-sending ceremony. The premise for the bear-sending is that the bear god is trapped in his mortal body, and by killing the bear in a ritualized, respectful manner, humans are doing the god a favor and sending him home. The song describes the inau, or carved sticks that are used as holy objects by the Ainu, as well as the prayers and ceremonies that are used to send the bear home. In this way, the ceremony and the epic are somewhat inseparable. The activities of the ceremony are outlined by the epic, and the epic accompanies the ceremony to reinforce it. Though the epic can be performed outside of the ceremony, it cannot exist without the ceremony as context, and the ceremony cannot be performed without the epic. These epics, as well as the everyday songs, represent the cultural heritage of the Ainu and allow us to understand customs and their mythic significance, but they also act as indicators of the relative well-being of the Ainu culture.

=== Rekuhkara ===
Rekukhara, also known as rekutkar (composed from the Ainu words for throat, rekut, and produce kar), was a vocal game popular amongst Sakhalin Ainu, and used throat singing techniques comparable to katajjaq, the Inuit singing style. A game was typically played by two to ten people at a time, always in pairs.

At the start of each game, players take opposite places and form with their hands a closed tube between each other's mouths. One of the players starts by making a certain rhythmical motive which then resonates in the other player's mouth. This player must then uphold this motive until the other player decides to change motive. Whoever can uphold these rules without losing breath or laughing wins.

According to an interview with the daughter of the last practitioner of this style (who died in 1973), the rekukhara was often done during the iomante ritual, the slaughter of a brown bear, as the produced sounds from this game would symbolically refer to the cries of the bear.

=== Yaisama ===
Yaisama is a form of singing game used as an expression of certain emotions (such as expressing love) or as means of self introduction in a group. As lyrics and melody are improvised on the spot, this genre can be compared to contemporary freestyle rap.

=== Lullabies ===
The name of these Ainu lullabies differ by location: the terms Iyon'nokka or Iyonruika were commonly used in the Hidaka region, while Ihunke was the term used by Asahikawa and Tokachi Ainu.

One of the characteristics of these lullabies, is the mother's production of meaningless sounds such as "Ohho Lulu Rurururu" on the rhythm of lulling baby's cradle, typically done by rolling the tip of the tongue.

== Instruments ==
The two most prevalent Ainu musical instruments are the tonkori and the mukkuri. Through the effort of Ainu cultural organizations as well as prominent musicians, both have enjoyed a certain revival. Evidence shows the existence of several other instruments attributed to the Ainu, but these are no longer in active use.

As a result of the geographical dispersion of the Ainu people over various neighboring islands, some of these native instruments strongly differ in usage and construction.

=== Mukkuri ===
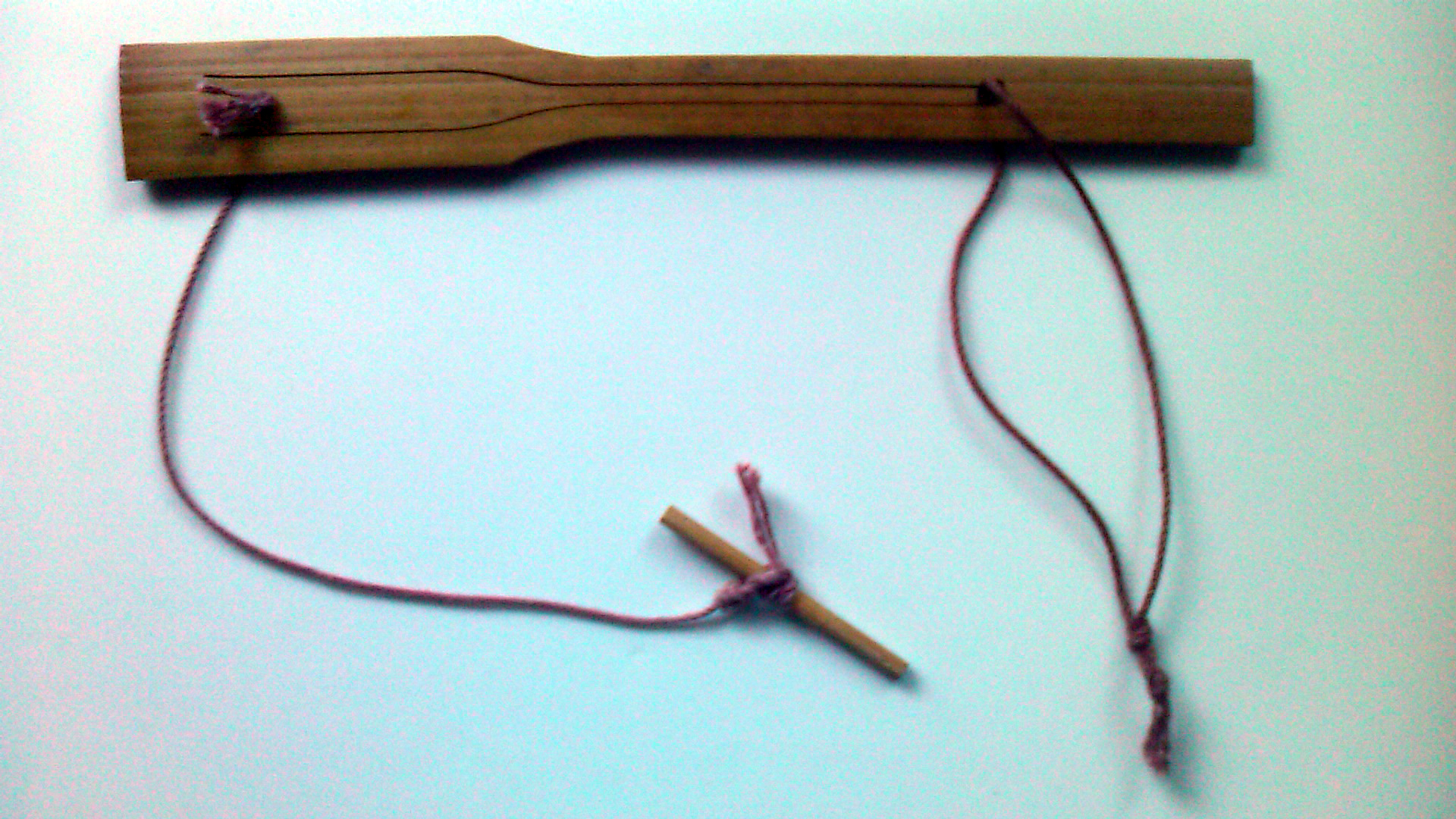
Mukkuri.

The Mukkuri is an idiophone made out of bamboo, similar in construction to the Jew's harp. Sound is produced by manipulating a string connected to the bamboo reed, and while the instrument is unpitched, tone manipulation can be accomplished by altering the size of one's mouth, which serves as a resonance box during playing.

Historically this instrument did not retain a large importance in Ainu communities and was commonly seen as a children's toy rather than a tool for supporting songs or rituals. The mukkuri's inexpensive production however has made it a popular tourist souvenir in Hokkaido.

=== Tonkori ===
The tonkori, an onomatopoeic description of the sound the instrument produces, is a plucked string instrument and generally has five strings made out of gut. Unfretted and played open, the tonkori is limited in tones by the number of strings. The tonkori is played by both men and women and commonly serves as musical accompaniment to yukar or dances and rituals, although solo-performances have been noted as well.

=== Kakko ===
The kakko is a percussion instrument similar to the tambourine, used for accompanying yukar or shamanistic rituals. It is made by stretching animal skin over a cylindrical ring commonly made out of willow or larch, and its drumbeater is done by wrapping dogskin over a branch.

=== Cirektekuttar ===
The cirektekuttar (referred to in Sakhalin as henyudo, ionka or pehkutu), was a cylindrical wind instrument made out of the root of a reed indigenous to northern Japan, and is thought to have been similar in style and usage as the didgeridoo developed by Indigenous Australians.

=== Pararayki ===
After cultural exchange with the Russians, Ainu living on the Kurille islands built this instrument in the image of the Russian balalaika, pronounced in Ainu as pararayki.

=== Ainu fiddle ===
Missionary-anthropologist John Batchelor describes the existence of several Ainu-created fiddles no longer in use.

== Identity and marginalization ==
Ainu music has been important throughout the years in both reflecting and establishing the Ainu cultural identity. Ainu music, historically, has represented the state of Ainu society. The folkloric epics of the Ainu often refer directly to the state of the Ainu as a group. For example, when the Ainu were first conquered, in the period of decline after the 16th century, the culture heroes featured in the heroic types of epics were said to have "departed in indignation,". In addition to this kind of direct representation of Ainu cultural identity, the variable increase and decline of Ainu music is also indicative of Ainu culture. In the peak Ainu period, the most complex and fantastic epics were created, stretching out to tens of thousands of verses and building on new and complex ideas. In the most desperate period for the Ainu, however, in late 19th and early 20th centuries, when the population declined to only 15,000 or so, Ainu music was very scarce; even the famous bear-sending ceremony was described as a "once-in-a-lifetime" experience in 1948.

=== Decline ===
The pressure on Ainu music throughout their history as a people under the rule of a dominant majority has come largely from the Japanese government. The Japanese government deliberately banned Ainu language, music, and dance (including the bear ceremony) in 1799 in an attempt to homogenize the Ainu with the larger Japanese population. In addition to this, through pressure and in governmental institutions such as schools, "on every possible occasion the Bakufu persuaded the natives to follow the Japanese way,". This attitude, that the Ainu should do as much as possible to become Japanese, existed in the government well into the 20th century. A railway tourism manual published in 1941 reflects not only this attitude, but also the idea that the Ainu were happy to have their culture suppressed in this way. "They have a special aversion to distinctive treatment, and have Japanized themselves in every respect. They have abandoned their native customs and manners, forgotten the Ainu tongue and effected a complete change in their daily life." It continues, "They requested of the Government a census whereby they might become recognized Japanese subjects. This the Government instituted and the Ainu were accepted as common people. Consequently, they are now so Japanesque that their characteristics as an Ainu race will vanish before long,". While these excerpts are indicative of the attitude of the government that the Ainu should conform to the rest of Japanese society, the pamphlet's very existence counters the idea that they fit in. The pamphlet goes on to detail the very differences that make the Ainu worth writing a tourism pamphlet on, describing their customs and ceremonies and even pointing out their racial differences.

This kind of contradiction is actually characteristic of the way the Japanese government has treated the Ainu, especially in the early 20th century. Besides publications such as the aforementioned pamphlet, the government also created cultural shows featuring Ainu song and dance that acted as tourist attractions (this occurred, of course, after the ban on Ainu music had been lifted). Ainu singers and dancers could often only find an avenue for their talents, and in some cases, find any job at all, in these cultural shows. The shows featured sacred, ceremonial songs, especially those of the famous bear-sending. The songs would be repeated three or four times a day, for dozens of tourists. Kayano Shigeru, who some have called "Ainu personified", a prominent Ainu public figure, recalls the shows he participated in with shame. "It is beyond words for me to explain to others how miserable it made us feel to sing and dance – albeit for money – in front of curious tourists from throughout Japan when we weren't even happy or excited." The government was, in effect, encouraging certain aspects of Ainu culture while concurrently suppressing it as a whole. Ceremonial songs and dances became both a viable means of making a living and a shameful badge of dishonor.

=== Revival ===
In recent years, Ainu music has begun to take part in an intense Ainu cultural revival. The Ainu began reclaiming their identity as a cultural group in the 1960s and 1970s, meeting with one another, creating organized groups, and even developing an Ainu flag. While most of this reclamation occurred by way of peaceful meetings and beneficial organizations such as Kayano Shigeru's work for a national Ainu museum, some groups, like Ainu Liberation, used terrorist tactics such as the bombing of 23 October 1972, to attract attention to their cause. As a whole, however, the movement for Ainu cultural identity has been exacted through cultural media such as art, storytelling, and music, and political tactics like voting blocs and nonviolent protests. In the 1970s and 1980s, festival and ceremonial revivals began to occur, acting as a catalyst for cultural unity. When Ainu ceremonies were performed regularly for the first time in years, it allowed Ainu to come together, to identify and get to know one another through the avenue of culture, and to bond through that avenue as well. In addition to the creation of community in this way, and because Ainu song is so firmly rooted in history, Ainu were able to reclaim their folkloric history through these ceremonies.

The revival of Ainu culture, and especially music, has meant more than just the development of a cohesive group of Ainu people, however. It has, not surprisingly, also resulted in the rise of an Ainu-music pop star on the Japanese stage. Oki Kano, the most prominent player of Ainu-inspired pop music in Japan, plays songs that are based on Ainu ceremonial songs. They use indigenous Ainu instruments, Ainu language, and Ainu subject matter, but also include Western influences such as guitar and bass, and sound similar to British ska music. Oki Kano is fairly well known in Japan, and represents the idea of Ainu music to many Japanese people, even though his music is very Westernized.

== List of Ainu musicians and composers ==
- Akira Ifukube was very interested in Ainu music, and often utilized it in his film scores such as the famous Farou Island chant in King Kong vs. Godzilla.
- Oki Kano, a tonkori performer and singer, known for his fusion group, Oki Dub Ainu Band.
- Marewrew
- IMERUAT (meaning "lightning" in the Ainu language) is a music group formed in 2011 by composer and pianist Masashi Hamauzu (浜渦正志) and vocalist Mina (Mina Sakai, born in Obihiro, Hokkaido, Japan) of Ainu ancestry. Mina sings in Ainu, Japanese and English.
- Hare Daisuke is a prominent mukkuri performer who has played and recorded with Saga Haruhiko and the late Umeko Ando.
- Umeko Ando was a famous Ainu singer and Mukkuri performer and recording artist.
