= Tonkori =

Ainu musical instrument

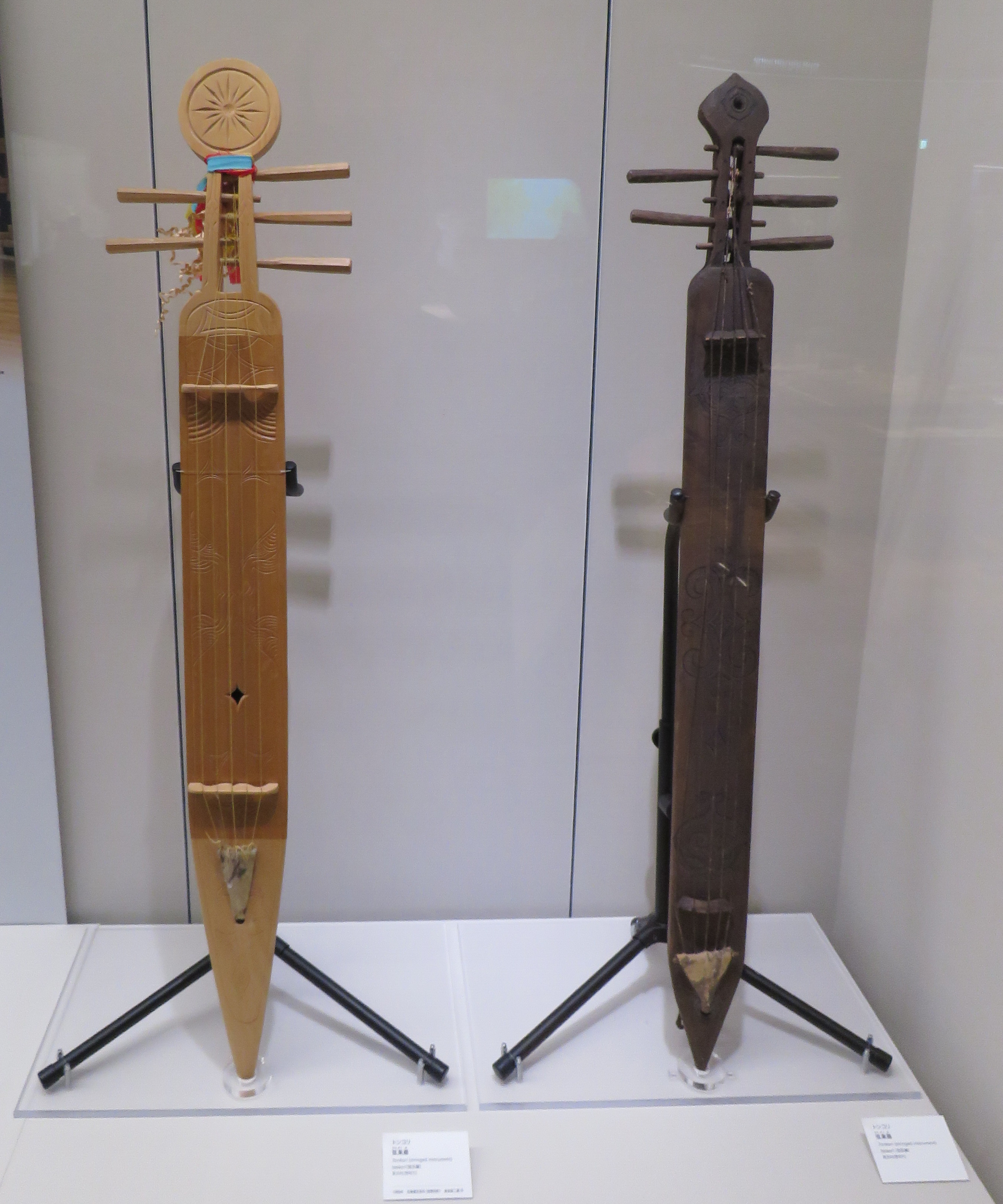
- Tonkori on display at the National Ainu Museum

Musicians
- Oki Kano

The tonkori (トンコリ) is a plucked string instrument played by the Ainu people of Hokkaidō, northern Japan and Sakhalin. It generally has five strings, which are not stopped or fretted but simply played open. The instrument is believed to have been developed in Sakhalin. By the 1970s the instrument was practically extinct, but it has been experiencing a revival along with the increased interest in Ainu heritage.

== Construction ==
The instrument is typically constructed of a single piece of Jezo spruce approximately a metre long. Its shape is traditionally said to resemble a woman's body, and the corresponding words are used for its parts. A pebble is placed within the body-cavity of the instrument, granting it a "soul". The instrument tends to measure approximately 120 cm (47 in) long, 10 cm (3.9 in) wide, and 5 cm (2.0 in) thick.

The tonkori's strings are made of gut, deer tendon, or vegetable fiber. Though five-string tonkori are the most frequently mentioned kind, they can have as few as two, or as many as six strings. The strings are not tuned in order of pitch, but instead use a reentrant tuning alternating between higher and lower strings, rising and falling by fifths in a pentatonic scale, often A–D'–G'–C'–F'. A similar style of reentrant tuning a was used by the ancient Japanese version of the koto, the wagon.

== Performance ==
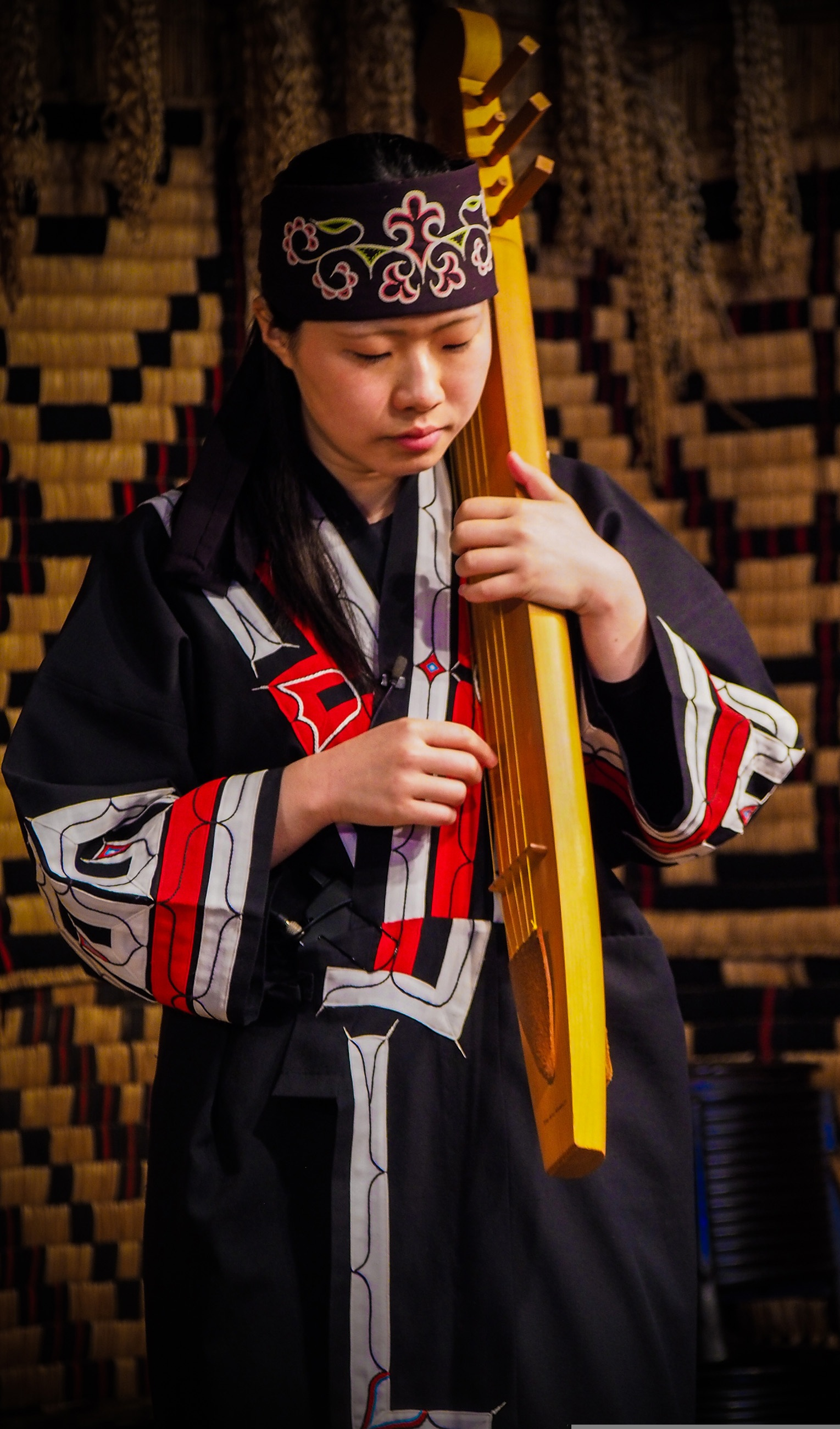

The tonkori is played angled across the chest with the strings outward, while both hands pluck the open strings from opposite sides. The instrument was typically used to accompany song and dance, or otherwise played solo. The tonkori was traditionally played by both men and women.

One description of traditional tonkori technique noted that a player would strum across all the strings, and then pluck a single string with his opposite hand. Another description notes that "the thumbs pluck in an outward direction only."

== Revival ==
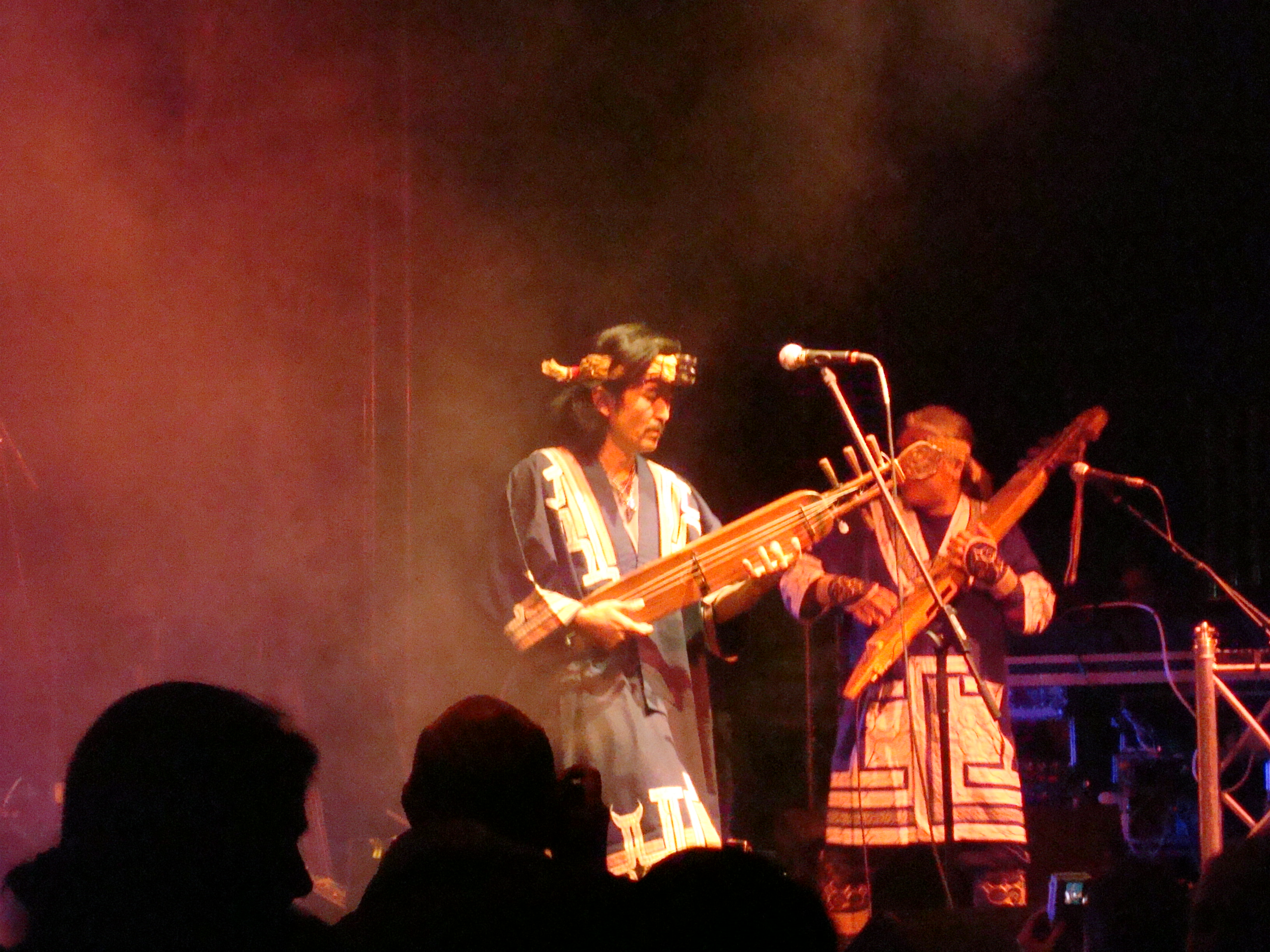
The Oki Ainu Dub Band in 2007

The most prominent modern tonkori performer is Oki Kano, who often uses the instrument in contemporary and cross-cultural performances and recordings.

The researcher Nobuhiko Chiba has been prominent among those researching and analysing the instrument and its music.

== Etymology ==
The term tonkori is an onomatopoeic description of the sound of the instrument. The tonkori was also referred to as the ka ("string"). The late-1800s explorer A. H. Savage Landor documented the tonkori, stating that it was referred to only as mukko ("musical instrument").

Linguist Emiko Ohnuki-Tierney noted that /tonkori/ was sometimes pronounced [donkori], using a voiced stop for the initial sound. One 1962 French publication notes the usage of the spelling donkori in an earlier work, while the 1969 Asian Review appears to use tonguri and tongari as alternate spellings.

== Players ==
- Oki Kano
- K.D earth (in Japanese)
- Sanpe (Nobuhiko Chiba)
- ToyToy (Motoi Ogawa)
- Kumiko Sukegawa

== See also ==
- Ainu music
- Ainu fiddle
- Nares-jux, a similar instrument of Siberia
