= Khutang =

Musical instrument

The Khutang (literally translated to "swan", also called Ostyak harp, Kiotang, Sotang, Shotang) is a type of harp played by the Khanty and Mansi people of Siberia. The Khutang and the Nares-jux lyre are the only two indigenous string instruments of Northern Siberia. The Khutang is bow-shaped and often surmounted by a carven animal head, which is often a swan. It is generally described as having between nine and thirteen strings.

The Mansi also referred to the instrument as Taryghsyp Yiv (meaning "wooden crane-neck").

A similar swan-shaped and two-stringed harp is played by the Narym Selkup people of Siberia, which may have been based on the Ostyak Harp.
