= Yamato-damashii =

Cultural concept for shared values of the Japanese people

Yamato-damashii (大和魂; "Yamato/Japanese spirit") or Yamato-gokoro (大和心; "Japanese heart/mind") is a term in the Japanese language for the cultural values and characteristics of the Japanese people. The phrase was coined in the Heian period to describe the indigenous Japanese 'spirit' or cultural values as opposed to cultural values of foreign nations such as those identified through contact with Tang dynasty China. Later, a qualitative contrast between Japanese and Chinese spirit was elicited from the term. Edo period writers and samurai used it to augment and support the Bushido concept of honor and valor. English translations of Yamato-damashii include the "Japanese spirit", "Japanese soul", "Yamato spirit", and "The Soul of Old Japan". Lafcadio Hearn mentions the latter in connection with Shinto.

For this national type of moral character was invented the name Yamato-damashi (or Yamato-gokoro), — the Soul of Yamato (or Heart of Yamato), — the appellation of the old province of Yamato, seat of the early emperors, being figuratively used for the entire country. We might correctly, though less literally, interpret the expression Yamato-damashi as "The Soul of Old Japan". (1904:177)

== Etymology ==
Originally Yamato-damashii did not bear the bellicose weight or ideological timbre that it later assumed in pre-war modern Japan. It first occurs in the Otome (乙女) section of The Tale of Genji (Chapter 21), as a native virtue that flourishes best, not as a contrast to foreign civilization but, rather precisely, when it is grounded on a solid basis in Chinese learning. Thus we read:

No, the safe thing is to give him a good, solid fund of knowledge. It is when there is a fund of Chinese learning (zae 才) that the Japanese spirit (yamato-damashii 大和魂) is respected in the world. (Murasaki Shikibu, The Tale of Genji tr. Edward Seidensticker, 1976, 1:362)

Each man, according to Motoori Norinaga (who wrote a Commentary of The Tale of Genji ), has at his birth a "true heart" a "magokoro" (the term magokokoro is itself almost an onomatopoeia since kokoro, the heart, expresses these "beats of the heart") whose ancient Japanese literature is the most faithful expression. This sentiment expresses the Yamato gokoro (大和心, "Japanese heart") as opposed to the Kara gokoro ("superficial level of consciousness cluttered with masculine things, intellectually astute but full of pretension").

== Lexicology ==
Yamato-damashii "Japan, Japanese" compounds Yamato (大和, "great harmony") with damashii, which is the voiced rendaku pronunciation of tamashii (魂 "spirit; soul"). Both these kanji (Chinese characters used in Japan) readings Yamato (大和) and damashii (魂) are native Japanese kun'yomi, while the Wakon (和魂 "Japanese spirit") reading is Sinitic on'yomi borrowed from Chinese Héhún (和魂).

Yamato is historically the second of three common Japanese endonyms (or autonyms) for 'Japan; Japanese'.

- Wa (倭 or 和) is Japan's oldest endonym and derives from the Han dynasty Chinese exonym Wō 倭 "Japan, Japanese". This character 倭, which graphically combines the 亻 "human, person" radical and a wěi 委 "bend" phonetic, was usually pronounced wēi in Classical Chinese compounds like wēichí 倭遲 "winding, circuitous", but scholars have interpreted Wō 倭 "Japanese" as connoting either "submissive; docile" or "short; dwarf". In the 8th century, Japanese scribes replaced the pejorative Chinese character 倭 for Wa "Japan" with Wa 和 "harmony; peace".
- Yamato (大和, "great harmony") is the oldest native name for "Japan". Daiwa and Taiwa (borrowed from Chinese dàhé 大和) are on'yomi readings. This name Yamato (大和) originally referred to "Yamato Province", around present-day Nara Prefecture, where Emperor Jimmu legendarily founded Japan. Common words with this prefix include Yamato-jidai (大和時代 "Yamato period", 250-710 CE), Yamato-minzoku (大和民族 "Yamato people; Japanese race"), and Yamato-e (大和絵 "traditional Japanese-style paintings").

In current Japanese usage, Wa 倭 is an archaic variant Chinese character for Wa 和, Yamato is a literary and historical term, and Nihon is the usual name for "Japan; Japanese".

Tamashii or tama (魂 "soul; spirit; ghost" or 霊 "spirit; soul") is Japanese kun'yomi, while kon or gon is Chinese on'yomi (from hún 魂). The Shinto-influenced semantics of Japanese tama/tamashii exceed customary English concepts of "spirit", "soul", or "ghost", besides the human soul, it also includes diverse spiritual forces found in nature. Roy Andrew Miller suggests that German Geist or French élan are better translations than English spirit or soul:

But finally we must conclude that nothing in any commonly used European language, including English, really does justice to Japanese tama. The spirit, soul, Geist, or élan to which the Japanese term has reference, whether it is the tama of Yamato-damashii or the tama of kotodama, is a vital and active entity that plays no part in any usual Western-language imagery or expression. We have no such word, and we make use of no imagery capitalizing upon the concepts that it employs; but the Japanese have, and they do. (1982:131)

Kotodama (言霊, "word spirit", approximately "magic word") illustrate this traditional Japanese belief about tama(shii) energies. Kenkyūsha's New Japanese-English Dictionary (5th ed., 2003) gives kotodama translation equivalents and a revealing usage example: "ことだま【言霊】, the soul [spirit] of language; the miraculous power of language [a phrase, a spell]. ⇨ 言霊の幸(さきわ)う国 Japan, "the land where the mysterious workings of language bring bliss"."

Yamato nadeshiko (大和撫子, "Japanese fringed pink") is a floral metaphor for "the idealized traditional Japanese woman". During World War II, ultra-nationalists popularized Yamato-nadeshiko as the female manifestation of Yamato-damashii.

== Later history ==
The record of Yamato-damashii dates back one millennium to the Heian period (794–1185) of Japanese history. Chinese culture and Chinese language were highly influential during the previous short Nara period.

Yamato-gokoro (大和心 "Japanese heart; Japanese mind" is the closest synonym of Yamato-damashii. The Heian poet Akazome Emon first used Yamato-gokoro in her Goshūi Wakashū (後拾遺和歌集 "Later Collection of Waka Gleanings," 1086).

Since Wa 和 commonly abbreviates Yamato 大和 "Japan; Japanese", 和魂 (also read Wakon) is a contraction of Yamato-damashii. The Konjaku Monogatarishū (circa 1120) first uses it describing a burglar who murdered a nattering scholar of Chinese classical law. "Although Kiyohara no Yoshizumi (清原善澄) had admirable learning, he is said to have died in this childish way because he did not have the slightest knowledge of the Japanese spirit" (tr. Carr 1994:283).

For centuries after its use by Heian authors Yamato-damashii was rarely recorded until the late Edo period (1600–1868). One Kamakura-period exception is the Gukanshō history (ca. 1220), which uses Yamato-damashii (和魂) in praising the character of child Emperor Toba (r. 1107–1123).

Still, he had the personality of (his uncle) Fujiwara no Kinzane (藤原公実) characterized by Chinese learning and followed in the footsteps of (his ancestor) Sugawara no Michizane, but Toba had even more Japanese spirit than either of them. (adapted from Carr 1994:283)

Another notable exception comes from the mid-Edo period: in 1733, the Suika Shinto scholar Matsuoka Yūen (1701–1783) titled a treatise Shintō gakusoku yamato damashii, in which he criticized the teachings of his own instructor Tamaki Masahide as excessively shamanistic and a departure from the original intentions of Suika Shinto's founder, Yamazaki Ansai, using the term explicitly in opposition to karazae (Chinese learning and scholarship).

Three new "Japanese spirit" phrases originated around the 1867 Meiji Restoration. First, the modernization Nihon-damashii (日本魂) was fashioned by Kyokutei Bakin, a famous samurai author of Gesaku. His Chinsetsu Yumiharizuki ("The Crescent Moon", 1811) quotes Minamoto no Tametomo discussing seppuku rituals: "I admit that a person who does not care about dying when on the verge of death may superficially have the Japanese spirit, but I think this is a misunderstanding from not having learned about it." (tr. Carr 1994:284). Second, Wakon-kansai (和魂漢才 "Japanese spirit and Chinese scholarship") occurs in the Kanke ikai (菅家遺戒 "Sugawara's dying instructions"). Third, Wakon-yōsai (和魂洋才 "Japanese spirit and Western techniques") was created by Yoshikawa Tadayasu (吉川忠安) in his Kaika sakuron (開化策論, "Questions and Themes on Progress", 1867).

Following the Japanese victories in the First Sino-Japanese War and Russo-Japanese War, nationalists made Wakon-yōsai into a catchphrase for modernization and militarization, and developed Yamato-damashii into what Miller (1982:13) calls "the official rallying cry for the Japanese armed forces in World War II."

In the present day, Yamato-damashii is historically associated with Japanese nationalism, but is commonly used in Nihonjinron discussions and sports media. It is the motto for the international Purebred mixed martial arts school headed by Japanese-American Enson Inoue.

Synthesis comes to an end only when antithesis ceases to appear. For many centuries Japan found its most significant antithesis in China. During the last century and a half the West has been the antithetical term in the dialectic, and as always it has been in that "other" that Japan has sought its own image, peering anxiously for signs of its own identity into the mirror of the rest of the world. After the challenge of Western technology has been successfully met, one wonders what will be left that is "alien," besides the very fact that the historically necessary "other" is lacking. In that case, "Japanese spirit" (Yamato-damashii) will find itself face to face with the most frightening "other" of all – its lack – at which point opposition must cease or else feed upon itself. (1986:52-3)

== Definitions ==
Racially and ethnically offensive words are problematic for dictionaries. Lexicographers and publishers have editorial policies for treating ethnic slurs and insults. For example, The American Heritage Dictionary of the English Language (4th ed., 2000) defines Jap as "Offensive Slang. Used as a disparaging term for a person of Japanese birth or descent."

Michael Carr argues that Yamato-damashii (1994:280-1) "significantly differs from everyday racist slurs because it is not an overt insult, it is the opposite: an ethnic adulation. It belongs to a special category of benedictions such as Manifest Destiny or Chosen People that imply national, racial, or ethnic self-conceit."

Carr lexicographically analyzed Yamato-damashii definitions among modern general-purpose Japanese dictionaries from four publishers, namely, Daijisen (Shōgakukan, 1986), Daijirin (Sanseidō, 1988), Nihongo Daijiten (Kōdansha, 1989), and Kōjien (Iwanami, 1991).

For instance, this definition from the popular Daijirin dictionary gives the kanji 大和魂, modern and historical kana spellings, two meanings, synonyms, and usage examples from Japanese literature.

やまとだましい［―だましひ］4 【《大和》魂】①大和心。和魂。（漢学を学んで得た知識に対して）日本人固有の実務・世事などを処理する能力・知恵をいう。「才(ざえ)を本としてこそ、―の世に用ゐらるる方も強う侍らめ〔出典： 源氏（乙女）〕」 「露、―無かりける者にて〔出典： 今昔 二十〕」②( 近世以降の国粋思想の中で用いられた語)日本民族固有の精神。日本人としての意識。
yamato ... -damashii, -damashiFi "type 4" [accent on da] 【《大和》魂】1. yamato-gokoro. wakon. (in contrast to knowledge obtained from studying Chinese classics) Japanese people's characteristic ability or wisdom/intelligence for managing/treating actual things and worldly affairs. The Tale of Genji (The Maiden [chapter]) "Without a solid foundation of book-learning this 'Japanese spirit' of which one hears so much is not of any great use in the world." [Tales of] Times Now Past (20) "He did not have the slightest knowledge of the Japanese spirit." 2. (term used in ultra-nationalistic ideology of recent times) characteristic mentality of the Japanese race/people. Consciousness/awareness of being a Japanese person. (tr. Carr 1994:288)

Collectively, these four definitions provide insights into what Yamato-damashii means in current Japanese usage. They all distinguish two basic meanings: ① "A Japanese practical ability; opposed to Chinese scholarship" and ② "A traditional (bushido/nationalistic) concept of death-defying valor". When two or more definitions use identical terminology, it suggests consensus on semantics. For instance, while the dictionaries split on whether meaning ① refers to Nihon-minzoku (日本民族 "Japanese race/people/nation") or Nihon-jin (日本人 "Japanese person/people"), all four state that the nationalistic meaning ② refers to Nihon-minzoku.

For meaning ①, the most salient word (used seven times) is koyū (固有 "inherent; innate; characteristic; special quality"). This sense is defined as a noryoku (能力 "ability, capability; competency") or chie (知恵 "wisdom; insight; intelligence"), which pertains to jisseikatsujōno (実生活上 "real life; everyday/practical reality') or jitsumutekina (実務的な "actual things, practical experience").

For meaning ②, all the definitions describe a seishin (精神 "mind; mentality; spirit; soul; genius"). Specifically a "Japanese spirit" with kakan (果敢 "boldness; courage; daring; determination"), yūmō (勇猛 "bravery; valor; intrepidness; daring"), and shinmei o mo oshimanai (身命をも惜しまない "without regard for one's life"), especially when koto ni atatte (事に当たって "facing a vital matter; in case of crisis"). Purity is mentioned with seijo (清浄 "purity; cleanliness") and isagiyoi (潔い "pure; clean; honorable; gallant; brave").

Within this dictionary sample, only the Nihongo daijiten qualifies Yamato-damashii as a characteristic that is to sareta (とされた "assumed, supposed; alleged'"), whereas the other three define it as a matter of fact. Carr concludes (1994:290), "Believing that all individuals of any race or nationality share certain "spiritual" characteristics is at best overgeneralization, or at worst racism."

Some monolingual English dictionaries enter Yamato or Yamato-e, but only the Oxford English Dictionary enters Yamato-damashii.

Yamato (ja'mato) [Jap., = 'Japan']

1. The style or school of art in Japan which culminated in the 12th and 13th centuries and dealt with Japanese subjects in a distinctively Japanese (rather than Chinese) way. Usu. as Yamato-e (†-we) [e picture]; also –ryū [-ryū style, orig. stream, school]. …

2. Yamato-damashii: the Japanese spirit. … (v. 3, 2002)

The OED gives three usage examples, starting with Yamato-damashi (1942, Royal Air Force Journal, "He will be filled with what is called yamato damashi [sic] or the pure spirit of Japan.") and Yamato-damashii (1957, Encyclopædia Britannica). Note that the 1904 Hearn quotation above antedates this 1942 citation.

Most Japanese-English dictionaries literally translate Yamato-damashii as "the Japanese spirit". For instance, Kenkyūsha's New Japanese-English Dictionary (5th ed., 2003) enters Yamato "やまと【大和】 Yamato; (old) Japan" along with 14 subentries, including Yamato-damashii "大和魂 the Japanese spirit" and Yamato-gokoro "大和心 the Japanese spirit; the Japanese sensibility."

The online Encyclopedia of Shinto (linked below, note the pronunciation file) comprehensively defines Yamato-damashii.

Literally, "Japanese spirit"; Yamato damashii is also written 大和魂. This term is often contrasted with "Chinese Learning" (karasae), that is, knowledge and scholarship imported into Japan from China. Yamato damashii refers to an inherent faculty of common-sense wisdom, resourcefulness, and prudent judgment that is characteristic of, and unique to, the Japanese people. It also refers to a practical, "real life" ability and intelligence that is in contrast with scholarship and knowledge acquired through formal education. It is a term used to express such ideas as the essential purity and resolute spirit of the Japanese people, the wish for the peace and security of the nation, and the possession of a strong spirit and emotion that will meet any challenge, even at the expense of one's own life. Yamato damashii is synonymous with Yamato gokoro (lit. "Japanese heart").

== See also ==
- Sēshin Nihonjin
- Russian soul
- Yamato nationalism
- Yankee ingenuity
