= Tōji-in =

Buddhist temple in kyoto, Japan

Coordinates: 35°1′53.58″N 135°43′24.49″E

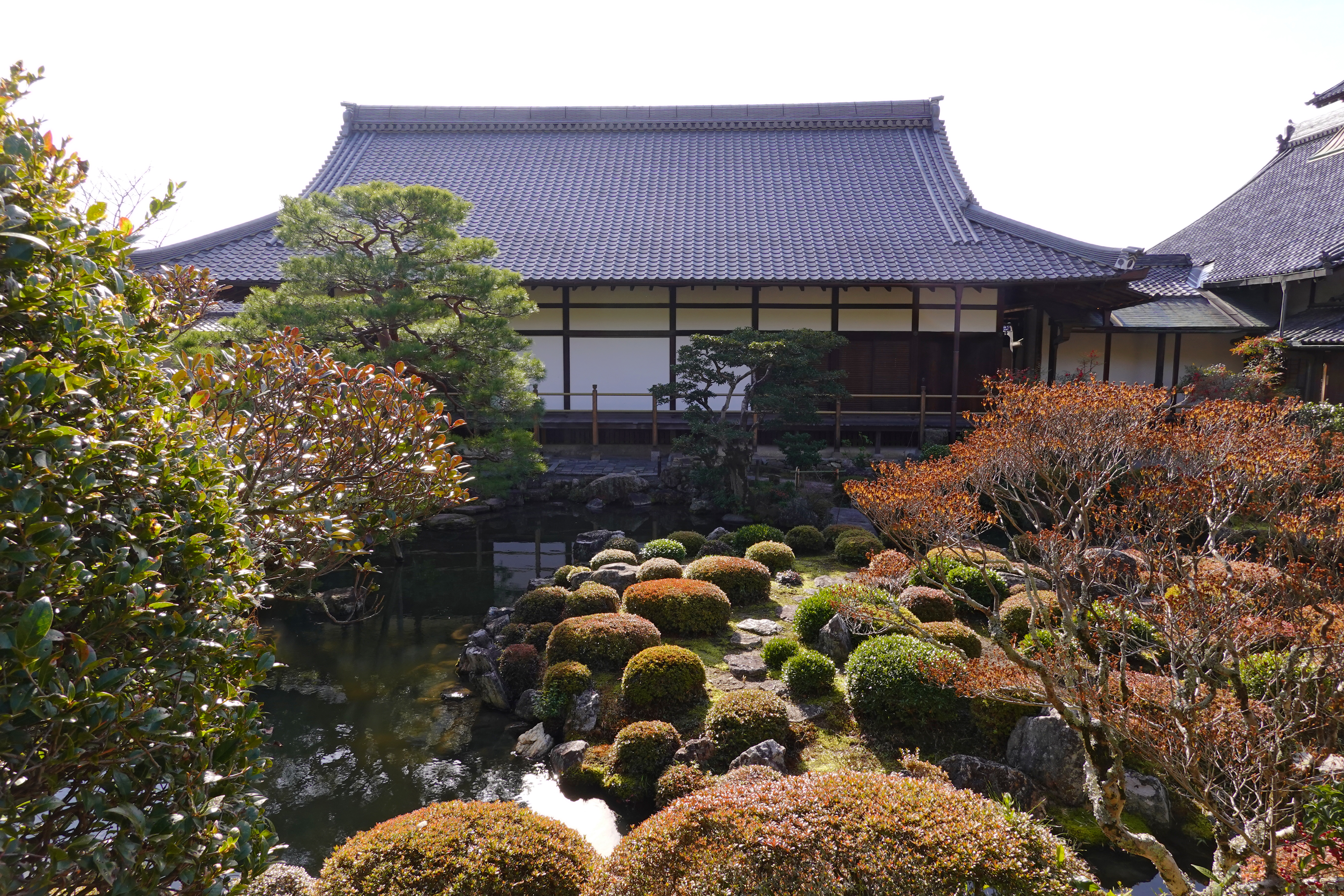
- The Main Hall

Religion
- Affiliation: Rinzai, Tenryū sect

Location
- Location: Kitamachi 63, Tōji-in, Kita-ku, Kyoto
- Country: Japan
- Interactive map of Tōji-in

Architecture
- Founder: Ashikaga Takauji, Musō Soseki
- Completed: 1341

Tōji-in (等持院) is a Buddhist temple of the Rinzai Tenryū sect located in Kita Ward, Kyoto, Japan, and one of two funeral temples (bodaiji) dedicated to Ashikaga Takauji, first shōgun of the Ashikaga dynasty. Its main object of worship is Shakyamuni, and its honorary sangō prefix is Mannenzan (萬年山).

== History ==
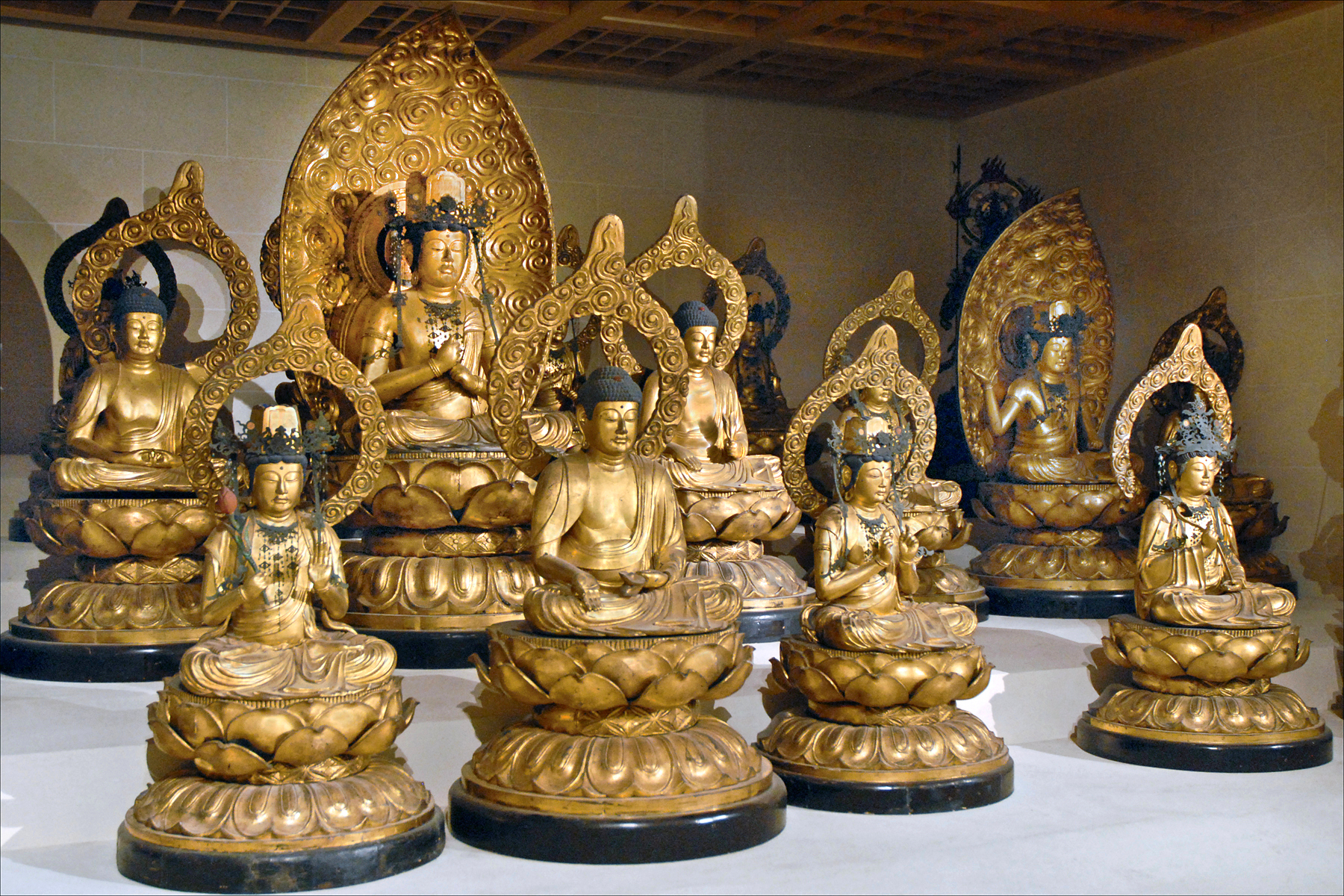
Great mandala of the Tôji imperial temple in Kyoto (detail) Photo taken in 2011 in the Heidelbach hotel, annex of the Guimet museum.

Tōji-in was founded at the foot of Mount Kinugasa in 1341 by Takauji himself in fulfillment of a vow. He did so under the guidance of famous Zen teacher, calligraphist, poet and garden designer Musō Soseki, who created the Zen gardens and ponds of the temple. Tōji-in later became the Ashikaga dynasty's funeral temple and all fifteen of the Ashikaga shōguns are buried here. The temple's name was later chosen as one of Takauji's two posthumous names, Tōji-inden (等持院殿). (The other is Chōju-inden, from the name of Takauji's second bodaiji. See footnote.) Tōji-in was number one of the Kyoto Jissetsu, the temples immediately below the Kyoto Gozan within the Five Mountain System nationwide network of Zen temples.

Because of its association with the Ashikaga, believed by the Emperor's supporters to be traitors because they had usurped imperial power, during the Meiji restoration the temple sustained some damage. In recent years the temple has been restored to increase its appeal as a tourist attraction.

== Temple precincts and gardens ==
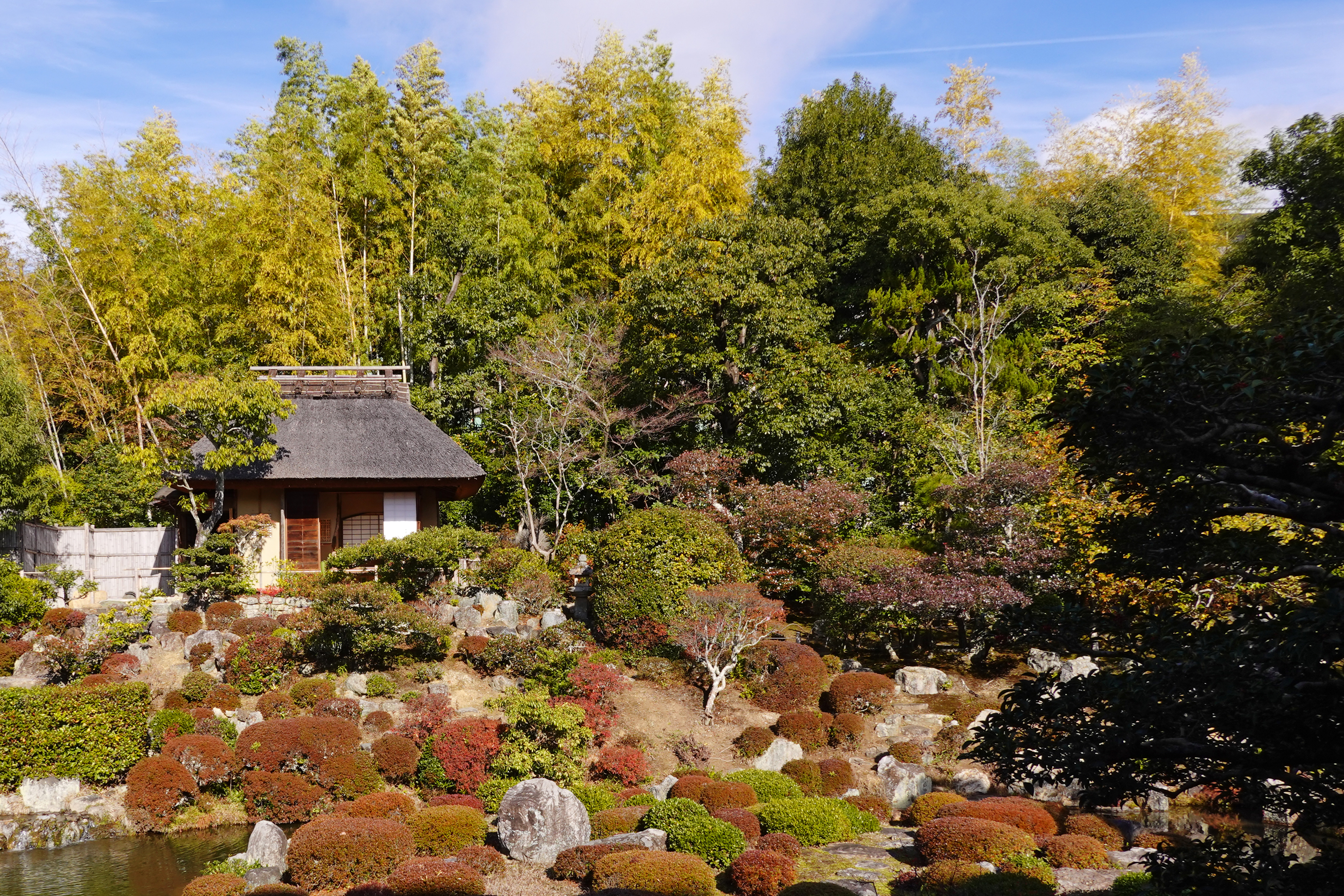
The garden and the Seirentei (清漣亭)

The Main Hall (hondō) was originally a tacchū (subtemple) of Myōshin-ji built in 1616 by order of samurai Fukushima Masanori. The garden, the ponds, and the Seirentei (清漣亭) tearoom were designed by Musō Soseki. Tōji-in's treasure owns a drawing of the temple which is an Important Cultural Property.

=== Reikō-den ===
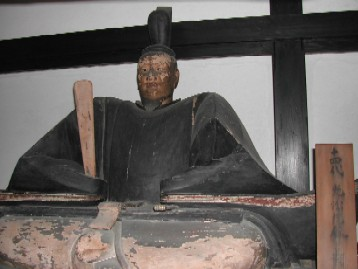
The statue of Ashikaga Yoshiteru at the Reikō-den

Tokugawa Ieyasu and all the fifteen Ashikaga shōguns are enshrined in a small building called Reikō-den (霊光殿). The sixteen statues, which are of limited artistic value, are lined up in two rows on the sides of the room, each sitting and carrying a shaku symbolizing their shogunal power. Their sculptors are unknown, but they have been tentatively dated to the early seventeenth century. The presence among the Ashikaga shōguns of a statue of Tokugawa Ieyasu, founder of the Tokugawa shogunate, suggests that Tokugawa wished to link himself to the Ashikaga clan and give an impression of continuity between the two dynasties. Like them, Ieyasu claimed to be a descendant of the Minamoto clan.

In 1863 nine men broke into the Reikō-den and stole the heads of the first three Ashikaga shōguns, Takauji, Yoshiakira and Yoshimitsu, as a form of revenge for their role in usurping the emperor's power during the Nanbokuchō period. The severed heads were then exposed on the banks of the Kamo river together with placards listing their crimes against the nation.

== Bibliography ==
- Daijirin, 2nd edition
- Daijisen, 1st edition
- Encyclopedia Nipponica accessed on April 26, 2009
- Keene, Donald (2005). Yoshimasa and the Silver Pavilion: The Creation of the Soul of Japan (Asia Perspectives: History, Society, and Culture). Columbia University Press. ISBN 978-0-231-13057-8.
- Kōjien 6th edition, DVD Version
- Mansfield, Stephen (2011). Japan's Master Gardens (Hardback). Tokyo, Rutland, Singapore: Tuttle. p. 144. ISBN 978-4-8053-1128-8.
