= Izuru =

Izuru may refer to the fictional characters:

- Izuru Kira, a Soul Reaper featured in the Japanese manga and anime series Bleach
- Izuru Kamukura, the mastermind behind "The Tragedy" in the Japanese media franchise Danganronpa

== People ==
- Izuru Narushima (成島 出, born 1961), Japanese scriptwriter and film director
- Shinmura Izuru (新村 出, 1876–1967), Japanese linguist and essayist
- Izuru Takeuchi (竹内 出, born 1974), Japanese mixed martial artist
