= EPWING =

Standard format for electronic dictionaries

EPWING (Japanese: イーピーウィング) is the standard format for electronic dictionaries, primarily used for Japanese. A subset of EPWING V1 is standardized as JIS X 4081 ("Retrieval Data Structure for Japanese Electronic Publication").

== History ==
In 1986, Fujitsu, Iwanami Shoten, Sony and Dai Nippon Printing worked together to publish a new CD-ROM edition of Kōjien. They created a specification called "WING".

In 1988, after CD-ROM was standardized as ISO 9660, the WING specification was renamed to "EPWING" ("Electronic Publishing WING").

== File structure ==
The basic structure of EPWING is as follows:

.
└── Catalogs
    └── <Dictionary Name>
        ├── DATA
        │   └── HONMON
        └── GAIJI
            ├── GA16FULL
            └── GA16HALF

The "HONMON" under "DATA" contains the index of pictures, audio data, and texts. External character data are placed under "GAIJI". The file names of external character data may differ between dictionaries.

== Software ==
=== Commercial software ===
- ViewIng

=== Others (free/shared) ===
- GoldenDict
- EBWin4
- EBView
- qolibri

== Software capable of reading EPWING ==
- Yomitan – A browser extension
- ebviewer
