= Kotobank =

Japanese search website

- Website type: Online encyclopedia
- Available in: Japanese
- Owners: Carta Holdings, Inc. Voyage Marketing
- Website: kotobank.jp
- Registration: Not required
- Current status: Active

Kotobank (コトバンク, Kotobanku) is a Japanese-language online encyclopedia which allows users to search across dictionaries, encyclopedias, and databases provided by publishers and others. It is operated by Voyage Marketing Co. At launch, the service's name was in rōmaji, but has since been stylized in katakana.

== History ==
In June 2008, The Asahi Shimbun and EC Navi Inc. launched the "Minna no Chiezo" service, an online version of "Chiezo," a dictionary of modern terms that was once published. The service was rebuilt as a dictionary platform in which various companies could participate. The "kotobank" service was launched on April 23, 2009, under the management of The Asahi Shimbun and EC Navi Inc. At launch, it claimed to cover a total of 430,000 entries from 44 dictionaries and encyclopedias, the core of which were provided by Kodansha, Shogakukan, and Asahi Shimbun Publishing. As the site had strong ties with The Asahi Shimbun, related news from The Asahi Shimbun's website, asahi.com, appeared on its pages.

The Asahi Shimbun and Genesix began distributing the "kotobank for iPhone" electronic dictionary platform application for the iPhone in March 2011. In October 2011, EC Navi, which had been operating the site, changed its name to Voyage Group Inc.

On October 1, 2019, following a corporate reorganization of Voyage Group Inc, Voyage Marketing Inc, a subsidiary of Carta Holdings, will operate the company. In April 2021, The Asahi Shimbun logo disappeared from the site, leaving only Voyage Marketing; the registered trademark was also transferred Voyage Marketing. At the same time, the link to Kotobank on The Asahi Shimbun homepage was also removed.

== Reliability ==
When the service was launched in 2009, The Asahi Shimbun and other operators pointed out the unreliability of information on the Internet and stated, "We aim to be the largest free glossary site in Japan with high reliability, quality and searchability of information. We will build a highly reliable website," said Hiromi Onishi, head of the Digital Media Division at The Asahi Shimbun.

The National Diet Library's Collections and Bibliography Department states that items listed in the Kotobank may be used as a reference when establishing new ordinary subjects in the National Diet Library's Subject Headings List if they "exist in book form, such as the Encyclopedia MyPedia, or are successors to it," and "the explanations of words and phrases are general rather than intended for specific users.

== See also ==
- Weblio - Similar services that allow batch searching from many dictionaries
