= Satoshi Kinsui =

Japanese linguist (born 1956)

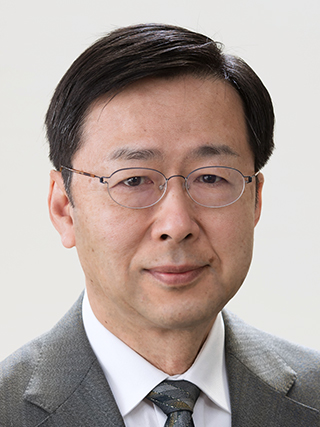
Satoshi Kinsui in 2021

Satoshi Kinsui (金水 敏, Kinsui Satoshi; born 29 April 1956) is a Japanese linguist who is currently a professor at Osaka University.

== Biography ==
Born in Osaka, Kinsui currently lives in the city of Nishinomiya in Hyōgo Prefecture. He graduated with a bachelor's degree from the University of Tokyo Department of Literature in Japanese literature. He then enrolled in the Department of Literature's graduate program in Japanese literature, but withdrew in 1982 to work as a tutor within the department. In 1983, he began working as a lecturer in the Kobe University Department of Education and moved to the Osaka Women's University in 1987. In 1990, he accepted a position as an assistant professor in the Kobe University Department of Literature. He moved to Osaka University in 1998, where he was promoted to a full professorship in 2001. His research interests cover a wide variety of areas from classical to modern forms of Japanese, and in recent years he has been carrying out his research while advocating for and spreading awareness of the concept of yakuwarigo ("role language").

In 2006, he was awarded the Shinmura Izuru Prize for his book Nihongo sonzai hyōgen no rekishi.

Currently, he is a trustee of the Society for Japanese Linguistics, a committee member of the Linguistic Society of Japan, director of the Association for Natural Language Processing, vice president and committee member of the Society for Japanese Grammar and a member of the Science Council of Japan.

== Bibliography ==
=== Solo publications ===
- Vācharu nihongo: yakuwarigo no nazo, Iwanami Shoten Publishers, 2003. ("Virtual Japanese: The Mystery of Role Language")
- Nihongo sonzai hyōgen no rekishi, Hituzi Syobo Publishing, 2006. ("A History of Japanese Existential Expressions")
- Kore mo Nihongo aru ka?: Ijin no kotoba ga umareru toki, Sou dattanda! Nihongo Series, Iwanami Shoten Publishers, 2014. ("Is this also Japanese?: The Birth of Foreigner Speak")

=== Collaborative publications ===
- Nihongo bunpō serufu masutā shirīzu 4: Shijishi, Kuroshio Publishers, 1989. ("Japanese Grammar Self-Master Series 4: Demonstratives")
  - Copublished with Hideki Kimura and Yukinori Takubo.
- Gendai nihongo nyūmon 4: Imi to bunmyaku, Iwanami Shoten Publishers, 2000. ("Introduction to Modern Japanese 4: Meaning and Context")
  - Copublished with Ikumi Imani
- Nihongo no bunpō 2: Toki to hitei no toritate, Iwanami Shoten Publishers, 2000. ("Japanese Grammar 2: Focus and Time/Negative Expressions")
  - Copublished with Mayumi Kudō and Yoshiko Numata.
- Iwanami kōza gengo no kagaku 5: Bunpō, Iwanami Shoten Publishers, 2005. ("Iwanami Course Series, The Science of Language 5: Grammar")
  - Copublished with Takao Gunji, Yoshi Nitta, and Takashi Masuoka.
- Shirīzu Nihongoshi 4: Nihongoshi no intāfēsu, Iwanami Shoten Publishers, 2008. ("Japanese Language History Series 4: The Japanese Language History Interface"
  - Copublished with Yoshihiko Inui and Katsumi Shibuya.
- Shirīzu Nihongoshi 3: Bunpōshi, Iwanami Shoten Publishers, 2011. ("Japanese Language History Series 3: The History of Grammar")
  - Copublished with Yoshiyuki Takayama, Tomohide Kinuhata, and Tomoko Okazaki.

=== Edited works ===
- Yakuwarigo kenkyū no chihei, Kuroshio Publishers, 2007. ("Ground-Level Role Language Research")
- Yakuwarigo kenkyū no tenkai, Kuroshio Publishers, 2011. ("Role Language Research Developments")
- "Yakuwarigo" shōjiten, Kenkyusha, 2014. ("'Role Language' Mini-Dictionary")
- Dorama to hōgen no atarashii kankei: 'Kānēshon' kara 'Yae no zakura', soshite 'Amachan' e, Kasama Shoin, 2014.
  - Coedited with Yukari Tanaka and Minako Okamuro.
