= Russian soul =

Shared values of the Russian people

The term "Russian soul" (Russian: русская душа, russkaya dusha) is "a prominent cultural stereotype centered on mental, emotional, and spiritual concepts" It has been used in literature in reference to the uniqueness of the Russian national identity. The term is also sometimes denoted as "great Russian soul" (Russian: великая русская душа, velikaya russkaya dusha), "mysterious Russian soul" (Russian: загадочная русская душа, zagadochnaya russkaya dusha), or "Russian spirit" (Russian: русский дух, russkiy dukh). The writings of many Russian writers such as Nikolai Gogol, Leo Tolstoy and Fyodor Dostoevsky offer descriptions of the Russian soul. Today, the concept is rendered stereotypical and described as a myth, especially when applied to Russian population in its entirety.

== The term ==
The concept of a Russian soul arose in the 1840s chiefly as a literary phenomenon. Writer Nikolai Gogol and literary critic Vissarion Belinsky jointly coined the term upon the publication of Gogol's masterpiece Dead Souls in 1842. At the time landowners often referred to their serfs as "souls" for accounting purposes, and the novel's title refers to the protagonist's scheme of purchasing claims to deceased serfs. Apart from this literal meaning, however, Gogol also intended the title as an observation of landowners' loss of soul in exploiting serfs.

Belinsky, a notedly radical critic, took Gogol's intentions a few steps farther and inferred from the novel a new recognition of a national soul, existing apart from the government and founded in the lives of the lower class. Indeed, Belinsky used the term "Russian soul" several times in his analyses of Gogol's work, and from there the phrase grew in prominence, and eventually became more clearly defined through the writings of authors such as Fyodor Dostoevsky. This famous brand of nationalism, however, was the product of a continuous effort by Russia's various classes to define a national identity. According to Dostoevsky, "the most basic, most rudimentary spiritual need of the Russian people is the need for suffering, ever-present and unquenchable, everywhere and in everything."

Gogol and his contemporaries established literature as Russia's new weapon of choice, the tool by which it could inform itself of its greatness and urge the nation to its destined position as a world leader. Gogol may not have had such grand notions, but with the help of Belinsky he paved the way for a new concept of Russian identity – the great Russian soul. As opposed to the preceding "Russian spirit" (Русский дух), which focused on Russia's past, "Russian soul" was an expression of optimism. It stressed Russia's historical youth and its ability, by following the wisdom of the peasant, to become the savior of the world. Indeed, although the concept of the Russian soul grew upon Western ideas, its advocates believed that Russia had made those ideas its own and would use them to save Europe from itself. The term Russian soul is also to be found in Russian folk culture.

== Culmination of the concept ==
=== Dostoevsky ===
The Russian soul evolved and entered into Western consciousness in the following decades, most famously through the work of Fyodor Dostoevsky. In his novels and stories, Dostoevsky exhibited an often anti-European nationalism and frequently suggested a "people's spirit" held together by "unexpressed, unconscious ideas which are merely strongly felt". By Dostoevsky's death in 1881, the "Russian soul" had completed its evolution in Russia. Dostoevsky had the following opinion about the freedom and strength of the Russian soul:

It's frightening how free a Russian man's spirit is, how strong is his will! No one has ever been so much torn away from his native soil, as he sometimes had to be; nobody ever took a turn so sharp, as he, following his own belief!

=== After Dostoevsky ===
From about 1880 to 1930, largely thanks to Dostoevsky, the "Russian soul" concept spread to other countries and began to affect foreign perception of the Russian people. For many Europeans the idea offered a positive alternative to the typical view of Russians as backward, instead depicting the Russian people as an example of the innocence the West had lost. The popularity of the "Russian soul" continued into the 20th century but faded as Soviet power increased. By the 1930s the concept was slipping into obscurity, but it would survive in the work of the numerous writers who devised it.

== See also ==
- Yamato-damashii
- Yankee ingenuity
- Great American Novel

== Bibliography ==
- Apresjan, Valentina (2010-05-01). "The Myth of the "Russian Soul" Through the Mirror of Language". FOLKLORICA - Journal of the Slavic, East European, and Eurasian Folklore Association. 14. The Myth of the “Russian Soul” Through the Mirror of Language. doi:10.17161/folklorica.v14i.
