= Weblio =

- Website type: Online dictionary
- Available in: Japanese
- Country of origin: Japan
- Owners: GRAS Group, Inc.
- Website: weblio.jp
- Commercial: Yes
- Launched: January 25, 2006 (20 years ago)
- Current status: Active

Weblio is a free integrated bilingual dictionary website and online encyclopedia for Japanese-speaking sites operated by the GRAS Group, Inc. (GRASグループ株式会社), formerly known as the Weblio Corporation (ウェブリオ株式会社). Weblio can perform a bulk search on a variety of dictionaries, encyclopedias and glossaries, and return results. The dictionary facility includes Kenkyūsha's New Japanese-English Dictionary and 70 other Japanese–English and English–Japanese dictionaries with 4,160,000 English words and 4,730,000 Japanese words. As of January 20, 2016, a total of 665 dictionaries, encyclopedias and glossary sites can be searched in full.

== History ==
Beta testing began on December 12, 2005, and the site began to formally provide services searching 11 different dictionaries and encyclopedias on January 25, the following year.
