= Kenkyusha's New Japanese-English Dictionary =

Japanese-English dictionary published by Kenkyūsha

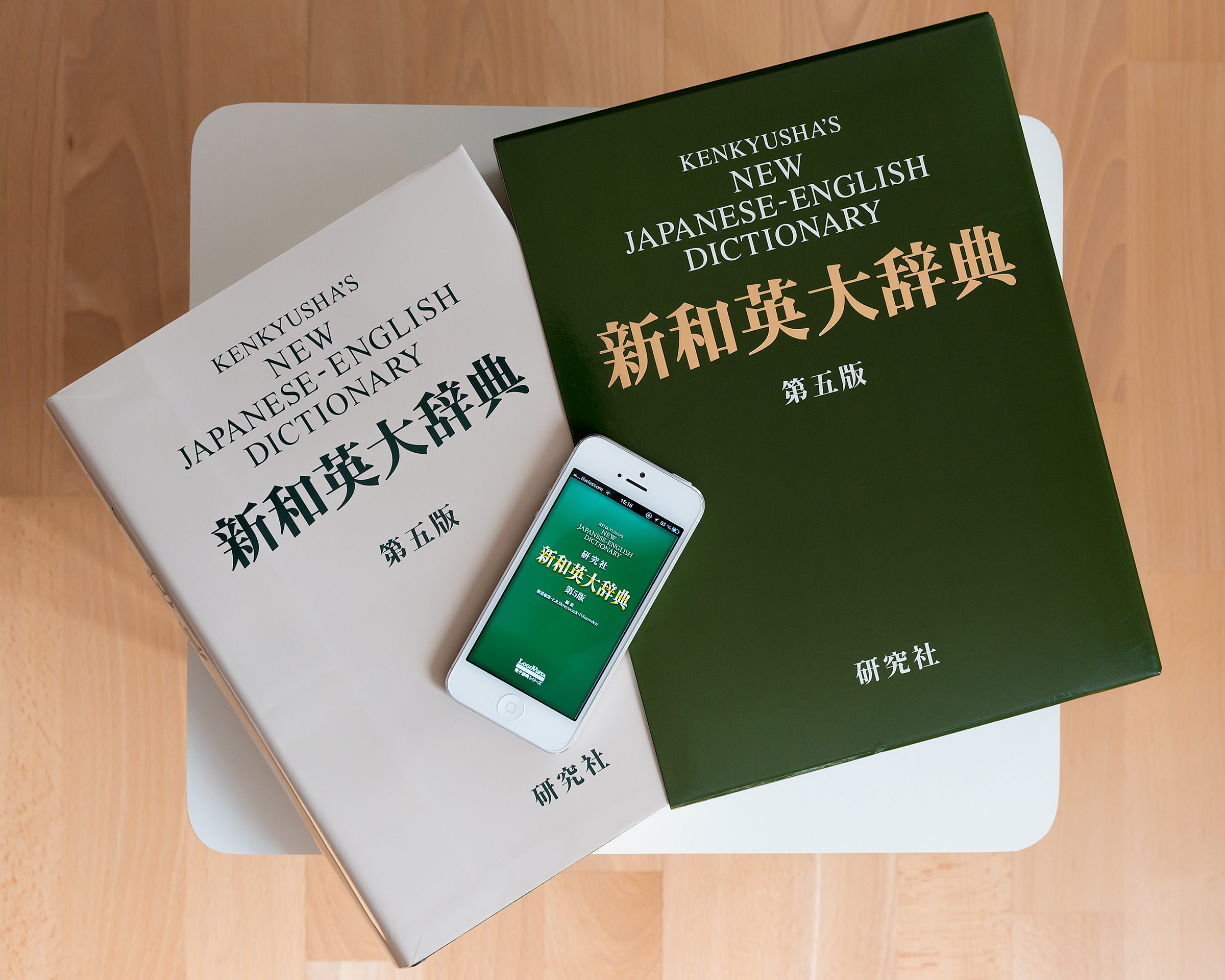
The Kenkyūsha New Japanese-English Dictionary 5th Edition with leather back and the iPhone Edition running on an iPhone 5.

First published in 1918, Kenkyusha's New Japanese-English Dictionary (新和英大辞典, Shin wa-ei daijiten) has long been the largest and most authoritative Japanese-English dictionary. Translators, scholars, and specialists who use the Japanese language affectionately refer to this dictionary as the Green Goddess or GG because of its distinctive dark-green cover.

The fifth edition, published in 2003, is a volume with almost 3,000 pages; it contains about 480,000 entries (including 130,000 Japanese headwords, 100,000 compound words, and 250,000 example phrases and sentences), nearly all of which are accompanied by English translations. The editors in chief of the fifth edition are Toshiro Watanabe, Edmund R. Skrzypczak, and Paul Snowden.

Besides the print edition, the dictionary is also available on CD-ROM (EPWING format), online, and in electronic dictionary and iPhone versions. Electronic dictionaries that contain the fifth edition are generally flagship models. They include the Canon Wordtank G70, the Seiko SR-E10000 (the first electronic dictionary with GG) and SR-G10000, and the Casio "University Student" series (XD-D9800 in 2012) (Note: Casio model numbers change every year; models in the same "University Student" line, which contained the Kenkyūsha, are XD-GP9600 (2007), XD-GP9700 (2008), XD-GF9800 (2009), XD-A9800 (2010), XD-B9800 (2011), and XD-D9800 (2012).) and "Professional" series (XD-D10000 in 2012). (Note: Casio model numbers change every year; models in the same "Professional" line, which contained the Kenkyūsha, are XD-GF10000 (2009), XD-A10000 (2010), XD-B10000 (2011), and XD-D100000.) The Sharp PW-SB2, PW-SB3, PW-SB4 and PW-SB5 models also contain the full Kenkyusha dictionary. For both Casio and Sharp at least, the dictionary is also available on an SD or micro SD card that can be purchased separately for certain models.

There is also a companion English-Japanese dictionary, currently in its 6th edition, which contains 260,000 headwords.

== History ==
In 1918, the publication of the first edition of Kenkyusha's New Japanese–English Dictionary, Takenobu's Japanese–English Dictionary (武信和英大辞典, Takenobu wa-ei daijiten), named after the editor-in-chief, Takenobu Yoshitarō (武信 由太郎), was a landmark event in the field of lexicography in Japan. Completed in under five years with the assistance and support of leading scholars in the field, and published when Kenkyūsha (研究社) was still a minor academic publishing company, the Takenobu was the most authoritative Japanese–English dictionary of the time, and cemented Kenkyūsha's reputation in the field of academic publishing.

In 1931, Kenkyūsha undertook a major revision in the dictionary by expanding upon former entries and adding newer ones. The British diplomat George Sansom, who later became a renowned historian of Japan, was a major contributor and editor of this edition. Aside from the ever-evolving nature of the Japanese and English languages, competition from two other major dictionaries released in the 1920s – Takehara's Japanese–English Dictionary and Saitō's Japanese–English Dictionary, both of which were larger than the first edition of Kenkyūsha's – was probably a major driving force behind these revisions (although new editions of these dictionaries were never released, allowing Kenkyūsha's to assert and maintain its dominance among Japanese–English dictionaries). From this second edition onward, the dictionary became known as Kenkyusha's New Japanese–English Dictionary. During World War II, reputable institutions in the United States and Great Britain, including Harvard University's Department of Far Eastern Languages, produced pirated versions of this dictionary for the war effort.

Because of the Pacific War, Kenkyūsha did not revise the dictionary for almost 20 years until 1949, when it decided to incorporate the many new borrowings from English that resulted from the American occupation of Japan. After five years of revision, Kenkyūsha published its third edition in 1954. Beginning with this edition and continuing through the 1974 fourth edition, the editors attempted to make the dictionary into a more scholarly work by citing English language expressions from English texts, particularly from literature; this, however, resulted in clumsy, artificial-sounding Japanese and English. The editors abandoned this practice for the fifth edition, which has entries that sound more natural to both native-Japanese and native-English speakers.

== Publications ==
- 1st Edition (1918)
- 2nd Edition (1931)
  - 82nd impression (1939-??-??)
  - 91st impression (1941-??-??)
  - Harvard University Press edition (Kenkyusha's New Japanese-English Dictionary American Edition): A photolithographic reprint of the 82nd printing of the Japanese dictionary, with enlarged print size.
    - ?th impression (1942)
- 3rd Edition (1954). Headlines sorted by Romanized alphabet. The romanization system published in this edition is often considered authoritative for fixing the Modified Hepburn, also known as Revised Hepburn romanization.
- 4th Edition (Kenkyusha's New Japanese-English Dictionary/新和英大辞典 第四版) (1974): Includes 80000 headwords, 100000 compound words and sentences, 50000 examples. Headlines sorted by Romanized alphabet. The romanization system is the same than the one in the previous edition (1954).
  - ISBN 0-7859-71289/ISBN 978-0-7859-7128-3
    - 1st impression (1974)
    - 4th impression (1978)
    - ?th impression (2003-01-01)
- 5th Edition (Kenkyusha's New Japanese-English Dictionary/新和英大辞典 第五版) (2003–07): Includes 130000 headwords, 100000 compound words, 250000 examples. Headlines sorted by kana.
  - ISBN 978-4-7674-2026-4 C7582 (hardcover), ISBN 978-4-7674-2016-5 C7582 (leather bound)
- Kenkyusha's New Japanese-English Dictionary PLUS (新和英大辞典・プラス) (2008-07): A supplement book for the 5th edition of the printed dictionary, which adds 40000 entries including colloquial terms from Kenkyusha's CD-ROM dictionary and Kenkyusha Online Dictionary.
  - ISBN 978-4-7674-2027-1 C0582 (includes Kenkyusha Online Dictionary 90-day free access CD-ROM)
- 6th Edition (Kenkyusha's New English-Japanese Dictionary/新英和大辞典 第六版) (2002–03): Includes 260000 entries.
  - ISBN 978-4-7674-1026-5 C0582 (softcover), ISBN 978-4-7674-1016-6 C0582 (hardcover)
- Kenkyusha's Bilingual Dictionary of Japanese Cultural Terms (和英 日本文化表現辞典) (2007-03): Includes 3500 headwords and compound words. Consists of revised entries about Japanese-specific culture, customs, seasonal events, food, modern terms from Kenkyusha's New Japanese-English Dictionary.
  - ISBN 978-4-7674-9053-3 C0582
- Kenkyusha's FURIGANA English-Japanese Dictionary (研究社 ふりがな英和辞典): Includes kana readings for Japanese entries.
  - ?th impression (1990-??-??)
- Kenkyusha's FURIGANA English-Japanese Dictionary Revised & Enlarged (研究社 ふりがな英和辞典 改訂増補版) (ISBN 978-4-7674-1173-6 C0582):
  - ?th impression (2008-07-??)

=== Learner's dictionaries ===
- The Kenkyusha Japanese-English Learner's Dictionary (日英辞典) (ISBN 978-4-7674-2300-5 C0582): Includes 10000 entries.
  - ?th impression (1992-07-??)

=== Learner's Pocket dictionaries ===
- The Kenkyusha Japanese-English Learner's Pocket Dictionary (研究社 日英ポケット辞典) (ISBN 978-4-7674-2305-0 C0582):
  - ?th impression (1993-07-??)
- The Kenkyusha English-Japanese Learner's Pocket Dictionary (研究社 英日ポケット辞典) (ISBN 978-4-7674-2310-4 C0582): Includes 7000 Japanese terms.
  - ?th impression (1996-07-??)
- The Kenkyusha Kenkyusha English-Japanese Japanese-English Learner's Pocket Dictionary (研究社 英日・日英ポケット辞典) (ISBN 978-4-7674-2315-9 C0582): Includes both English-Japanese and Japanese-English pocket dictionaries.
  - ?th impression (1996-07-??)
- Pocket Kenkyusha Japanese Dictionary (ISBN 978-0-198-60748-9): A version published by Oxford University Press. Includes 45,000 words and phrases, 64,000 translations.
  - ?th impression (2007-03-09)

=== By LogoVista Corporation ===
- Kenkyusha's New Japanese-English Dictionary
  - 5th edition
    - iOS version (新英和大辞典第5版)
      - Version 1.0.1 (iOS 3.0)
      - Version 1.1 (iOS 4.3)
      - Version 2.0 (iOS 4.3-7)
      - Version 2.1
      - Version 2.1.1
      - Version 2.1.2
      - Version 3.0 (iOS 6-8)
      - Version 3.1 (iOS 6-9)
      - Version 3.1.1
      - Version 3.1.2
- Kenkyusha's New English-Japanese Dictionary and Japanese-English Dictionary
  - English-Japanese Dictionary 7th edition and Japanese-English Dictionary 5th edition
    - iOS version (研究社新英和（第7版）和英（第5版）中辞典 音声付き)
      - Version 2.0.1 (2009-07-07, iOS 3.0 and later)
      - Version 2.0.2 (2009-09-02)
      - Version 2.0.3 (2009-11-02)
      - Version 3.0 (2010-09-08)
      - Version 3.0.1 (2010-09-18)
      - Version 3.0.2 (2010-10-05)
      - Version 3.0.3 (2010-11-15, iOS 4.2)
      - Version 3.1 (2011-04-15)
      - Version 3.1.1 (2011-10-19, iOS 5)
      - Version 3.1.2 (2012-05-03, iOS 5)
      - Version 3.1.3 (2012-05-23, iOS 5)
      - Version 3.2 (2013-09-17, iOS 4.3-7)
      - Version 3.2.1 (2013-09-18)
      - Version 3.2.2 (2013-10-05)
      - Version 4.0 (2014-10-05, iOS 8)
      - Version 4.0.1 (2014-10-13)
      - Version 4.0.2 (2014-12-05)
      - Version 4.1 (2015-03-16)
      - Version 4.1.1 (2015-06-15, iOS 8.3)
      - Version 4.2 (2016-01-15, iOS 9)
      - Version 4.2.1 (2016-01-26)
      - Version 4.2.2 (2016-02-29)
      - Version 4.2.3 (2016-03-21)
      - Version 4.2.4 (2017-05-16)
      - Version 4.2.5 (2017-05-18)
- The Kenkyusha Dictionary of English Collocations
  - 1st edition
    - iOS version (新編英和活用大辞典)
      - Version 1.0 (2009-05-08, iOS 3.2-5)
      - Version 1.1 ()
      - Version 1.1.1 ()
      - Version 2.0 (2013-11-04, iOS 4.3-7)
      - Version 2.0.1 (2014-09-25)
      - Version 3.0 (2014-10-05, iOS 6-8)
      - Version 3.0.1 (2014-10-13)
      - Version 3.1 (2015-03-27)
      - Version 3.1.1 (2015-05-20, iOS 6–8.3)
      - Version 3.2 (2015-12-18, iOS 6-9)
      - Version 3.2.1 (2016-03-11)
- The Kenkyusha English dictionary set: Includes English-Japanese dictionary 6th edition, Japanese-English dictionary 5th edition, English Collocations.
  - iOS version (研究社英語大辞典セット)
    - Version 1.0 (2016-05-12, iOS 8.1)

== Features ==
Compared to the 1974 fourth edition, the fifth edition represents a dramatic increase in the number of definitions (from roughly 290,000 terms to 480,000 terms). Furthermore, the organization of the words has changed from an alphabetical romaji-style system (「ローマ字見出し」方式) to the kana-based system (「かな見出し」方式) that is most commonly used in Japanese dictionaries and encyclopedias. This change reflects the fact that most users of the dictionary are native speakers of Japanese, who are more comfortable with the kana-based lookup system.

Other new features are:

- Larger numbers of katakana words and onomatopoeia words (e.g. ペラペラ perapera, ニコニコ nikoniko)
- More colloquial slang and pop culture words (a new definition: オブラデ・オブラダ 「曲名」 Ob-LA-Di Ob-La-Da)
- More specialized scientific and technological words (especially related to the recent Internet boom)
- More names of famous people, places, works of art, works of literature, etc.
- English translations that are more up-to-date and idiomatic, reflecting the greater participation of native English-speaking editors in the editorial process than for previous editions

The definitions themselves are also more expansive and detailed, as they often now include sample sentences.

- For example, under the definition for オフ・シーズン (off-season), a katakana word borrowed from English:
  - オフ・シーズンにはそのホテルはぐっと安くなる。 The off-season rates are much lower at that hotel.

Furthermore, there are also accompanying pictures and diagrams for words such as 馬 (horse) and サッカー (soccer).

At the end of the dictionary, there are some useful resources such as the entire Japanese Constitution; a chronological list of dates in Japanese history dating back to the Stone Age; a chronological list of dates in world history dating all the way back to the early civilizations that developed in Mesopotamia, the Nile valley, the Indus valley, and the Yellow River valley; charts on the proper formats of notices, envelopes, application letters, resumes, etc.; a section on email lingo and abbreviations; a section on the proper format of business cards; a section the proper format of help-wanted ads; a section on Japanese government titles; a section on American government titles; a chart on pronouncing Japanese kanji in Chinese; charts on the hierarchical organization of the Self-Defense Forces, the old Japanese military, the American military, and the English military; a chart on the names of all the countries in the world (along with currencies and measurement systems); and finally, a conversion chart between U.S. systems of measurement and the metric system.

The online version of the dictionary, available for a fee, is being updated on a monthly basis with new words and expanded entries.

== General references ==
- Koh Masuda, editor, Kenkyusha's New Japanese–English Dictionary, fourth edition (Tokyo: Kenkyūsha, 1974).
- Watanabe Toshirō (渡邊敏郎), Edmund R. Skrzypczak, and Paul Snowden, editors, Kenkyusha's New Japanese-English Dictionary (新和英大辞典), fifth edition (Tokyo: Kenkyusha, 2003).
