= Kenkyūsha =

Japanese academic publishing company

Kenkyusha Co., Ltd. 株式会社研究社
- Type: Public (unlisted)
- Industry: Publishing
- Founded: November 1907
- Headquarters: 〒102-8152 Fujimi 2-11-3 Chiyoda, Tokyo, Japan,
- Key people: Masao Sekido (representative Director), Goichirō Kosakai (founder)
- Products: dictionaries
- Subsidiaries: Kenkyūsha Publishing (研究社出版株式会社, Kenkyūsha Shuppan Kabushikigaisha)
- Website: kenkyusha.co.jp

The Kenkyusha Co., Ltd. (株式会社研究社, Kabushikigaisha Kenkyūsha) is a publishing house with headquarters in Chiyoda, Tokyo, Japan. Its product range is centered on foreign language—mainly English—dictionaries and textbooks. The name, Kenkyūsha, can be translated as "study/research company".

== History ==
The company was founded by Goichirō Kosakai as English Kenkyūsha (英語研究社, Eigo Kenkyūsha) in 1907 published the first edition of Elementary English Study (初等英語研究, Shotō Eigo Kenkyū) one year later. In 1916 the company's name was changed to its present: Kenkyūsha.

The predecessor of Senior High School English Study (高校英語研究, Kōkō Eigo Kenkyū) titled Examination and Student (受験と学生, Juken to Gakusei) was launched in 1917. The company extended its product range in 1918 with the Japanese-English Dictionary (和英大辞典, Wa-Ei Daijiten), a large dictionary, compiled by Yoshitarō Takenobu.

Kenkyūsha expands, establishing in 1919 a typesetting workshop on the slope of Kudan, a former street in Chiyoda, Tokyo, and — in 1920 — a printing house on Kagurazaka in Ushigome. In 1921, the first volume of the Eibungaku Series (英文学叢書, Eibungaku Sōsho) covering English literature appears. All of the 100 volumes are completed by 1932.

Due to reconstruction, in 1924, the printing house is temporarily moved to Iidamachi. 1927 sees the completion of the printing shop on Kagurazaka. Another press is established in 1939 in Kichijōji, west of central Tokyo. In 1944, Kenkyūsha receives an assignment from Aki Yasutarō for The Rising Generation (英語青年, Eigo Seinen), a monthly magazine aimed at researchers and students of English literature. In the same year, the Japanese scholar Fumio Nakajima publishes Eigo no Jōshiki (英語の常識). Three years later, the Fuji plate-making factory (富士整版工場, Fuji Seihan Kōjō) is founded. The printing business is split off in 1951 under the Kenkyūsha Printing Corporation.

In 1963 the company publishes The Kenkyūsha Shakespeare (詳注シェクスピア双書, Shōchū Shekusupia Sōsho) consisting of 12 volumes. A year later, Gendaieigo Kyōiku (現代英語教育) is launched together with the Gendaieigo Kyōiku Kōza (現代英語教育講座). A year after its 60th anniversary, in 1968, Kenkyūsha publishes Eigo Saijiki (英語歳時記) in five volumes.

The year 1984 saw big changes for the company. Kenkyūsha Printing built a new office in Nobidome, Niiza in Saitama Prefecture. The Fuji plate-making factory and the Kichijōji factory were moved to the new location and at the printing shop at Kudan, a typesetting factory was established.

== Dictionaries ==
Kenkyūsha has been publishing dictionaries in various sizes for almost one hundred years. The following list is a selection of dictionaries published by the company together with the years of publication.

- New English-Japanese Dictionary (新英和大辞典, Shin EiWa Daijiten): 1927 (1st) by Yoshisaburō Okakura, 1980 (5th), 2002 (6th)
- New Japanese-English Dictionary (新和英大辞典, Shin WaEi Daijiten): 1918 (1st) by Yoshitarō Takenobu, 2003 (5th)
- New College English-Japanese Dictionary (新英和中辞典; Shin Ei-Wa Chūjiten): 1967 (1st), 1994 (6th), 2003 (7th)
- New College Japanese-English Dictionary (新和英中辞典; Shin Wa-Ei Chūjiten): 1995 (4th), 2002 (5th)
- New Collegiate Japanese-English Dictionary (新和英中辞典): 1933 (1st), 1963 (2nd), 1983 (3rd)
- English-Japanese Dictionary for the General Reader (リーダーズ英和辞典, Ri-da-zu EiWa Jiten): 1984 (1st), 1999 (2nd)
- Japanese-English Dictionary for the General Reader (リーダーズ和英辞典, Ri-da-zu WaEi Jiten):
- Luminous English-Japanese Dictionary (ルミナス英和辞典, Ruminasu EiWa Jiten): 2005 (2nd)
- Luminous Japanese-English Dictionary (ルミナス和英辞典, Ruminasu WaEi Jiten): 2005 (2nd)
- Lighthouse English-Japanese Dictionary (ライトハウス英和辞典, Raitohausu EiWa Jiten): 1984 (1st), 1996 (3rd), 2002 (4th), 2007 (5th)
- Lighthouse Japanese-English Dictionary (ライトハウス和英辞典, Raitohausu WaEi Jiten): 1984 (1st), 1996 (3rd), 2002 (4th), 2008 (5th)
- College Lighthouse English-Japanese (カレッジライトハウス英和辞典, Karejji Raitohausu EiWa Jiten): 1995
- College Lighthouse Japanese-English (カレッジライトハウス和英辞典, Karejji Raitohausu WaEi Jiten): 1995
- English-Japanese Dictionary of Medical Science (医学英和辞典): 1999 (1st), 2008 (2nd)
- Deutsch-Japanisches Wörterbuch (独和中辞典, DokuWa Chūjiten): 1996
- Dictionary Of English Collocations (新編英和活用大辞典, Shinben EiWa Katsuyō Daijiten): 1995
- New Japanese-English Character Dictionary (新漢英字典, Shin Kanei Jiten): 1990
- Green Lighthouse English-Japanese Dictionary (グリーンライトハウス英和辞典, Guri-n Raitohausu EiWa Jiten): 1994
- An Encyclopedic Supplement to the Dictionary for the General Reader (リーダーズ・プラス, Ri-da-zu Purasu): 1994
- New College English-Japanese Japanese-English Dictionary E-book version (電子ブック版 新英和・和英中辞典): 1990

== Periodicals ==
- The Rising Generation: with the migration to the web edition, the publication was paused with the March issue 2009
- The study of current English (時事英語研究, Jiji Eigo Kenkyū) published from 1945 to 2000, Current English suspended in 2003
- Senior High School English Study (高校英語研究, Gōgō Eigo Kenkyū) suspended in 1997

== Subsidiaries ==
- Kenkyūsha Publishing (研究社出版株式会社, Kenkyūsha Shuppan Kabushikigaisha):

=== Former subsidiaries ===
- Kenkyusha Printing Co., Ltd (研究社印刷株式会社, Kenkyūsha Insatsu Kabushikigaisha): A printer for Kenkyusha Co., Ltd. In 1951-02-01, it became an independent company.
