= Daijisen =

Japanese dictionary

The Daijisen (大辞泉, "Great fountain of knowledge (wisdom)/source of words") is a general-purpose Japanese dictionary published by Shogakukan in 1995 and 1998. It was designed as an "all-in-one" dictionary for native speakers of Japanese, especially high school and university students.

== History ==
Shogakukan intended for the Daijisen to directly compete with Iwanami's popular Kōjien desktop dictionary, which was a bestseller through three editions (1955, 1969 and 1983). The Daijisen followed upon the success of two other Kōjien competitors, Sanseido's Daijirin ("Great forest of words", 1988, 1995, 2006) and Kōdansha's color-illustrated Nihongo Daijiten ("Great dictionary of Japanese", 1989, 1995). All of these dictionaries weigh around 1 kilogram (2.2 lb) and have about 3000 pages.

The 1st edition of the Daijisen (1995) included over 220,000 entries and 6000 all-color illustrations and photographs. The chief editor Akira Matsumura (松村明, Matsumura Akira; 1916–2001) was also chief editor of the directly competing Daijirin dictionary. Other Daijisen editors included Akihiko Ikegami (池上秋彦), Hiroshi Kaneda (金田弘), and Kazuo Sugizaki (杉崎一雄). Shogakukan also released a CD-ROM version (1997) of the 1st edition.

The "enlarged and revised" edition Daijisen (1998) was more of a revision than an enlargement, with 2978 pages versus 2938 in the 1st edition. Both editions claim "over 220,000 headwords".

== Characteristics ==
The Daijisen and Daijirin have much more in common than Matsumura's lexicographical supervision and similar ("Great fountain/forest of words") titles. These two dictionaries share many features of design and content. Both arrange word meanings with the most frequent ones first (like the American Heritage Dictionary), in contrast to the Kōjien tradition of arranging with the oldest recorded meanings first (like the Oxford English Dictionary). This can be seen in their two respective definitions of the word hyōsetsu (剽窃, "plagiarize"):

- Daijirin: "To take another person's works, theory, etc. and publish it as one's own." (他人の作品・学説などを自分のものとして発表すること。)
- Daijisen: "To steal another person's works or writing and publish it as one's own." (他人の作品や論文を盗んで、自分のものとして発表すること。)

Some similarities between these dictionaries are obvious: Matsumura's 2nd edition Daijirin (1995) added some full-color illustrations, including a chart of 168 color names (色の名) and his Daijisen (1995) included a color chart of 358 (カラーチャート色名).

The Daijisen is not wholly derivative of the Daijirin and has some notable differences. Daijisen improvements include visually appealing designs, more contemporary usage examples, and some helpful layout features. For instance, special columns indicate usage notes for topics including synonyms, suffixes, and even uncommon kanji pronunciations (nanori (名のり, "special readings for names") and nandoku (難読, "difficult to read").

== Publications ==
=== Print editions ===
- 1st edition (ISBN 9784095012117) (1995-12-01)
  - Revised edition (ISBN 9784095012124) (1998-?-?)
- 2nd edition (大辞泉【第二版】) (ISBN 9784095012131) (2012-11-02): Includes 250,000 entries, Windows DVD-ROM. 2 volumes.

=== Online search engines ===
The contents of the Daijisen have been used in other dictionary sites, including:

- Yahoo! Jisho (Yahoo!辞書)
- goo Jisho (goo辞書)
- kotobank (デジタル大辞泉)

The database versions are marked for April, August, December of every year, with updates delivered approximately every 4 months.

=== Electronic versions ===
- DVD edition: Included with the second edition of the printed book.
  - Ver.1.00 (2012-11-02)
  - Ver.2.00 (2013-10-03)
  - Ver.3.00 (2014-10-08)
  - Ver.4.00 (2015-11-26)
- Downloadable versions: Available for au Smart Pass, Android, iOS, Windows. The database versions and update schedules are same as the search engine versions.

== Reviews ==
The Japanese lexicographer Tom Gally analyzed the Daijisen:

This dictionary seems in many ways a clone of Daijirin. Not only is the same Tokyo University professor listed as editor – though it is important to note that the names appearing on the covers of Japanese dictionaries often have little relation to the people who actually did the work; one case in point being Koujien, even the most recent editions of which list as editor one 新村出 Shinmura Izuru, who has been dead since 1967 – but the definitions in Daijisen follow closely those of Daijirin as well. It also follows Daijirin's practice of putting the contemporary meanings first in its definitions. The two chief differences I've noticed are that Daijisen has color pictures while Daijirin uses line drawings – a rather obvious difference – and that the example sentences and phrases in Daijisen are more often typical of the contemporary language rather than citations from classical literature. This latter point makes Daijisen my first choice when I am writing Japanese and I want to check how words are used in context.

The bibliographer and cataloguer Yasuko Makino also described the Daijisen:

Over 220,000 words including archaic words, technical terms, geographical and personal names, and other proper names as well although focus is on modern words, are in this easy-to-use dictionary. Numerous examples of usage, explanation of delicate difference in the usage of each words, abundant inclusion of synonyms, and 6,000 all-color illustrations are a few of its strengths. One of the unique features of this dictionary is a listing of last elements, which functions as reverse-order dictionary. Includes detailed color charts. This works as kokugo jiten [Japanese–Japanese dictionary], kanwa jiten [Chinese–Japanese kanji dictionary], kogo jiten [Classical Japanese dictionary], katakanago jiten [katakana loanword dictionary], and encyclopedia.

This depiction echoes Shogakukan's blurb that the Daijisen is an "all-in-one, multi-functional dictionary" (オールインワン多機能辞典).

== Marketing ==
A Daijisen commercial (あなたの言葉を辞書に載せよう。) was listed as an ACC finalist in 2014 54th ACC CM Festival under the interactive division.

== Bibliography ==
- 一般社団法人全日本シーエム放送連盟 (2016). "(一社)全日本シーエム放送連盟(ACC)" [(One company) All Japan CM Broadcasting Federation (ACC)]. (一社)全日本シーエム放送連盟(ACC) (in Japanese). Archived from the original on 2016-10-02.
- Gally, Tom (1999). "Kokugo Dictionaries 国語辞書"., review article
- Yasuko, Makino (2002). "General Reference Works". Harvard University. Archived from the original on August 29, 2004.
- Matsumura, Akira (1995). Daijisen. Tōkyo: Shōgakkan. ISBN 9784095012117. OCLC 34170147.
- Matsumura, Akira, ed. (1998). 増補・新装版大辞泉 / Zōho shinsō-ban Daijisen [Augmented / New Edition Daijisen]. Shogakukan. ISBN 9784095012124. OCLC 675275597.
