= Yakuwarigo =

"Role language"; stereotyped language used in fiction

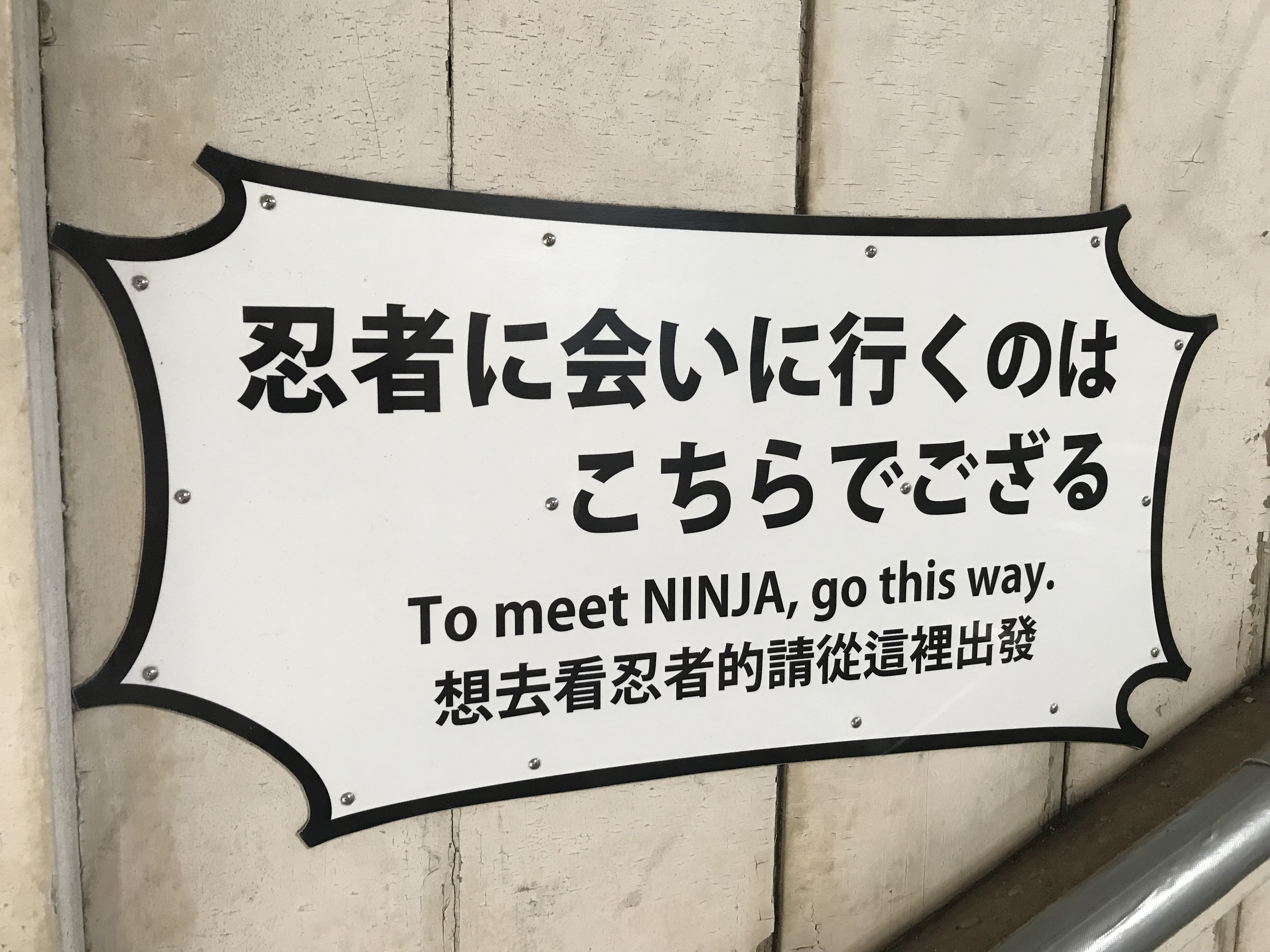
An example of yakuwarigo. ござる gozaru is a typical word that evokes ninja or samurai.

Yakuwarigo (Japanese: 役割語, "role language") is a style of language, often used in works of fiction, that conveys certain traits about its speaker such as age, gender, and class. It is particularly used in reference to the styles of speech found in Japanese-language media such as manga, anime, and novels. Although highly recognisable, it is usually partially or entirely distinct from the real life language typical of the kind of people it is used to represent. The extent and variety of yakuwarigo in Japanese can pose problems for translation, especially as it often relies on variation in features such as first person pronouns or sentence-ending particles which are static or absent in languages such as English.

The concept was first proposed by Japanese linguist Satoshi Kinsui in 2003.

== Example ==
The following sentences all have the same meaning of "Yes, I know":

- sō da yo, boku ga shitteru no sa: boy (or if spoken by a female, a tomboy)
- sō yo, atashi ga shitteru wa: girl
- sō desu wa yo, watakushi ga zonjite orimasu wa: noblewoman
- sō ja, sessha ga zonjite oru: samurai
- sō ja, washi ga shitte oru: elder doctor
- so ya, wate ga shittoru dee: Kansai dialect speaker (often associated with comedian, merchant, gangster or a non-English-speaking westerner)
- nda, ora shitteru da: country person
- sō aru yo, watashi ga shitteru aru yo: Chinese person (see Kyowa-go)
