= Shinmura Izuru Prize =

The Shinmura Izuru Prize (新村出賞) is an award presented by the Shinmura Izuru Foundation (新村出記念財団) for contributions to linguistics. The prize has been awarded since 1982 and is named after Shinmura Izuru, known for his many contributions to Japanese linguistics and lexicography.

== List of recipients ==
1. 1982
  - The Uralic Society of Japan: for their contributions in their journal Uralica vol. 5
  - Research Group for Historical Japanese Lexicology (Kokugo goishi kenkyūkai): For contributions in their publication Studies in Historical Japanese Lexicology (Kokugo goishi no kenkyū) Nos. 2 and 3.
2. 1983
  - Hōbōgirin Research Institute (Hōbōgirin Kenkyūjo): For their contribution in Hōbōgirin, an encyclopedia of Buddhism.
3. 1984
  - Harumichi Ishizuka: Zushoryō Manuscripts, Nihon Syoki: Research Part (Zushoryōbon Nihon Shoki Kenkyūhen)
  - Junichi Endō: Critical Study on Fables of Aesop I, II (Isopo Monogatari no genten teki kenkyū, Sēhen, Zokuhen)
4. 1985
  - Yukihiro Yamaguchi: Comprehensive study of a dialect in Arai, Shizuoka, Japan
  - Yoshiki Yamaguchi: On Establishment of Old Japanese Syntax and Morphology (Kodai nihongo bunpō no seiritsu no kenkyū)
5. 1986
  - Akira Minegishi: Linguistic Study of Records of Heian Period (Heian jidai kokiroku no kokugogaku teki kenkyū)
6. 1987
  - Yorio Ōtaka: Marie de France : Oeuvres complètes
  - Kazuo Takeuchi: A Turkish-Japanese Dictionary (Torukogo jiten)
  - Studies in Japanese of Kamakura era (Kamakura jidaigo kenkyū): Studies in Language of Kamakura Vol. 1-10
7. 1988
  - Konshi Fukuda: Dictionary of Literary Manchu (Manshūgo bungo jiten)
8. 1989
  - Haruo Aoki: For a transliteration and a translation of Nez Perce folklore
9. 1990
  - Dialectological Circle of Japan (Nihon hōgen kenkyūkai): The course of Study of Japanese Dialects: Festschrift for the centenary of a birth of Misao Tōjō. Study part, bibliography part. (Nihon hōgen kenkyū no ayumi: Tōjō Misao sensē sētan 100 shūnen kinen)
10. 1991
  - Kazue Akinaga: Studies on Glossed Texts in Kokin Wakashū (Kikon-wakashū sēten bon no kenkyū)
  - Kazuhiko Yoshida: The Hittite Mediopassive Endings in -ri
11. 1992
  - Yoshio Mase: History of Nagano Prefecture, "Dialect" Part (Nagano kenshi hōgenhen)
12. 1993
  - Masayoshi Matsuda, Kanichi Itoi, Kōichirō Hidaka: Changes in Environment of Dialect Use, 1955 and 1985 (Hōgen sēkatsu 30 nen no henyō)
13. 1994
  - Motoki Nakajima: Modern Kantonese Dictionary (Gendai kantongo jiten)
14. 1995
  - Kenji Sakai: A Variorum Edition of Kōyō Gunkan (Kōyō gunkan taisē)
  - Tsuguhito Takeuchi: Old Tibetan Contracts from Central Asia
15. 1996
  - Kenjirō Soeda: Issues on History of Japanese Accent (Nihongo akusento shi no sho mondai)
16. 1997
  - (no prize awarded)
17. 1998
  - Akihiko Yonekawa: Japanese-Japanese Sign Language Dictionary (Nihongo-Shuwa Jiten)
  - Masato Hachiya: Word Formational Studies of Japanese Reduplicated Words (Kokugo chōfuku go no go kōsēron teki kenkyū)
  - Fuminori Sakono: A Philological Study of Japanese Dialect (Bunken hōgen shi kenkyū)
18. 1999
  - Katsuaki Numoto: Historical Studies on Japanese Hanzi Reading: Its Structure and Written Forms (Nihon kanji on no rekishi teki kenkyū: taikē to hyōki wo megutte)
  - Kiyoshi Matsuda: Philological Study on Western Learning in Japan (Yōgaku no shoshi teki kenkyū)
19. 2000
  - Yasuko Yamaguchi: Stylistic Study of Konjaku Monogatarishū: Written Narrative (Konjaku monogatarishū no bunshō kenkyū: kakitomerareta "monogatari")
20. 2001
  - (no prize awarded)
21. 2002
  - Toshiaki Muroyama: Meaning and Yoko Society Structuring: View from Lexicons of Words of Tendency in Dialects (Yoko shakai no kōzō to imi: hōgen sēkō goi ni miru)
  - Chigusa Kobayashi: Studies of Japanese Expressions in the Middle Ages Used in the Shōmono, Kyōgen, and Christian Writings (Chūsei bunken no hyōgenron teki kenkyū)
22. 2003
  - Shigehiro Katō: A Pragmatic Study of Modification Structure in Japanese (Nihongo shūshoku kōzō no goyōron teki kenkyū)
23. 2004
  - Takashi Kobayashi: Methods of Dialectological Studies in the History of Japanese Language (Hōgengaku teki nihongo shi no hōhō)
24. 2005
  - Onore Watanabe: A Morphological Description of Sliammon, Mainland Comox Salish with a Sketch of Syntax
  - Yōko Yumoto: Meaning and Syntax of Complex Verb and Derivative Verb (Fukugō dōshi, hasē dōshi no imi to tōgo)
25. 2006
  - Shingo Yamamoto: A Stylistic Study of Hyōbyaku and Gammon of Heian and Kamakura Eras (Heian, Kamakura jidai ni okeru hyōbyaku, gwanmon no buntai no kenkyū)
  - Satoshi Kinsui: A History of Existential Expressions in Japanese (Nihongo sonzai hyōgen no rekishi)
26. 2007
  - (no prize awarded)
27. 2008
  - (no prize awarded)
28. 2009
  - Isamu Sasaki: Studies in the Kan'on of the Heian and Kamakura Eras (Heian-Kamakura-jidai ni okeru Nihon-kan'on no Kenkyū, kenkyūhen, shiryōhen)
29. 2010
  - (no prize awarded)
30. 2011
  - Kazuaki Ueno: Studies in the Early Modern Kyoto dialect Through Heikyoku Notes (Heikyoku fubon ni yoru kinsei kyōto accent no shiteki kenkyū)
  - Rika Miyai and Makiko Motoi: Kinzōron: A Text and Commentary (Kinzōron: Honbun to kenkyū)
31. 2012
  - Masato Kobayashi: Texts and Grammar of Malto
32. 2013
  - (no prize awarded)
33. 2014
  - Mayumi Kudo
34. 2015
  - (no prize awarded)
35. 2016
  - (no prize awarded)
36. 2017
  - Emiko Hayatsu: Causative Sentences in Modern Japanese
37. 2019 (平成元年度) – Hizume Shūji (肥爪周二): Study of Historical Japanese Syllable Structure.
38. 2021
  - Shinichiro Tawada for Historical Research on Verb Morphological Changes in the Okinawan Language
