= Nihongo Daijiten =

Illustrated Japanese dictionary

The Nihongo Daijiten (日本語大辞典; English title: The Great Japanese Dictionary) is a color-illustrated Japanese dictionary edited by Tadao Umesao and published by Kodansha in 1989 and 1995 (2nd edition).

== History ==
The Nihongo daijiten was one of three Japanese dictionaries specifically published to compete with Iwanami's bestselling Kōjien (1955, 1969, 1983). The others were Sanseidō's Daijirin (1988, 1995, 2006) and Shogakukan's Daijisen (1995, 1998). These four general-purpose kokugo jisho (国語辞書 "Japanese language dictionaries") are bulky reference works that weigh approximately 1 kilogram.

Along with the chief editor Umesao Tadao, other Nihongo daijiten editors included Kindaichi Haruhiko (金田一春彦, 1913–2004), Sakakura Atsuyoshi (阪倉篤義, 1917–1994), and Hinohara Shigeaki (日野原重明, 1911- ).

Kodansha's first Color-edition Nihongo daijiten (1989) included over 175,000 headword entries. This dictionary also incorporated encyclopedic content such as color pictures, proper names, allegedly "10,000" kanji entries (many with Japanese input method JIS X 0208 codes), and some 100,000 English translation glosses for modern Japanese words.

The 2nd edition (1995) expanded by almost 250 pages, giving 200,000 headwords, 120,000 English glosses, and 6500 color illustrations. The printed Nihongo daijiten version came with an electronic book CD-ROM containing some additional digital content (graphic data, sound files, etc.). In 2001, Sony licensed Kodansha's Nihongo daijiten and released a Japanese TVware version for PlayStation 2.

== Characteristics ==
English glosses are one of the most notable differences between the Nihongo daijiten and other general-purpose Japanese dictionaries (Kōjien, Daijirin, Daijisen, etc.). Since the Nihongo daijiten gives brief English annotations rather than translation equivalents, it is not an actual Japanese-English bilingual dictionary, but it is useful as an all-in-one dictionary. Most monolingual Japanese dictionaries only include English words as loanword sources, for instance, noting tie as the origin of Japanese tai (タイ "tie, necktie; tie, equal score"). In distinction, the Nihongo daijiten entry for tai (鯛 "sea bream; porgy") gives three English glosses.

- porgy, under the fish name
- supreme thing, under the "highest quality" metaphor, specifically the idiom kusatte mo tai (腐っても鯛 "Even if it's rotting, sea bream [is the best]")
- Better to be the head of a dog than the tail of a lion, under the subentry for tai no o yorimo iwashi no kashira (鯛の尾よりも鰯の頭 "Better to be the head of a sardine than the tail of a sea bream").

English is also prominent on the Nihongo daijiten cover with a stylized "GJ" monogram and "The Great Japanese Dictionary" title.

While the venerable Kōjien dictionary only had black-and-white illustrations, the three competitors took advantage of color printing technology. For instance, all included appendices showing Japanese color names and corresponding colors. First, the Nihongo Daijiten (1989) appendix printed 350 colors and names (色名辞典 "Dictionary of color names", with notes and page cross-references). Second, the Daijisen (1995) appendix had 358 (カラーチャート色名 "Color chart of color names"). The 1st edition Daijirin (1988) was printed in two colors, and the 2nd edition (1995) added a color appendix displaying 168 (色の名 "Names of colors", some with Classical Japanese quotations).

== Reviews ==
The Japanese translator Tom Gally (1999) criticizes the Nihongo Daijiten in comparison with the Kōjien, Daijirin, and Daijisen.

Though subtitled in English "The Great Japanese Dictionary," this dictionary is, in my opinion, the least great of the four large single-volume kokugo dictionaries described here. With its many color pictures, pages of advice on giving speeches and writing letters, and short English glosses for many of the entries, it wears its marketing strategy on its sleeve: to sell to people who don't know dictionaries. While all of the big dictionaries are advertised as gifts for recent graduates and newlyweds, this one seems most consciously designed to appeal to the casual, unintellectual consumer. Nihongo Daijiten's definitions in Japanese are noticeably shorter than in Daijirin, Daijisen, or Koujien, and, despite being as large and heavy as the others, Nihongo Daijiten has significantly fewer entries and pages, the thicker paper and larger pictures having taken their toll. Even the English glosses, though quite well done, are too skimpy to make this book much use as a Japanese–English dictionary. The one area where this dictionary excels is in its pictures. They are clear and attractive, and they make the book a pleasure for casual browsing. They appear, though, at a heavy price to what I, for one, want most in a dictionary: words.

The Japanese librarian Yasuko Makino describes the Nihongo daijiten.

An encyclopedic, one-volume modern Japanese–language dictionary, aiming to give a total picture of the language. Focusing on words which are used everyday, this revised edition contains 200,000 words, terms and phrases, and names which we encounter and use daily including proper names particularly personal and geographical names both domestic and foreign, idioms, foreign words which became Japanese, acronyms, and 6,500 color illustrations. Includes sample sentences employing the words. It added elements of Kanwa jiten [Chinese character–Japanese dictionary], and includes many compounds as separate entries. When English equivalents exist, it is given. Includes various useful appendixes such as sample letters, speeches, and abbreviated words.
