= IFinger =

iFinger Ltd (NUF) is a Norwegian producer of digital dictionaries founded in 2000. iFinger works by partnering with international publishers such as Oxford University Press, Ernst Klett Verlag, Cappelen Forlag and other respected publishing houses in order to provide their content digitally.

== Technology ==
The iFinger software is based on the LinguistX modules from Inxight Software Inc.

The iFinger search engine works by appearing on the user's screen and delivering results in a drop-down window. It uses an internal browser to present the HTML formatted content. Inxight’s LinguistX modules are used for linguistic analysis of the input.
