= Daijirin =

Japanese dictionary

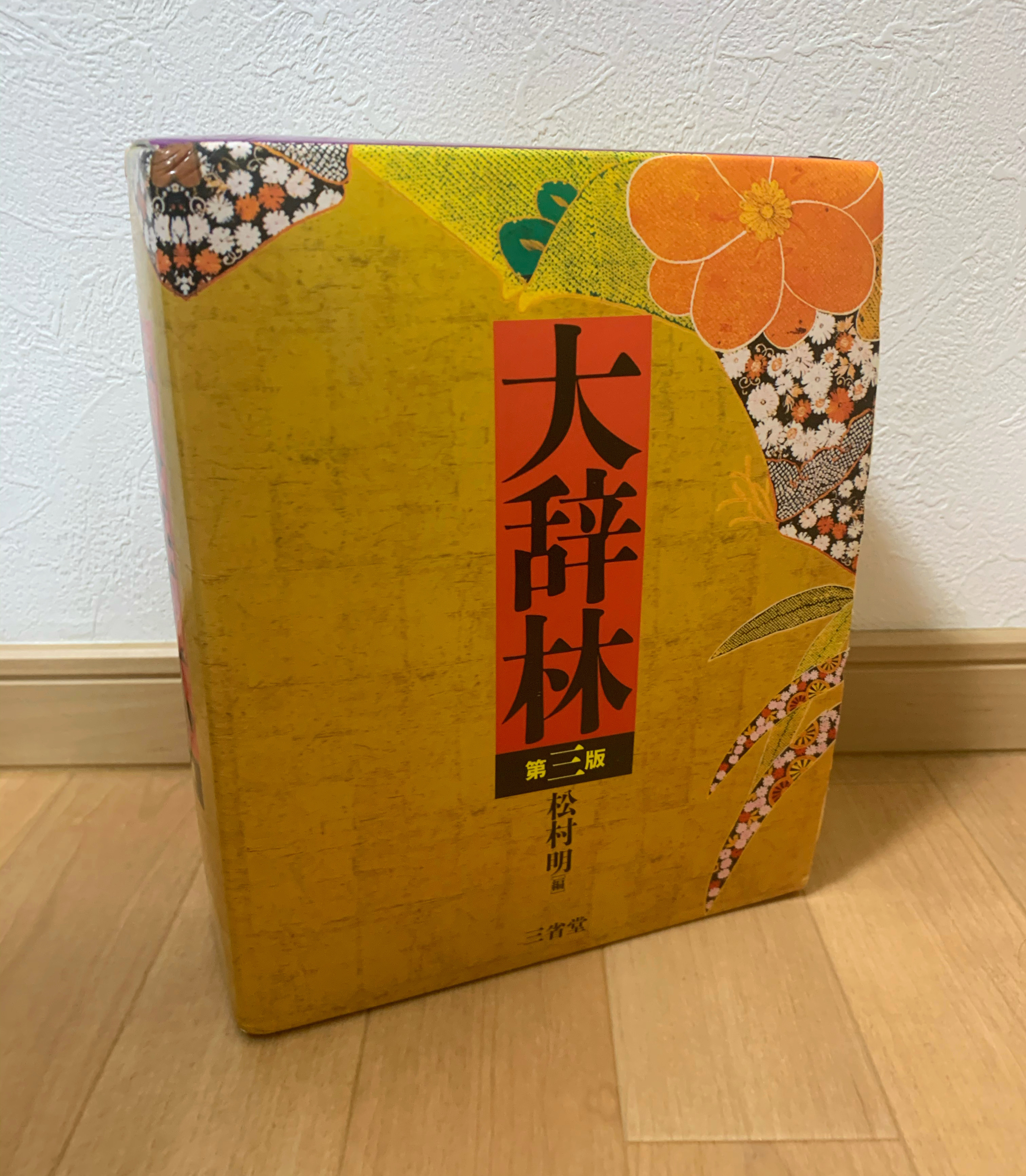
Daijirin Third Edition

Daijirin (Japanese: 大辞林; lit. 'Great Forest of Words') is a comprehensive single-volume Japanese dictionary edited by Akira Matsumura (松村明; Matsumura Akira, 1916–2001), and first published by Sanseido Books (三省堂書店; Sanseidō Shoten) in 1988. This title is based upon two early Sanseidō dictionaries edited by Shōzaburō Kanazawa (金沢庄三郎, 1872–1967), Jirin (辞林 "Forest of words", 1907) and the revised Kōjirin (広辞林 "Wide forest of words", 1925).

== History ==
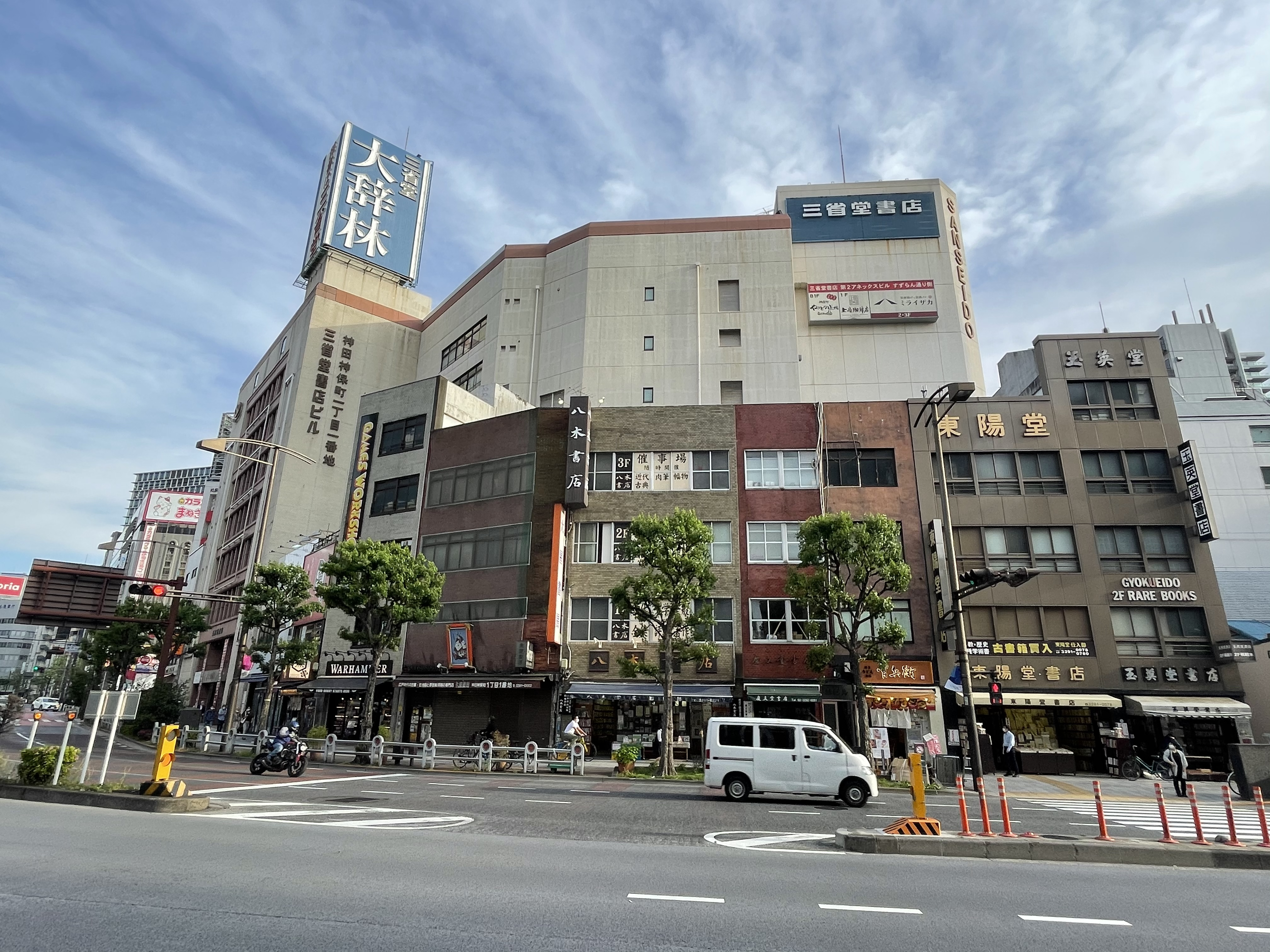
A Sanseidō bookstore in Jinbōchō, Tokyo (2021). An advertisement for Daijirin can be seen

Sanseido specifically created Daijirin to compete with Iwanami's profitable Kōjien dictionary, which was a longtime bestseller through three editions (1955, 1969, and 1983). Two other contemporary dictionaries directed at the Kōjien market share were Kōdansha's color-illustrated Nihongo Daijiten (日本語大辞典 "Great dictionary of Japanese", 1989) and Shōgakukan's Daijisen (大辞泉 "Great fountainhead of words", 1995, also edited by Akira Matsumura).

The first edition of Daijirin (1988) had 220,000 headword entries and included encyclopedic content in numerous charts, tables, and illustrations. While Kōjien was printed in black and white, Sanseido included 19 two-color illustrations for topics like the seasons (with kigo), linguistics (synonymy), and Japanese language (Man'yōgana). According to Matsumura's preface, the process of editing the first edition took over 28 years.

The second edition (1995) increased the number of entries to 233,000 and augmented the number of illustrations (including 31 pages of full-color maps and charts). Sanseido published the second edition in printed, CD-ROM, e-book, and Web versions. They additionally bundled the so-called "Super" version Sūpā Daijirin (スーパー大辞林) CD-ROM with other Sanseido Japanese and English dictionaries, plus pronunciation sound files. In 1997, Sanseido published a reverse dictionary of the second edition, entitled Kanji-biki, Gyaku-biki Daijirin (漢字引き・逆引き大辞林, ISBN 4-385-13901-6), with two indexes. The first lists kanji by on-yomi and stroke count, the second indexes headwords both by first and last kanji (for example, it lists jisho 辞書 "wordbook; dictionary" under both ji 辞 "word" and sho 書 "book"). According to Sanseido, total sales of the first two editions totaled over one million copies in 2003.

The third edition (2006) added new headwords, such as the English loanword intarakutibu (インタラクティブ "interactive"), for a total of 238,000 entries. Japanese dictionary publishers have an ongoing dilemma, the increasing popularity of Internet and electronic dictionaries is decreasing the sales of printed ones. Kono (2007) notes, "According to Jiten Kyokai, an association of dictionary publishers, total annual sales of printed dictionaries, including popular Japanese and English, and specialized ones, such as technical dictionaries, halved to 6.5 million copies in the past decade." To promote the third edition, Sanseido launched a novel "Dual" service, the Dyuaru Daijirin (デュアル大辞林), allowing purchasers of the printed version to register for free online dictionary access. The online version is being regularly updated (currently including over 248,000 entries) and allows keyword searching for synonyms and related expressions. In 2006, collective Daijirin sales exceeded 1.5 million copies.

Daijirin is also available on the Internet. Sanseido's Web Dictionary offers Web and mobile phone subscription access to numerous dictionaries, including E-jirin (e辞林). Nippon Telegraph and Telephone's "Goo Lab" provided a server that allowed free online searching of the second edition Sūpā Daijirin, but the service was shut down in mid 2025. Yahoo also used to provide access to the second edition of the dictionary, but the service has since been discontinued.

== Editions ==
=== Japanese dictionaries ===
- Daijirin
  - 1st edition (ISBN 4-385-14001-4) (1988-11-03)
  - 2nd edition (ISBN 4-385-13900-8) (1995-11-03)
  - 3rd edition (ISBN 4-385-13905-9) (大辞林 第三版) (2006-10-27): Includes 238,000 entries.
  - 4th edition (ISBN 4-385-13906-7) (2019-09-05)
- Dual Daijirin [Web edition] (Dual 大辞林［Web版］): It is a web browser-based version of Daijirin 3rd edition.

=== Japanese-Chinese dictionaries ===
- Shuangjierihancilin (雙解日漢辭林) (ISBN 978-957-11-4904-2, 1A88): Published by Wu-Nan Culture Enterprise(Wu-Nan Book Inc.), based on the Sanseido's Jirin 21 which is based on first edition of Daijirin. Includes 150,000 entries.
  - 1st impression (2007-11-01)
- Xinrihancilin (新日漢辭林) (ISBN 978-957-11-6084-9, 1A89): Published by Wu-Nan Culture Enterprise(Wu-Nan Book Inc.), based on the Daijirin 2nd edition. Includes 170,000 entries.
  - 1st impression (2010-10-01)

== Comparison with Kōjien ==
One of the biggest differences between Daijirin and Kōjien definitions is how they arrange meanings. A dictionary can arrange entries either historically with the oldest recorded meanings first (e.g., Kōjien and Oxford English Dictionary) or popularly with the most common meanings first (e.g., Daijirin and American Heritage Dictionary).

Daijirin entries encompass diverse vocabulary, including modern and classical Japanese words, scientific terminology, proper names, alphabetical abbreviations (like NG "no good; outtake, blooper"), and yojijukugo idioms. Some definitions include semantic notes distinguishing homonyms and synonyms. Daijirin usage examples range from classical texts like Man'yōshū to modern publications.

Tom Gally lists three advantages of Daijirin,

Though Koujien is regarded by many in Japan as the authoritative dictionary and is the one most often cited by newspaper editorialists trying to make etymological points of questionable validity, I regard the best single-volume kokugo [Japanese language] dictionary to be Daijirin. Designed to compete directly with Koujien, Daijirin is different in one key way from its illustrious predecessor: whereas Koujien arranges the senses of its definitions in historical order, Daijirin puts the most common contemporary meanings first. The result, for a person reading modern Japanese, is that Daijirin is the most likely to list the intended meaning where it can be found easily.

The other two Daijirin advantages are semantically "more detailed" definitions and the "unusual, though not unprecedented" kanji and reverse-dictionary index.

Baroni and Bialock describe Daijirin,

This is the most up-to-date and attractive of the large single-volume kokugo jiten. In this sense, it may overlap or even supersede Kōjien in neologism and gairaigo. It also features illustrations and historical references, charts, and explanations of historic or complicated terms. It is visually easier to use, with gojuon headings clearly boxed off, and uses larger headings for more significant entries.

Faris writes,

In general the definitions in the Daijirin are fairly easy to read, while in many cases a non-native of Japanese would have more trouble reading Kōjien definitions, which often contain words more difficult than the one they are defining. There are also many cases where the Daijirin is simply more complete, and contains usage or definitions not given in the Kōjien.

He compares the definitions for abarenbō (暴れん坊), literally meaning "rambunctious kid, wild child; bundle of energy" and figuratively meaning abaremono (暴れ者) "rowdy; hooligan; tough; maverick".

- Kōjien: 思うままに振舞う人。あばれもの。"A person who behaves however he wants. A violent person."
- Daijirin: 1. けんかやいたずらをする活発な子供。2. 周囲を気にせず強引な行動をする人。"1. An energetic child that gets into fights and causes mischief. 2. A person who behaves forcefully without regard for people around him."

Faris concludes that since, "The most popular use of this word is with regard to overactive children, so the Daijirin wins in this case."
