= Kōjien =

Japanese dictionary

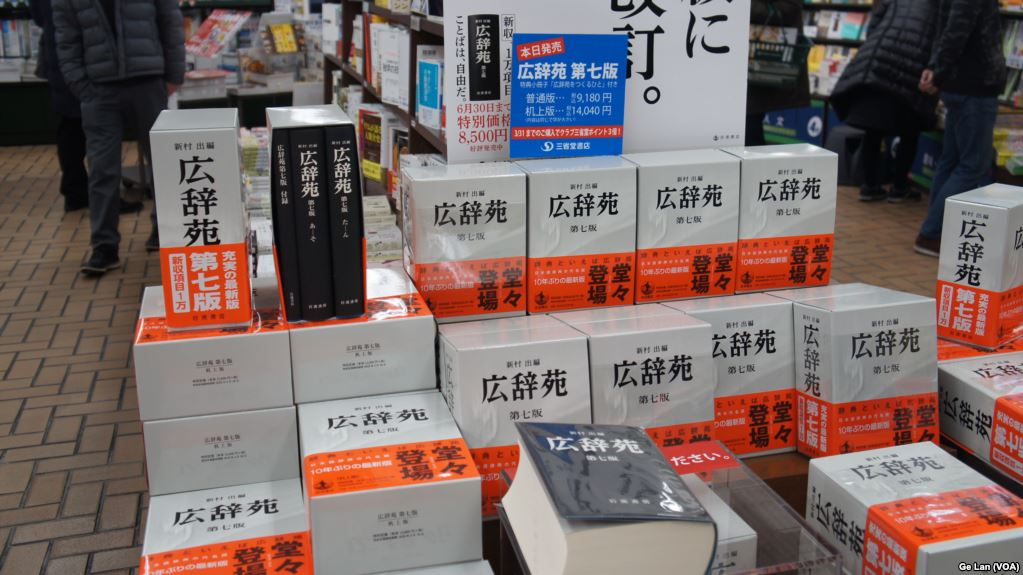
Kōjien 7th edition (2018) displayed at a bookstore in Tokyo

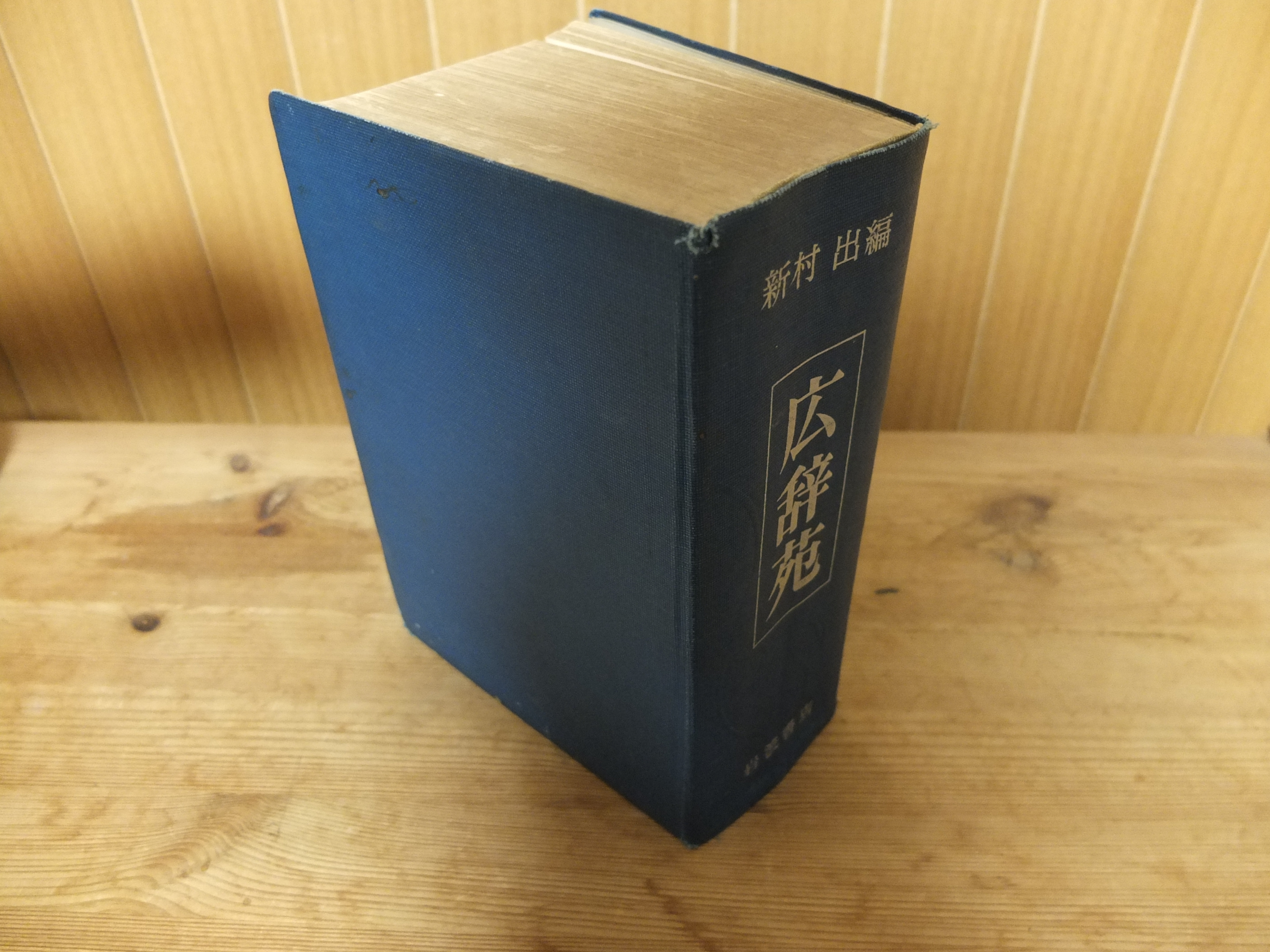
Kōjien 2nd edition (1969)

Kōjien (Japanese: 広辞苑; lit. "Wide garden of words") is a single-volume Japanese dictionary first published by Iwanami Shoten in 1955. It is widely regarded as the most authoritative dictionary of Japanese, and newspaper editorials frequently cite its definitions. As of 2007, it had sold 11 million copies.

== Izuru Shinmura ==
Kōjien was the magnum opus of Shinmura Izuru, 1876–1967, a professor of linguistics and Japanese at Kyoto University. He was born in Yamaguchi Prefecture and graduated from the Tokyo University, where he was a student of Kazutoshi Ueda (上田万年; Ueda Kazutoshi, 1867–1937). After studying in Germany, Ueda taught comparative linguistics and edited foreign-language dictionaries in the latter part of the Meiji era. Through his tutelage, Shinmura became involved in Japanese language lexicography. Even Kōjien editions published after his death credit Shinmura as the chief editor.

== History ==
=== Jien ===
The predecessor of Kōjien originated during the Great Depression in East Asia. In 1930, the publisher Shigeo Oka (岡茂雄, Oka Shigeo, 1894–1989) wanted to create a Japanese dictionary for high school students. He asked his friend Shinmura to be chief editor, and they chose the title Jien (辞苑 "Garden of words") in a classical allusion to the Ziyuan (字苑, "Garden of characters") Chinese dictionary. Shinmura appointed his son Takeshi Shinmura (新村猛, Shinmura Takeshi, 1905–1992) as an editor, and in 1935, Hakubunkan (博文館) published the Jien dictionary. It contained some 160,000 headword entries of old and new Japanese vocabulary, as well as encyclopedic content, and quickly became a bestseller.

=== 1st edition ===
The editors began working on a revised edition, but the 1945 Firebombing of Tokyo destroyed their work. After the war, Shinmura and his lexicographers began anew in September 1948. Iwanami Shoten published the first Kōjien in 1955. It included approximately 200,000 headwords, about 40,000 more than the Jien.

=== 2nd edition ===
The 2nd edition (1969) deleted about 20,000 old entries and added about 20,000 new ones, especially scientific terms.

On December 1, 1976, a revised and expanded version (補訂版, hoteiban) of the 2nd edition was published.

=== 3rd edition ===
The 3rd edition (1983) added 12,000 entries, and was published in CD-ROM format in 1987.

=== 4th edition ===
Three major Japanese publishers released new dictionaries specifically designed to compete with the Iwanami's popular and profitable Kōjien: Sanseidō's Daijirin (大辞林 "Great forest of words", 1988), Shōgakukan's Daijisen (大辞泉 "Great fountainhead of words", 1995), and Kōdansha's Nihongo Daijiten (日本語大辞典 "Great dictionary of Japanese" 1989). In response, the 4th edition Kōjien (1991) was a major revision that added some 15,000 entry words, bringing the total to over 220,000. The CD-ROM version was published in 1993 and revised with color illustrations (like the Nihongo daijiten) in 1996.

In 1992, Iwanami published both an e-book format 4th edition and a useful Gyakubiki Kōjien (逆引き広辞苑 "Reverse dictionary Kōjien").

=== 5th edition ===
The 5th edition (1998) includes over 230,000 headwords, and its 2996 pages contain an estimated total of 14 million characters. Iwanami Shoten currently publishes Kōjien in several printed and digital formats, and also sells dictionary subscription services for cell phone and Internet access. Various manufacturers of Japanese electronic dictionaries have licensed the digital Kōjien, and it is the core dictionary in many models.

Shinmura's preface to the 1st edition stated his hope that the Kōjien would become regarded as the standard by which other dictionaries would be measured. This has largely been fulfilled; many people regard the Kōjien as the most authoritative Japanese language dictionary on the market. It remains a bestseller in Japan. According to Iwanami, the 1st edition Kōjien sold over one million copies, and the 5th edition brought cumulative total sales to over eleven million in 2000.

=== 6th edition ===
The sixth edition was released on January 11, 2008, includes more than 10,000 new entries, bringing the total to approximately 240,000. It also contains an additional 1,500 quotations.

The 6th edition refers to Taiwan as a province of the People's Republic of China. Before the release of the 7th edition, Taipei Economic and Cultural Representative Office in Japan issued an official statement, requesting Iwanami Shoten to correct the entry. Iwanami Shoten, however, defended the entry as correct because Japan officially recognised One China based on the Japan–China Joint Communiqué, that "fully understands and respects Taiwan is part of the PRC", and the current relationship between Japan and Taiwan is non governmental. Taipei Economic and Cultural Representative Office in Japan expressed regret for the defence.

=== 7th edition ===
The seventh edition was released on January 12, 2018. Changes include 10,000 new words were added from 100,000 words collected by its editors firstly, including "apuri"(app), "Isuramu-koku"(Islamic State), LGBT, "hanii torappu" (honey trap), "jidori" (selfie) and "diipu raningu" (deep learning). Other changes include citing available source literature for a given explanation of a term, listing changes of the usages of a term, addition of 140 pages without adding book thickness.

However, the definition of LGBT in the edition was written as "individuals whose sexual orientation differs from the majority." Some criticized that the definition only describes the "LGB" portion of the acronym which refers to sexual orientation, while the "T" refers to gender identity. In response, the publisher revised the definition to "in broad terms, people whose sexual orientations are not heterosexual or people whose gender identity does not match the sex they were identified with at birth.”

== Publication ==
=== Japanese dictionaries ===
==== By Iwanami Shoten ====
- Jien (辞苑)
  - ?th printing (1935-??-??)
- Kōjien 1st edition (広辞苑)
  - ?th printing (1955-05-25)
- Kōjien 2nd edition (広辞苑 第二版) (ASIN B00GD6NHXM)
  - ?th printing (1969-05-16)
- Kōjien 2nd revised edition (広辞苑 第二版補訂版)
  - ?th printing (1976-12-01)
- Kōjien 3rd edition (広辞苑 第三版) (ISBN 978-4-00-080001-3):
  - ?th printing (1983-12-06)
- Kōjien 4th edition: Includes 220,000 entries, 2500 illustrations.
  - regular edition (広辞苑 第四版 普通版) (ISBN 4-00-080101-5 C0500/ISBN 978-4-00-080101-0):
    - ?th printing (1991-11-15)
  - desktop edition (広辞苑 第四版 机上版) (ISBN 4-00-080102-3 C0500/ISBN 978-4-00-080102-7): B5 page size.
    - ?th printing (1991-11-15)
  - reverse index regular edition (逆引き広辞苑 普通版) (ISBN 978-4-00-080106-5)
    - ?th printing (1992-11-17)
  - reverse index desktop edition (逆引き広辞苑 机上版) (ISBN 978-4-00-080107-2): B5 page size.
    - ?th printing (1992-11-17)
  - leather edition (広辞苑 第四版 総革装) (ISBN 4-00-080103-1 C0500/ISBN 978-4-00-080103-4): Regular page size in leather cover.
    - ?th printing (1992-11-17)
  - EPWING CD-ROM edition (広辞苑 第四版 CD‐ROM版 EPWING規約準拠) (ISBN 978-4-00-130015-4): CD-ROM includes 84 bird sounds, 234 colour samples, search engine.
    - ?th printing (1993-03-01)
  - Electronic Kōjien 4th edition (電子広辞苑 第四版) (ISBN 978-4-00-130017-8): Sold by NEC Home Electronics. Includes CD‐ROM dictionary, search software in 3.5 and 5.25-inch floppies. Supports PC‐9800 series MS-DOS CD‐ROM Extensions Ver. 2．0 and Japanese MS‐DOS 3.1.
    - ?th printing (1993-03-20)
  - Macintosh edition (マック広辞苑) (ISBN 978-4-00-130020-8): Sold by Qualitas Japan. CD‐ROM includes index software, KanjiTalk 7.1 compatibility.
    - ?th printing (1994-07-01)
  - EPWING V2 CD-ROM edition (広辞苑 第四版 CD‐ROM（カラー）版 EPWING規約（第2版）準拠) (ISBN 978-4-00-130030-7): CD-ROM includes 84 bird sounds, 234 colour samples, 650 new colour photos, search engine.
    - ?th printing (1995-11-15)
  - CD-ROM colour edition (広辞苑 第四版 CD-ROM（カラー）版 「こととい」パック) (ISBN 978-4-00-200971-1): Includes Windows/Mac OS CD-ROM.
    - ?th printing (1996-01-25)
  - e-book edition (電子ブック 広辞苑 第四版 電子ブック（補訂）版) (ISBN 4-00-130035-4 C0800/ISBN 978-4-00-130035-2): Includes CD-ROM. CD-ROM includes 40 bird sounds, keyword search engine.
    - ?th printing (1996-01-25/1996-12-16)
  - EPWING V3 CD-ROM multimedia edition (広辞苑 CD－ROM マルチメディア版 EPWING規約第3版準拠) (ISBN 4-00-130051-6 C0800/ISBN 978-4-00-130051-2): Includes CD-ROM. CD-ROM includes 1800 colour illustrations, 15 animations, 84 bird sounds, 234 colour samples, 542 literature information.
    - ?th printing (1996-12-16)
  - EPWING V3 CD-ROM multimedia edition (広辞苑 第四版 CD－ROM（マルチメディア）版検索ソフト（「ことといV2」）付 EPWING規約（第3版）準拠) (ISBN 4-00-200972-6 C0800/ISBN 978-4-00-200972-8): Includes 2 CD-ROM. CD-ROM includes 1800 colour illustrations, 15 animations, 84 bird sounds, 234 colour samples, 542 literature information, Kototoi Ver.2 index software.
    - ?th printing (1996-12-16)
- Kōjien 5th edition: Includes 230,000 entries.
  - regular edition (広辞苑 第五版) (ISBN 4-00-080111-2 C0500/ISBN 978-4-00-080111-9)
    - ?th printing (1998-11-11)
  - desktop edition (広辞苑 第五版) (ISBN 978-4-00-080112-6): B5 page size.
    - ?th printing (1998-11-11)
  - EPWING V5 CD-ROM edition (広辞苑 第五版 CD－ROM版 EPWING規約（第5版）準拠) (ISBN 4-00-130072-9 C0800/ISBN 978-4-00-130072-7): Includes CD-ROM. CD-ROM supports Windows 95-XP, KanjiTalk 7.5 with MacOS 9.2.2.
    - ?th printing (1998-11-11)
  - e-book edition (電子ブック 広辞苑 第五版 電子ブック版) (ISBN 4-00-130074-5 C0800/ISBN 978-4-00-130074-1): Includes mini CD-ROM. Supports EBXA, S-EBXA-compatible electronic dictionary readers.
    - ?th printing (1999-04-26)
  - reverse index (逆引き広辞苑 第五版対応) (ISBN 978-4-00-080116-4)
    - ?th printing (1999-10-15)
  - goat leather edition (広辞苑 第五版 総革装) (ISBN 978-4-00-080113-3)
    - ?th printing (1999-10-15)
  - iMode edition: It is a monthly subscription service.
    - Version ? (2001-04-??)
    - Version ? (2003-02-??, with poetry collection (折々のうた365日))
  - EZweb edition: It is a monthly subscription service.
    - Version ? (2003-06-??)
  - J-Sky edition: It is a monthly subscription service.
- Kōjien 6th edition: Includes 240,000 entries, 2800 illustrations.
  - regular edition (広辞苑 第六版) (ISBN 978-4-00-080121-8): 2 volumes (1+1 index).
    - ?th printing (2008-01-11)
  - desktop edition (広辞苑 第六版) (ISBN 978-4-00-080122-5): B5 page size. 3 volumes (2+1 index).
    - ?th printing (2008-01-11)
  - EPWING V5 DVD-ROM edition (広辞苑 第六版 DVD－ROM版) (ISBN 978-4-00-130161-8): B5 page size. Includes Windows Vista/MacOS X 10.3 DVD-ROM. DVD-ROM includes Kototoi Light Ver3.5. Windows Vista support requires an updated Kototoi installer.
    - ?th printing (2008-01-11)
  - goat leather edition (広辞苑 第六版 総革装) (ISBN 978-4-00-080123-2)
    - ?th printing (2009-01-20)
  - goat leather desktop edition (広辞苑 第六版 総革装 机上版) (ISBN 978-4-00-080124-9): B5 page size.
    - ?th printing (2009-01-20)
  - Mobile edition: It is a monthly subscription service.
  - Iwanami library 225 Kōjien wo 3 bai tanoshimu (岩波科学ライブラリー 225 広辞苑を3倍楽しむ) (ISBN 4-00-029625-6/ISBN 978-4-00-029625-0): An essay on science of authors active in various fields.
    - ?th printing (2014-04-25)
- Kōjien 7th edition: Includes 10,000 new entries for total 250,000 entries. Dictionary book covers can also be personalized by the publisher.
  - Preorder edition: Includes production booklet (広辞苑をつくるひと).
    - 1st printing (2017-11-03)
  - Regular edition (広辞苑 第七版(普通版)) (ISBN 978-4-00-080131-7): 1+1(index) volumes.
    - 1st printing (2018-01-12)
  - Desktop edition (広辞苑 第七版(机上版)) (ISBN 978-4-00-080132-4): B5 page size. 2+1(index) volumes.
    - 1st printing (2018-01-12)
  - 7th edition errata
    - 1st printing (2018-01-25): Corrected 2 dictionary entries of the 1st printing of the dictionary (LGBT, Shimanami Kaidou).

==== By Shanghai Foreign Language Education Press ====
- Kōjien 5th edition:
  - regular edition (广辞苑 第五版) (ISBN 7-81-095442-3)
    - ?th printing (2006-10-01)
- Kōjien 6th edition:
  - regular edition (广辞苑 第六版) (ISBN 978-7-5446-2109-0)
    - ?th printing (2012-05-??)

==== Electronic edition by Casio ====
- Kōjien 7th edition:
  - Casio EX-word electronic dictionary editions:
    - XD-Z4800, XD-Z6500, XD-Z8500 (2018-01-19)
    - XD-Z20000 (2018-02-09)
    - XD-C400 (2018-07-11)
    - XD-SR6500 (2019-01-25)
    - XD-SR20000 (2019-02-08)
    - XD-SX6500 (2020-01-24)

==== Electronic edition by Keisokugiken corporation ====
- Kōjien 6th edition: Based on 6th edition DVD-ROM version. Includes 7700 illustrations and graphs, 160 animations, 231 voice samples, 100 charts.
  - iOS 2-3 edition
    - Version 1.0.1 (2009-04-24)
    - Version 1.0.2 (2009-06-25): Official iOS 3.0 support.
    - Version 1.0.3 (2009-07-17)
    - Version 2.0 (2010-04-16)
  - iOS 2-4 edition
    - Version 2.0.3 (2010-07-07)
  - iOS 3-4.x edition
    - Version 2.2.2 (2011-03-24)
    - Version 2.2.3 (2011-06-01)
  - iOS 3-5.x edition
    - Version 2.3 (2011-09-22)
    - Version 2.3.1 (2011-10-26)
    - Version 2.3.4 (2012-03-14)
  - iOS 4.2-6.0 edition
    - Version 2.3.8 (2012-10-25)
    - Version 2.3.9 (2012-11-19)
  - iOS 5.0-7 edition
    - Version 2.5 (2013-11-29)
    - Version 2.5.1 (2014-02-07)
    - Version 2.6 (2014-07-29)
  - iOS 5.0-8 edition
    - Version 2.6.2 (2014-10-06)
    - Version 2.6.4 (2015-05-18)
  - iOS 6.0-8, 32/64-bit edition
    - Version 2.7 (2015-09-14)
    - Version 2.7.2 (2015-11-17)
  - iOS 7 and above edition
    - Version 2.8 (2016-04-22)
    - Version 2.8.3 (2017-04-07)
  - iOS 7-11 edition (広辞苑第六版 for iOS) (WWANN001A)
    - Version 2.8.5 (2017-10-13)
    - Version 2.8.6 (2017-10-24)
- Kōjien 6th edition (7th migration edition):
  - iOS 7-11 edition (広辞苑第六版〔第七版移行版〕): Automatically updated to 7th edition in 2017-01-08.
    - Version 2.8.5 (2017-10-25 - 2018-01-12)
- Kōjien 7th edition:
  - iOS 8-11 edition (広辞苑第七版 for iOS) (WWANN002A): It is an automatic upgrade from 6th edition (7th migration edition). Includes 4500 photographs, 2800 graphs, 100 charts. Voice sample was not included.
    - Version 2.9 (2018-01-12)
    - Version 2.9.1 (2018-01-29)

==== Electronic edition by LogoVista Corporation ====
- Kōjien 7th edition:
  - Android 4-8 edition (広辞苑 第七版)
    - Version 1.0? (2018-01-22)
    - Version 1.1 (2018-01-29)
    - Version 1.2 (2018-01-30, Android 4.0.3)
    - Version 1.4 (LogoVista dictionary browser Ver.2)
    - Version 1.5 (2019-06-06): Android 9-10.0 support.
  - iOS 9 edition (広辞苑 第七版): Uses Shuei Mincho font by Morisawa Inc. Contents are delivered via LogoVista dictionary browser.
    - Version ? (2018-01-12?)
    - Version 1.0.1 (LogoVista dictionary browser) (2018-03-07)
    - Version 1.0.2 (LogoVista dictionary browser) (2018-04-25): Dictionary text update (from errata 1?).
    - Version 1.0.5 (LogoVista dictionary browser) (2019-01-27)
    - Version 2.0 (LogoVista dictionary browser) (2019-02-11)
    - Version 2.0.8 (LogoVista dictionary browser) (2019-07-23): Dictionary contents update.
  - Windows/Mac OS edition: Mac OS version supports Mac OS 10.9-10.13 for Intel Mac, Microsoft Office 2011. Windows version supports Windows 7-10, Internet Explorer 11, Microsoft Office 2007-2016, Ichitaro 2013-2017, .NET Framework 4 for Microsoft Office plugin. Uses LogoVista electronic dictionary browser.
    - Windows/Mac OS DVD box edition (広辞苑 第七版) (ISBN 494802251192-9)
      - Version ? (2018-01-12)
    - Windows download version (広辞苑 第七版 for Win)
      - Version 1? (2018-01-12)
      - Version 3 (2018-01-29)
      - Version 4 (2018-02-08)
    - MacOS download version (広辞苑 第七版 for Mac)
      - Version 1.0 (2018-01-11)
      - Version 1.0.1 (2018-01-29): Includes the errata update from the print edition.
      - Version 1.1 (2018-07-27): Dictionary contents update.
      - Version 1.1.1 (2019-03-10): Partial image size fix.
      - Version 1.2 (2019-05-29, Mac OS X 10.11 64-bit): Dictionary contents update.

==== Electronic edition by So-net Entertainment Corporation ====
- Kōjien 5th edition:
  - Demo edition: Only limited search options are available.
  - Official version: It is a monthly subscription service.

=== Japanese-Korean dictionaries ===
==== By Amhbook/Amunhaksa ====
- Kōjien 6th edition (Kojien, 6th edition JAPANESE-KOREAN DICTIONARY/広辞苑 第六版 日韓辞典/고지엔 제6판 일한사전 전2권) (ISBN 978-89-6184-277-8): B5 pages. 2 volumes.
  - 1st printing (2012-11-09)

==== By DaolSoft, Co., Ltd. ====
- Kōjien 6th edition
  - Android version (広辞苑 第六版 日韓辞典 (고지엔 일한사전))
    - Version 1.0.3
    - Version 1.1.0
    - Version 1.1.2
    - Version 1.1.3
    - Version 1.1.4
    - Version 1.1.5 (2017-01-16, Android 2.2)
  - iOS version (広辞苑 第六版 日韓辞典 (고지엔 일한사전))
    - Version 1.0 (2012-11-29)
    - Version 1.1 (2013-02-06, iOS 5.1 or later)
    - Version 1.2 (2014-10-07, iOS 5.1.1 or later)
    - Version 1.3 (2018-10-26, iOS 8.0 or later)
    - Version 1.3.1 (2019-07-07)

== Lexicographical characteristics ==
The Kōjien, like most Japanese dictionaries, writes headwords in hiragana syllabary and collates them in gojūon ("50 sounds") order. Baroni and Bialock (2005) describe the Kōjien as "an old standard that gives extensive definitions, etymologies (as always take care with these), and variant usages for words, places, historical and literary figures, and furigana for difficult or old terms."

This dictionary is notable for including current Japanese catchphrases and buzzwords. For instance, the 4th edition added furītā (フリーター "a part-time worker by choice"), which blends two loanwords: furī (フリー "free", from English, as in furīransu フリーランス "freelance") and arubaitā (アルバイター "part-time worker", from German Arbeiter "worker").

The Kōjien dictionary had a censorship policy before it became politically correct (see kotobagari), and omitted taboo words such as sexual slang or offensive terms. It includes encyclopedic information such as 2700 illustrations and maps, and mini-biographies of notable people (both living and dead foreigners, but only deceased Japanese). The appendices include Japanese grammar notes, kanji with difficult readings, Japanese calendar and Gregorian calendar charts, and lists of gairaigo acronyms.

Gally (1999) says, "Koujien is a fine dictionary with a sterling reputation. Because it gives definitions in historical order, it is the best single-volume choice for people interested in how the meanings of words have changed over time." However, he notes, "In my experience as a translator of contemporary Japanese, though, I have found Koujien less useful than Daijirin." This criticism is based on his use of the fourth edition, though, and he concedes that later editions seem to have improved in this regard.

== Kojien University ==
As part of the publication of Kojien 7th edition, Kojien University (広辞苑大学) seminars were held in 2018-01-12 and 2018-01-14. Second round of the seminars were planned in 2018-02-10.
