= Shinmura Izuru =

Japanese linguist and essayist

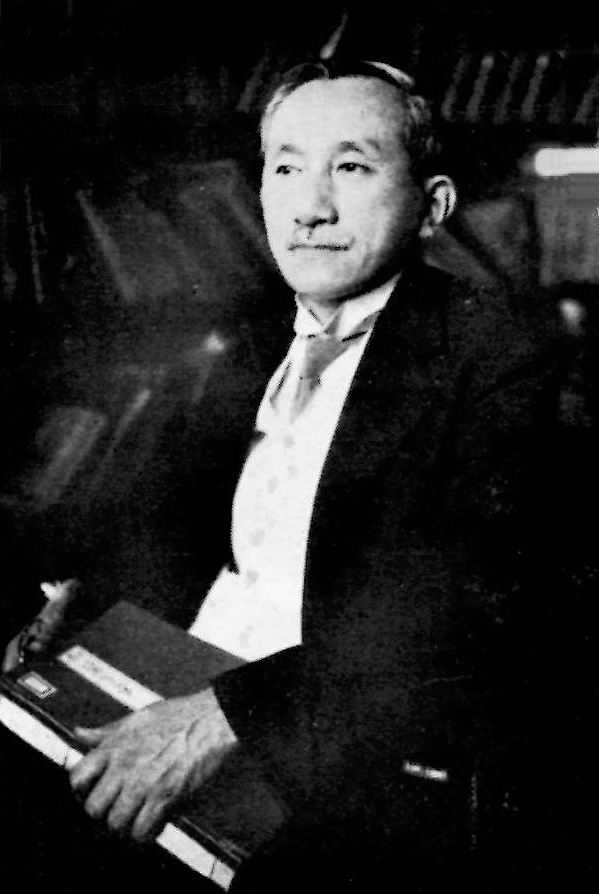
- Born: October 4, 1876; Japan Yamaguchi prefecture
- Died: August 17, 1967 (aged 90)
- Other name: 新村 出
- Occupation: linguist

Shinmura Izuru (新村 出; October 4, 1876 – August 17, 1967) was a Japanese linguist and essayist. He is best known for his many contributions to Japanese linguistics and lexicography. In honor of him, the Shinmura Izuru Prize is annually awarded for contributions to linguistics.

== Background ==
Shinmura was born in Yamaguchi prefecture on October 4, 1876. He graduated from the Tokyo Imperial University in 1899 where he studied philology under the instruction of Ueda Kazutoshi. Between 1906 and 1909 he studied abroad in England, Germany, and France where he studied linguistics. In 1919 he received a Doctor of Letters.

== Career ==
In 1902, Shimura taught at Tokyo Higher Normal School, and in 1904 at Tokyo Imperial University. After returning from studying abroad, he taught at Kyoto Imperial University for a number of years.

Shinmura introduced western linguists to Japan and created the fundamental foundation of modern Japanese linguistics. His research included a study of the historical development of the Japanese language, a comparative study of Japanese with neighboring languages, and etymology. He also made important contributions to the study of 16–17th-century Christian missionaries in Japan.

During his career, Shinmura compiled a number of Japanese dictionaries: Jien (辞苑; lit. "Garden of words") in 1935, Genrin (言林; lit. "Forest of words") in 1949, and Kōjien (広辞苑; lit. "Wide garden of words") in 1955, for which he is most known.

In 1956 Shinmura was awarded the Order of Culture for his many contributions.

== Major works ==
- Nanban Sarasa, Kaizōsha, 1924
- Nanban Kōki, Iwanami Shoten, 1925
- Tōhō Gengoshi Sōkō, Iwanami Shoten, 1927
- Tōa Gogen Shi, Oka Shoin, 1930
- Genrin, Zenkoku Shobō, 1949
- Kōjien, Iwanami Shoten, 1955
