= List of Japanese dictionaries =

Notable print, electronic, and online Japanese dictionaries
Title	Year (Period)	Notes
Dai Kan-Wa Jiten	1955–1960, 1990, 2000	Tetsuji Morohashi's Chinese-Japanese character dictionary, 13 volumes, 2 supplements, over 50,000 entries
Daijirin	1988, 1995, 2006	comprehensive single-volume Japanese dictionary, 3 editions
Daijisen	1995, 1998	general-purpose Japanese dictionary, 2 editions
Dictionary of Sources of Classical Japan	2006–present	English, French, and Japanese dictionary of classical Japanese literature
Diego Collado's Grammar of the Japanese Language	1632 (Edo period)	grammatical description of Japanese in framework of Latin grammar
EDICT	1991–present	Jim Breen's machine-readable multilingual Japanese dictionary, KANJIDIC for kanji, more than 180,000 entries
Eijirō	2002–2014	large English-Japanese translation database, 8 revisions
Gjiten	1999–2006	free software using GNOME development libraries, allows searching dictionaries like EDICT
Iroha Jiruishō	1165(?) (Heian period)	first kanji dictionary to collate characters by pronunciation rather than logographic radical, several revisions and expansions
Jikyōshū	1245(?) (Kamakura period)	Kanji dictionary with Chinese rime and Japanese pronunciations, 3 editions
Kagakushū	1444 (Muromachi period)	first semantically collated dictionary of Chinese characters, designed for average users rather than scholars, 3000 entries
Kenkyūsha's New Japanese-English Dictionary	1918 ... 2003	largest and most authoritative Japanese-English dictionary, 5 editions,
Kiten	2001–2006	KDE Software Compilation's program for learning kanji
Kodansha Kanji Learner's Dictionary	2002	Jack Halpern's Kanji-English dictionary, collated by SKIP system, also pronunciations and radical indexes
Kōjien	1955 ... 2008	Shinmura Izuru's bestselling authoritative single-volume dictionary, 6 editions, 240,000 entries
Kokushi Daijiten	1927, 1979–1997	general-purpose dictionary of Japanese history, 15 volumes
The Modern Reader's Japanese-English Character Dictionary	1962, 1974	Andrew Nelson's kanji dictionary, 5,446 entries
Moji	2011	open source, cross-platform extension for using Japanese and Chinese dictionaries
The New Nelson Japanese-English Character Dictionary	1997	John H. Haig's revised edition of The Modern Reader's Japanese-English Character Dictionary, 7,000 entries including variants
Nichi-Ran jiten	1934	Peter Adriaan van de Stadt's Japanese–Dutch dictionary, 33,800 entries
Nihon Kingendaishi Jiten	1978	dictionary of modern Japanese history from 1848 to 1975, 12,000 entries
Nihon Kokugo Daijiten	1972–1976, 2000–2002	largest Japanese language dictionary, 20-volume and 14-volume editions, 503,000 entries
Nihongo Daijiten	1989, 1995	Tadao Umesao's popular color-illustrated Japanese dictionary, 2 editions
Nippo Jisho	1603 (Edo period)	Japanese-Portuguese dictionary, first European language dictionary of Japanese, 32,293 entries, later translations in Spanish, French, and Japanese editions
Onkochishinsho	1484 (Muromachi period)	first Japanese dictionary collated in the now standard gojūon system, 13,000 entries
Rakuyōshū	1598 (Muromachi period)	first dictionary to separate kanji pronunciation between Sino-Japanese on'yomi and native kun-yomi readings
Ruiju Myōgishō	1100 (Heian period)	usage examples from over 130 Chinese classics and Japanese literature, collated by 120-radical system, 32,000 entries
Sanseido Kokugo Jiten	1960 ... 2014	general-purpose dictionary, quotes contemporary usage examples, 7 editions, 82,000 entries
Setsuyōshū	1496 (Muromachi period)	popular early dictionary collated in iroha order, contemporaneous usage examples, many later editions
Shin Meikai kokugo jiten	1972 ... 2020	a best-selling Japanese dictionary, 8 editions
Shinsen Jikyō	0901 (Heian period)	first dictionary to include Japanese kun'yomi readings and kokuji characters, 21,300 entries
Shogakukan Progressive Japanese-English Dictionary	1986 ... 2012	medium-sized learners' dictionary, 5 editions, 13,800 entries
Tenrei Banshō Meigi	0835 (Heian period)	Kūkai's classic dictionary adapted from the (c. 543) Chinese Yupian, 1,000 character entries, 534-radical system collation
Wagokuhen	1489 (Muromachi period)	Japanized version of the Chinese Yupian dictionary, katakana annotations for on'yomi and kun'yomi pronunciations
Wamyō Ruijushō	0938 (Heian period)	first Japanese dictionary collated by semantic fields, gives Chinese pronunciations, Japanese readings in ancient Man'yōgana transcription, and definitions
Wordtank	1989	early Japanese electronic dictionary for learners of kanji
Wordtank G50	2004	updated export version Wordtank with Japanese-English and English-Japanese dictionaries, superseded by G70
WWWJDIC	1998–present	Jim Breen's searchable online EDICT Japanese-English dictionary server, additional versions in German, French, Russian, Hungarian, Swedish, Spanish, Italian, and Dutch

== See also ==
- List of Chinese dictionaries
- List of English dictionaries
- List of French dictionaries
- List of etymological dictionaries
