= 部 =

部 is the Chinese character for "part, division". It may refer to:

- a government ministry
  - Ministries of South Korea
- numbering by Iroha
  - in the Japanese addressing system
  - Setsuyōshū
- Section headers of a Chinese dictionary
  - Kangxi radicals
  - Wamyō Ruijushō
  - Ruiju Myōgishō
  - Shinsen Jikyō
