= Ghost characters =

Erroneous kanji included in JIS X 0208

Ghost characters (Japanese: 幽霊文字, Hepburn: yūrei moji) are erroneous kanji included in the Japanese Industrial Standard, JIS X 0208. Of the 6,355 kanji characters, there are 12 ghost characters.

== Overview ==
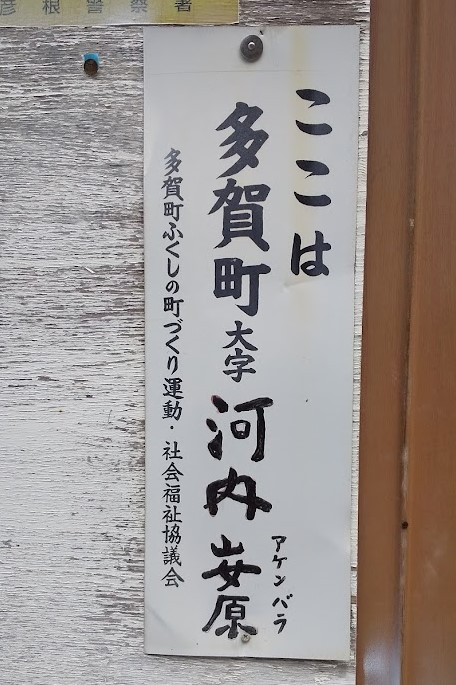
Address sign for Akenbara, Oaza-Kawachi Taga Town (𡚴原, 大字河内, 多賀町). The ghost kanji 妛 is a miswriting of 𡚴.

In 1978, the Ministry of Trade and Industry established the standard JIS C 6226 (later JIS X 0208). This standard defined 6,349 characters as JIS Level 1 and 2 kanji characters. This set of Kanji characters is called "JIS Basic Kanji". At this time, the following four lists of Kanji characters were used as sources.

1. Kanji Table for Standard Codes (Draft): IPSJ Kanji Code Committee (1971)
2. National Land Administrative Districts Directory: Geographical Society of Japan (1972)
3. Nippon Seimei's family name table: Nippon Life (1973, no longer extant)
4. Basic Kanji for Administrative Information Processing: Administrative Management Agency (1975)

At the time of the establishment of the standard, the authority for each character was not clearly stated, and it was pointed out that some characters had unknown meanings and usage examples. The term ghost character was coined from ghost word, meaning a word that is included in dictionaries but has no practical use. The most common examples are 妛 and 彁. These characters were never mentioned in the Kangxi Dictionary or the Dai Kan-Wa Jiten, a comprehensive collection of ancient Chinese character books.

In 1997, the drafting committee for the revised standard, led by its chairman, Koji Shibano, and Hiroyuki Sasahara of the National Institute for Japanese Language and Linguistics, investigated the literature referred to in the drafting of the 1978 standard. It was revealed that many of the characters that had been considered ghost characters were actually kanji used in place names.

According to the survey, prior to the drafting of the 1978 standard, the Administrative Management Agency had compiled eight lists of Kanji characters, including the above 1–3, in 1974, entitled "Frequency of Use and Correspondence Analysis Results of Kanji Characters for Selection of Standard Kanji Characters for Administrative Information Processing." This is accompanied by a list of kanji characters and their original sources. The results of this correspondence analysis, rather than the original sources, were referred to when selecting the JIS basic kanji at that time. Of these, many ghost characters were found to be included in those based on the Comprehensive list of administrative divisions of national land and List of Kanji characters for personal names by Nippon Life Insurance Company. In particular, the List of Kanji characters for personal names had no original source at the time of drafting the first standard, and its contents have been pointed out to be inadequate.

In response to these results, the Standard Revision Committee restored the 1972 edition of the Comprehensive list of administrative divisions of national land from its proofreading history, and checked all the kanji appearing in the book against all the pages to confirm the examples. In addition, as a replacement for the List of Kanji characters for personal names, which no longer exists, they conducted an exhaustive literature search, including a comparative study of the NTT and Nippon Telegraph and Telephone Public Corporation telephone directory databases and a survey of more than 30 ancient and modern character books.

There are twelve kanji characters that remain unidentified, of which three appear to be typos. The other eight characters have been found in ancient Japanese or Chinese dictionaries. For the character 彁 (ka), no concrete source has been found.

Ghost characters have already been adopted into international standards such as Unicode, and changes to these standards are likely to cause compatibility problems, making it difficult to modify or remove ghost characters.

== List of ghost characters ==
=== Identified sources ===
The results of the aforementioned survey by Hiroyuki Sasahara et al. are summarized in Annex 7, "Detailed Description of Ward Locations", of JIS X 0208:1997. This section excerpts some of them.

JIS X 0208:1997 compiles the details of the sources of 72 characters whose sources have been identified, mainly those not listed in both Morohashi's Dai Kan-Wa Jiten and Kadokawa's Shin Jigen. However, this also includes characters that have been found to be miswritten by the original sources.

The list of delimiters appended as "source authority" in Annex 7 of JIS X 0208:1997 lists 72 characters, but the detailed text does not list 鰛 (82-60), and although 幤 (54-82) is marked as "source authority," it is not listed in the list of 72 characters.

Some of these are listed in the table below, including some that are known to be typos in the original text.

Character	Address	Notes
囎	51-85	There are examples in the National Land Administrative Districts Directory, but no longer exists. 囎唹郡 becoming 曽於郡 (Sō-gun; Soo District) in Kagoshima Prefecture.
垈	52-18	There are examples in the National Land Administrative Districts Directory. 藤垈 (Fujinuta), 相垈 (Ainuta), 大垈 (Onuta), all in Yamanashi Prefecture.
垉	52-21	There are examples in the National Land Administrative Districts Directory. 垉六 (Horoku) in Aichi Prefecture.
堽	52-46	There are examples in the National Land Administrative Districts Directory, but no longer exists. 堽内 becoming 堤内 (Hisagiuchi) in Oita Prefecture.
岾	54-19	There are examples in the National Land Administrative Districts Directory. 広岾町 (Hiroyama-cho) becoming 広帖町 (Kouchou-cho), in Kyoto Prefecture.
恷	55-78	Based on Nippon Seimei's family name table. There are also examples in the NTT telephone directory.
档	59-67	There are examples in the National Land Administrative Districts Directory. 档ヶ山 (Mount Mategayama), Kagoshima Prefecture.
椡	60-17	There are examples in the National Land Administrative Districts Directory. 三ツ椡 (Mitsukunugi), Niigata Prefecture.
橸	60-81	Dictionary of Japanese Place Names. 石橸 (Ishidaru), Shizuoka Prefecture.
汢	61-73	There are examples in the National Land Administrative Districts Directory. 汢川 (Nutanokawa), Kochi Prefecture.
碵	66-83	Based on Nippon Seimei's family name table. There are also examples in the NTT telephone directory.
穃	67-46	There is an example of usage in the National Land Administrative Districts Directory, but it is a typo in the original source. 穃原 becoming 榕原 (Youbaru) in Okinawa Prefecture.
粐	68-68	There are examples in the National Land Administrative Districts Directory. 粐蒔沢 (Nukamakizawa) in Akita Prefecture.
粭	68-70	There are examples in the National Land Administrative Districts Directory. 粭島 (Sukumojima), Yamaguchi Prefecture.
粫	68-72	There is an example in the National Land Administrative Districts Directory, but it is a typo in the original source. 粫田 (Uruchida) becoming 糯田 (Mochida) in Fukushima Prefecture.
糘	68-84	There are examples in the National Land Administrative Districts Directory. 糘尻 (Sukumojiri) in Hiroshima Prefecture.
膤	71-19	There are examples in the National Land Administrative Districts Directory. 膤割 (Yukiwari), Kumamoto Prefecture.
軅	77-32	There is an example in the National Land Administrative Districts Directory, but no longer exists. 軅飛 (Takatobu) becoming 鷹飛 (Takatobi), Fukushima Prefecture.
鍄	78-93	There are examples in the National Land Administrative Districts Directory. 小鍄 (Kogasugai), Yamagata Prefecture.
鵈	82-94	There is an example in the National Land Administrative Districts Directory, but it is a typo in the original source. 鵈沢 (Misagosawa, supposed to be 鵃沢), Fukushima Prefecture.

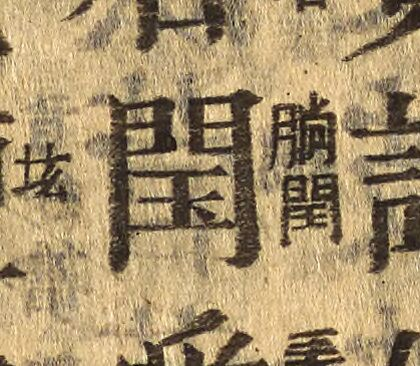
閠 in the Vietnamese book, Tam thiên tự (1886).

=== Unknown sources ===
JIS X 0208:1997 treats the twelve characters in the table below as "Authority unknown", "Unknown", or "Unidentifiable" because it is not certain which of the four aforementioned lists of kanji is the source of the characters.

Since ghost characters are "kanji that do not exist", the readings are given "for convenience".

Character	Code	Supposed pronunciation	Source	Other appearances
墸	52-55	cho	Origin unknown.	It is in the Jiyun abridgment, but it may be miswritten.
壥	52-63	den	Origin unknown. Possibly a typo of 㕓.	Written in the Wagokuhen. 壥 is used in chữ Nôm with the reading of giềng used in the compound, láng giềng ('neighbour').
妛	54-12	shi	This character is cited in the National Land Administrative Districts Directory, but it is not there. Possibly a typo of 𡚴.	It is in the Jikyōshū abridgment, but it may be miswritten.
彁	55-27	ka, sei	Origin unknown. Possibly a typo of 彊 or something similar.	Unidentifiable.
挧	57-43	u, tochi	The site is cited in the National Land and Administrative Districts Directory, but it is not there. Possibly a variant or typo of 栩, etc.	Zhonghua Zihai and others.
暃	58-83	hi	The site is cited in the National Land and Administrative Districts Directory, but it is not there. Possibly a typo of 杲, etc.	It is found in the Japanese Hokke Sandaibu Nanjiki, but maybe a variant or a typo of 罪.
椦	59-91	ken	The site is cited in the National Land and Administrative Districts Directory, but it is not there. Possibly a typo of 橳, etc.	It is found in the Yiqiejing yinyi.
槞	60-57	ru, rou	The site is cited in the National Land and Administrative Districts Directory, but it is not there. Possibly a typo of 境.	"Popular calligraphy since the Song and Yuan Dynasties" (宋元以來俗字譜) published by the Institute of History and Linguistics, Academia Sinica of the Republic of China in 1930. 槞 is also used in chữ Nôm with the reading of trồng ('to plant').
蟐	74-12	jou, momu	The Basic Kanji for Administrative Information Processing is used as the source (Meiji Mutual Life Insurance Company Kanji Code Table), but there are no examples.	It is found in the Shinsen Jikyō.
袮	74-57	ne, nai	The site is cited in the National Land and Administrative Districts Directory, but it is not there. Possibly a typo of 祢.	Shinsen Jikyō, Ruiju Myōgishō and others.
閠	79-64	gyoku, nin	The site is cited in the National Land and Administrative Districts Directory, but it is not there. Possibly a miswriting of 閏.	It is listed on Guangyun, but it is probably a typo. In Vietnamese Literary Chinese texts, 閠 is a variant character of 閏.
駲	81-50	shu, jun	The source of the information is the Nihon Seimei Jinmei Chart, but the original source is not available.	It is found in the Ruiju Myōgishō.

=== Possible typos ===
Some of the characters of unknown authority are believed to have been miswritten by the standard's creator.

- It is possible that 壥 was miswritten because 㕓, which is similar to 壥, is not included in the JIS Basic Kanji. 㕓 is also not included in JIS X 0213.
- It is possible that 妛 was miswritten because 𡚴, which is similar to 妛, is not included in the JIS Basic Kanji. In the National Land Administrative Districts Index, the source for this document, there is a shadow-like print mark on the overlay that appears to have been created by cutting and pasting together parts of different characters when creating the block, and it is assumed that this was mistakenly transcribed as a horizontal stroke.
- It is possible that 椦 was miswritten because 橳, which is similar to 椦, is not included in the JIS Basic Kanji.

== Treatment in dictionaries ==
Since the establishment of the standard, the policy for compiling dictionaries has been to publish character books that are based on the assumption that all JIS basic Kanji characters are listed. For ghost characters, it is not possible to refer to past sources. Therefore, their treatment differed depending on the dictionaries and individual characters as follows.

=== Makeshift readings assigned ===
In equipment that implements JIS basic Kanji characters, they are often assigned a phonetic reading. Some dictionaries also list these makeshift readings. Hiroyuki Sasahara points out that these readings may have been given based on a research report by the Japan Electronics and Information Technology Industries Association (1982) and published materials by NEC (1982) and IBM Japan (1983).

=== Regarded as variations of similar characters ===
The character 妛 may be a typo of the very similar character 𡚴 (the upper 山 radical becomes 屮), and it is found in the Dai Kan-Wa Jiten and Kangxi Dictionary. This is also introduced in the JIS X 0208:1997 survey with an example of implicit merging with an authoritative source. These two characters are also merged into the same code point in Unicode. Similarly, some dictionaries have assigned 駲 as a variant of 馴 and 軅 as a variant of 軈.

=== Individual interpretations ===
Since 竜 is a variant of 龍, there is an interpretation that 槞 is a variant of 櫳. Some dictionaries consider 鵈 to be the character for black kites.

=== Explained as unknown ===
After the results of the research above were published, these contents were generally adopted in dictionaries. The Dai Kan-Wa Jiten published a supplemental volume in 2000; the characters 垈, 垉, 岾, 橸, 汢, 粭, 糘, 膤, 軅, and 鵈 were recorded there. Kadokawa's Shin Jigen (New Character Source) was revised in 2017 to include all JIS standards first through fourth, including ghost characters.

== In other languages ==
National Standards
Unicode	JIS X 0208 (Japan)	GB2312 (China)	CNS 11643 (Taiwan)	KS C 5601 (South Korea)
妛 U+599B	妛 (562C)	妛 (265A)	妛 (2553)	—N/a
閠 U+95A0	閠 (6F60)	閠 (4368)	閠 (457B)	—N/a
岾 U+5CBE	岾 (5633)	岾 (7D5A)	—N/a	岾 (6F40)

Since Chinese characters (including Japanese kanji) have been used in East Asian countries since ancient times and have been handed down mainly by handwriting, characters have arisen with slightly different writing styles from country to country or within a single country, so-called variant Chinese characters. Unicode did not adopt all variations, and characters with only slight differences were included and registered.

On the other hand, combining simple parts of Chinese characters to create another character has also been done in different countries and regions. As a result, the same Chinese characters may be invented in different countries by coincidence with different (sometimes identical) meanings.

As mentioned above, it is presumed that the Japanese ghost character "妛" was originally just "𡚴", which is a combination of "山" and "女", but with an accidental "一" in between. On the other hand, there is a Chinese character in China "妛" which is a combination of "屮", "一", and "女" which is also a variant of "媸". However, in Unicode, "妛", which did not originally exist in Japan, was encompassed because it happened to be similar to "妛". Moreover, the Japanese character "妛", which is a mistake, was registered as a Unicode character.

Also, the Japanese ghost character "閠" (lower part "玉") is thought to be a miswriting of "閏" (lower part "王"). A 16th-century manuscript of the Japanese 15th-century Wagokuhen also has the character "閠", but it is a solitary example. On the other hand, the Chinese character "閠" in China is a variant of "閏", which is not a miswriting. This was also unified in Unicode.

Some believe that the Japanese ghost character "岾" is a kokuji (a uniquely Japanese kanji) meaning bald mountains, and was originally a miswriting of "岵". In Korea, however, this character was created as a Chinese character meaning mountain pass. This was also unified in Unicode.

== Contemporary use ==
Since the publishing of the standard, examples of ghost characters have appeared along with their widespread use.

The 祢宜, the title of the deputy manager of a Japanese shrine, is sometimes misused as 袮宜 (using the ghost 袮 character) In some cases, the Japanese surname 栩谷 is mistaken for 挧谷 (using the ghost 挧 character). Japanese folklorist Motoji Niwa introduced the surname 妛芸凡 (Akiōshi) in his book.

The Asahi Shimbun database contained the name 埼玉自彊会 printed in its February 23, 1923 edition, but when it was digitized, it was incorrectly labeled 埼玉自彁会 (with the ghost 彁), which has since been corrected.

=== Examples of use in fiction ===
Japanese tokusatsu television series Gosei Sentai Dairanger features a character named 嘉挧 (Kaku). The name is taken from the ancient Chinese statesman Jia Xu (賈詡), but the characters were replaced by ghost characters because the character 詡 is not registered in JIS X 0208.

The book 5A73, by Japanese mystery writer Yuji Yomisaka, begins with a series of murders in which the ghost character 暃 is written on the bodies of the victims.

The music game Beatmania IIDX includes a song titled 閠槞彁の願い that uses ghost characters. According to the comments on the song, the pronunciation is "unpronounceable to humans" and is tentatively called "Gyokurōka no Negai" (ぎょくろうかのねがい), which is the ateji reading of the ghost characters.

Similarly, multiple installments of the rhythm game series Taiko no Tatsujin include a song simply titled "彁," or "Ka." This is a notoriously strange and difficult track added as an April Fools' update in 2021, and is only unlockable via QR code.

== Similar cases in Unicode ==
The CJK Unified Ideographs in Unicode also have characters whose inclusion history is unknown and are sometimes called "ghost characters" as well. For example, it has been pointed out that the character 螀 (U+8780), which was also registered in Unicode due to being included in the CCITT Chinese Primary Set, may be a typographical error that was adopted without sufficiently checking for sources.

U+237C ⍼ RIGHT ANGLE WITH DOWNWARDS ZIGZAG ARROW was added by Monotype Imaging to its mathematical sets in 1972 for unknown reasons. It has since been included in Unicode.

In the CJK Compatibility block of Unicode 1.0, there is a square version of the Japanese word for "baht", written in katakana script. The Japanese for "baht" is バーツ (bātsu). However, the reference glyph ⟨㌬⟩ and the character name correspond to パーツ (pātsu, from English "parts"). The CJK codepoint, U+332C ㌬ SQUARE PAATU, is documented in subsequent versions of the standard as "a mistaken, unused representation" and users are directed to U+0E3F ฿ THAI CURRENCY SYMBOL BAHT instead. Consequently, only a few computer fonts have any content for this codepoint and its use is deprecated.
