= Rakuyōshū =

1598 Japanese dictionary

The Rakuyōshū (落葉集; "Collection of Fallen Leaves"), written in the front page as Racvyoxyv, (Note: The v was another way to write u, and the x was pronounced as "sh" like in the portuguese.) is a 1598 Japanese dictionary of kanji "Chinese characters" and compounds in three parts. The Jesuit Mission Press published it at Nagasaki along with other early Japanese language reference works, such as the 1603 Nippo Jisho Japanese–Portuguese dictionary. The Rakuyōshū, also known as the Rakuyoshu or Rakuyôshû, is notable as the first dictionary to separate kanji readings between Chinese loanword on (音 "pronunciation") and native Japanese kun (訓 "meaning").

In contrast with the numerous Rakuyōshū studies written in Japanese, the primary research in English is by Joseph Koshimi Yamagiwa, Professor of Japanese at the University of Michigan, and Don Clifford Bailey, Professor of Japanese at the University of Arizona.

== Title ==
Although the title Rakuyōshū (落葉集) literally reads as a shū (集 "collection; assembly") of rakuyō (落葉 "fallen leaves", or ochiba 落ち葉 in kun reading), the preface explains it metaphorically means "collection, in iroha order, of fallen (left-over, overlooked) words".

To be sure, many Japanese dictionaries have appeared in the world before now. Of these, however, it may be said that they are deficient either in that they provide the koe [Chinese reading] of characters, omitting the yomi [Japanese reading], or that they record the yomi and ignore the koe. Herein we propose to assemble "left-over [rakusaku]" kanji and compounds long in use but hitherto overlooked and to arrange them, after the manner of the Irohashū, in iroha order, their on [Chinese readings] to be on the right and their yomi to be on the left, and thus to produce in one volume a dictionary to be designated the Rakuyōshū. Thereafter we propose to add a section of characters and compounds similarly grouped in iroha order but arranged in terms of their Japanese readings.

Rakusaku comes from the Classical Chinese word luosuo (落索 "wither, shrivel; fall low, fall on hard times; lonely, lonesome"). Thus, the title blends raku (落 "fall; drop") meaning words "dropped" (overlooked, missed) by other Japanese dictionaries plus yōshū (葉集, or hashū in on-reading) abbreviating Irohashū (色葉集 "iroha collection") meaning a dictionary collated in iroha order (e.g., the 12th-century Iroha Jiruishō). Despite the compiler's intention of including overlooked words, Bailey discovered that more than half of the Rakuyōshū entries are found in contemporary Japanese dictionaries, primarily 15th-century Setsuyōshū editions, and many others occur in Chinese rime dictionaries.

== Contents ==
The Rakuyōshū text comprises 108 folios (chō 丁 "leaf of paper, folio; block") in three parts, succinctly described by Joseph Koshimi Yamagiwa.

(1) A 62-folio section consisting of (a) the Rakuyōshū proper, which is a listing of Chinese-Japanese characters (kanji) and compounds arranged in terms of their on pronunciations, that is, the pronunciations borrowed into Japanese from Chinese, (b) a list of the characters used in writing the numbers, and (c) some errata;

(2) a 27-folio section consisting of (a) the Irohajishū 色葉字集, which is a listing of kanji and compounds arranged in terms of their kun pronunciations, that is, the pronunciations of the Japanese words represented by the Chinese characters, (b) some errata, (c) a listing of the names of one hundred Japanese government offices together with their Chinese equivalents, and (d) a listing of the sixty-odd provinces of Japan; and

(3) a 19-folio section consisting of (a) the Shōgokuhen 小玉篇, which is a listing of the kanji in terms of 105 'radicals,' and (b) some errata.

Part (I), entitled the Rakuyōshū, gives Chinese on readings of kanji and kanji compounds. It includes nearly 1,700 main character entries (boji 母字 "mother character; head character") with approximately 12,000 run-on entries of multi-character compounds (jukuji 熟字 "compound; idiom; phrase").

Part (2), the Irohajishū ("Iroha-ordered character collection"), gives the equivalent Japanese kun readings of kanji. It is less than half the size of (1) and only gives about one-fourth as many kanji compounds, around 3,000. The Irohajishū frequently lists graphic variants that have homophonous kun readings, for instance, defining hō 芳 "fragrance; aroma", fun 芬 "sweet smell; fragrance; perfume", and kō 香 "scent; aroma; fragrance; incense" as Japanese kōbashii "nice-smelling; savory; aromatic; fragrant; favorable". This part includes two appendices: the Hyakkan narabi ni Tōmyō no taigai (百官並唐名之大概 "Outline of the hundred government offices and their Chinese equivalents") and the Nippon Rokujūyoshū (日本六十餘州 "The 60-odd provinces of Japan") gazetteer.

Part (3), the Shōgokuhen (小玉篇 "Little Yupian"), classifies 2,366 characters, mostly from Parts (1) and (2), according to 105 (bushu 部首) "radicals" and gives their respective on and kun readings. The title and format follow the circa 543 CE Chinese Yupian ("Jade Chapters") dictionary, in analogy to the circa 1489 Wagokuhen ("Japanese Yupian"). The Shōgokuhen begins with an index that semantically classifies the radicals under 12 headings (mon 門 "gates") of tenmon (天文 "natural phenomena"), chiri (地理 "geographical features"), jinbutsu (人物 "human matters"), etc., and gives the radical numbers within the main text. Unlike previous Japanese dictionaries, this index also gives a common name for each radical. Another feature useful to students of Japanese kanji was cross-listing some characters under more than one component radicals (kō or suki 好 "like; love" can be listed under the "woman radical" 女 and the "child radical" 子).

== Textual arrangement ==
Rakuyōshū Parts (1) and (2) are called the honpen (本編 "main text") and (3) is the kōhen (後編 "later text"). The main text is dated 1598 and the undated Shōgokuhen probably was published circa 1599.

One of the most significant lexicographical improvements in the Rakuyōshū is separately listing the on and kun readings of kanji. Contemporary Sengoku period Japanese dictionaries like the Setsuyōshū listed characters by one or the other, or mixed them. Bailey believes the reason was because the Rakuyōshū was designed for Europeans who could not easily distinguish between on and kun readings.

This dictionary's internal arrangement combines the main text giving on and kun readings for kanji according to iroha order with the later index giving readings arranged by graphic radicals. Dictionary users who know either the Japanese or Chinese reading of a character can locate it in the main text, and those who cannot ascertain a character's reading can find it through the radical index.

Unlike the Nippo Jisho, this dictionary does not use rōmaji to romanize Japanese pronunciation, other than the title page spelling Racuyoxu. This unique Jesuit romanization system was based on Portuguese and differs from the usual Hepburn romanization. The Japanese historical linguist Morita Takeshi (森田武) discovered that many Rakuyōshū character entries and almost half of the compound entries are alphabetized in the Jesuit system; most consistently after the 12th kana wo を. Bailey summarizes that

the arrangement of compounds in the main text of the Rakuyōshū is primarily alphabetic, but inconsistent to the extent that words of related meanings are often grouped together, especially in the early portions of the honpen. In addition, there are a few places where entries are listed in apparently arbitrary order, neither alphabetic nor semantic arrangement obtaining.

== Historical aspects ==
The preface

Japanese Kirishitan ban (キリシタン版 "Christian publications") refers to the books, grammars, and dictionaries published 1591–1611 by the Jesuit Mission Press. In 1590, the Italian Jesuit missionary Alessandro Valignano brought a movable type printing press to Japan. Compared with contemporary woodblock printing in Japan, Üçerler calls this technological superiority the "First IT Revolution".

The Rakuyōshū is printed in kanji characters and hiragana syllabary. The kanji font resembles handwritten semi-cursive script more than printed Japanese regular script. The hiragana font includes some outdated hentaigana forms.

In the history of Japanese printing, the Rakuyōshū was the first movable-type dictionary to incorporate two kana innovations that were already used in handwritten Japanese, and have survived to this day. Furigana is printing smaller kana alongside a kanji to indicate the pronunciation, a practice which allows less-educated people to read Chinese characters. Handakuten (半濁点) is printing a small circle to the upper right of a kana to indicate the voiceless bilabial stop /p/; for example, compare ha, hi, hu (は, ひ, ふ) with pa, pi, pu (ぱ, ぴ, ぷ).

Most of the original Rakuyōshū copies were lost. Today, only four complete copies, two incomplete copies and two collections of fragments are known. Two complete copies survived during the turbulent feudal period of Japanese history: one is now held by the Tenri Central Library, in Tenri, Nara, and the other is held by the British Library through Ernest Satow who bought this copy from an antique dealer in Edo. The other two complete copies are preserved in Europe, by the Earl of Balcarres, and the Society of Jesus in Rome. Two Rakuyūshū copies missing Part (3) are owned by the Leiden University Library and the Bibliothèque Nationale in Paris. Two collections of fragments are held by the Tenri Central Library and the Bibliothèque Nationale, respectively.

== Conclusion ==
"The Rakuyōshū, being a product of the Jesuit Mission Press and the Jesuits' views on the treatment of kanji and kana," concludes Bailey, "possesses a rigid yet comprehensive format making it something of a milestone in dictionary compilation in Japan." He lists six of this dictionary's aspects that enhanced its usefulness four centuries ago and make it of interest today:

1. Its reproduction of kanji not in the square or printed style but in a form resembling longhand.
2. Its attempt to use phonetic rather than historical kana spellings of Japanese words.
3. Its use of alphabetization as a major sorting device in the listing of entries in the main text.
4. Its semantic classification of radicals in the index of the "Shōgokuhen."
5. Its listing of kanji under more than one radical in the "Shōgokuhen."
6. Its fairly consistent use, in kana spellings, of small circles (han-dakuten) to distinguish words pronounced with a voiceless bilabial stop.
