= Jikyōshū =

1245 Japanese dictionary of Chinese characters

The Jikyōshū (字鏡集; "Mirror of Characters Collection") was a circa 1245 CE Japanese dictionary of Chinese characters. The "Mirror of Characters" title echoes the (circa 900 CE) Shinsen Jikyō, and the internal organization closely follows the (circa 1100 CE) Ruiju Myōgishō.

This Jikyōshū dictionary exists in three editions of 3, 7, and 20 fascicles (kan 卷, "scroll; volume"). The anonymous 3-fascicle edition, also known as the Jikyōshō (字鏡抄, "Mirror of Characters, Annotated"), is presumably the original version. The 7-fascicle edition has a postscript dated 1245 that mentions the Buddhist monk Ogawa Shōchō (小川承澄, 1205-1281 CE), but does not clarify his editorial role. The 20-fascicle edition records the Kamakura Period court noble Sugawara no Tamenaga (菅原為長, 1158-1246 CE) as the dictionary editor. He likely compiled it at the end of his life, in the Kangen era (1243-1247 CE).

Head entries in the Jikyōshū give the kanji, rime group (from the Guangyun), on'yomi Sino-Japanese reading (usually in Chinese fanqie), and kun'yomi Japanese reading in katakana. "Compared to the last preceding similar dictionary, the twelfth-century Ruiju Myōgishō," writes Bailey, "it is a greatly Japanized work."

The primary collation of the Jikyōshū is by logographic radical, with the characters under a given radical further organized semantically. The 7-fascicle edition has 12 headings (mon 門), which the 20-fascicle version reduces to 9. These 12 semantic headings are clearly adapted from the first 13 of the 21 headings in the Iroha Jiruishō. They begin with Tenshō (天象, "astronomical phenomena") and end with Jiji (辞字, "miscellaneous 1-character words"), with one change: Iroha Jiruishō headings 8 and 9, Inshoku (飲食, "foods, drinks") and Zatsubutsu (雑物, "miscellaneous things"), are combined into Jikyōshū heading 8 Zatsubutsu. The 20-fascicle Jikyōshū edition likewise combines Inshoku and Zatsubutsu into heading 8 and omits Iroha Jiruishō headings 5, 10, 11, and 12.

The modern Mojikyo computer font software includes character data from the ancient Shinsen Jikyō and Jikyōshū.
