= G50 =

G50 may refer to:

- Wordtank G50, the flagship model of the Wordtank line of Electronic Japanese dictionary by Canon
- Matchless G50, a British motorcycle made by Associated Motorcycles at the former Matchless works in Plumstead, London
- The G50 Shanghai–Chongqing Expressway in China

G-50 may refer to:

- a 1950 international agreement on Greenland
- Group of Fifty, a non-profit, non-partisan initiative based in Washington D.C., USA, that is primarily concerned with fostering more openness between business leaders and promoting economic development and social progress in the Western Hemisphere
- Zenoah G-50 – two stroke aircraft engine

G.50 may refer to:

- Fiat G.50, a World War II Italian fighter aircraft
