= Hunqie =

Type of Chinese characters

Hǔnqiè 混切, or "mixed fǎnqiè", specifies Chinese characters where there is inconsistent evidence about whether the initial of the Middle Chinese reader of the character is a labiodental or a bilabial. There are three types. In the first type the upper fǎnqiè speller (qièshàngzì 切上字) indicates a labiodental but the lower fǎnqiè speller (qièxiàzì 切下字) does not belong to the 10 labiodental rimes (qīngchúnshíyùn 輕唇十韻). The second type is when the upper fǎnqiè speller is a bilabial but the lower fǎnqiè speller belongs to the 10 labiodental rimes. The third type is when the upper fǎnqiè speller points to a labiodental and the lower fǎnqiè speller belongs to the 10 labiodental rimes, but the character that is glossed is a bilabial according to the Guǎngyùn《廣韻》.
