= Onkochishinsho =

Japanese dictionary

- Author: Ōtomo Hirokimi
- Original title: 温故知新書
- Language: Japanese
- Genre: Dictionary
- Published: 1484
- Publication place: Japan

The Onkochishinsho (温故知新書; "Book of Reviewing the Old and Knowing the New") was the first Japanese dictionary to collate words in the now standard gojūon order. This Muromachi Period dictionary's title uses a Classical Chinese four-character idiom from the Lunyu: "The Master said, "If a man keeps cherishing his old knowledge, so as continually to be acquiring new, he may be a teacher of others." (tr. Legge).

The preface to the Onkochishinsho is dated 1484 (Bunmei era), and gives the compiler's name as Ōtomo Hirokimi (大伴広公). It notes this little-known lexicographer was a Shajinshi (社神司 "Earth God Official") in Shiragi (新羅 "ancient Korean kingdom of Silla"). Kaneko reads this fourth character as an honorific (公 "duke; lord") and identifies him as Ōtomo Taihiro 大伴泰広.

When Ōtomo chose to collate the Onkochishinsho in the 10 by 5 grid gojūon "fifty sounds" order (a-i-u-e-o), he went against centuries of Japanese dictionary tradition using the poetic iroha order (i-ro-ha-ni-ho). For example, the circa 1469 CE Setsuyōshū predecessor collates words primarily in iroha order, and secondarily under semantic headings.

== Contents ==
The Onkochishinsho enters about 13,000 words, collated first by gojūon and then by 12 subject classifications (mon 門), shown below.

Classified headings in the Onkochishinsho
Heading	Rōmaji	Kanji	Subject
1	Kenkon	乾坤	Heaven and Earth
2	Jikō	時候	Seasons
3	Kikei	気形	Creatures
4	Shitai	支体	Anatomy
5	Taigei	態芸	Art and Form
6	Seishoku	生植	Plants
7	Shokufuku	食服	Food and Clothing
8	Kizai	器財	Utensils
9	Kōsai	光彩	Colours
10	Sūryō	数量	Weights and Measures
11	Kyoō	虚押	Particles
12	Fukuyō	複用	Reduplicatives

The Onkochishinsho preface credits these 12 categories to the 1341–1346 CE Kaizō ryakuin (海蔵略韻 "Outline of Rimes [prepared at] Kaizō [Temple]"), compiled by the Rinzai Zen priest and scholar Kokan Shiren. However, since the received Kaizō ryakuin edition has 14 mon headings, Bailey concludes either it originally had 12, or the preface means Kokan's earlier 1306–1307 CE Jubun inryaku (聚分韻略 "Rime Outline, Classified and Explained") that has these same 12 headings. Both of Kokan's Sino-Japanese dictionaries were primarily collated by 106 Chinese rime table categories, and secondarily by subject headings. While continuing the Muromachi dictionary tradition of semantic categories for secondary ordering, like the Jubun inryaku and Setsuyōshū; the Onkochishinsho principally collated word entries with well-known Japanese gojūon instead of iroha ordering or arcane Chinese rimes.

Although many Japanese dictionaries published after the Onkochishinsho continued to use bookish iroha instead of user-friendly gojūon order, it eventually became the dominant lexicographic arrangement.
