= Ruiju Myōgishō =

Japanese dictionary from the Heian Period

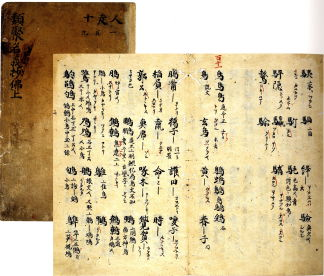
Ruiju myōgishō, located in the Tenri Central Library in Nara, Japan

The Ruiju myōgishō (類聚名義抄; "Classified dictionary of pronunciations and meanings, annotated") is a Japanese dictionary from the late Heian Period. The title, sometimes abbreviated as Myōgishō, combines the ruiju ("classified dictionary") from the Wamyō Ruijushō and the myōgi ("pronunciation and meaning/definition") from the Tenrei Banshō Myōgi. Additional Buddhist titles, like Sanbō ruiju myōgishō (三宝類聚名義抄), use the word sanbō (三宝 "Three Jewels") because the text was divided into butsu (仏 "Buddha"), hō (法 "Dharma"), and sō (僧 "Sangha") sections.

The origins of the Ruiju myōgishō are uncertain. Don Clifford Bailey concludes it was "compiled early in the twelfth century, presumably by a priest". Kaneko believes the received edition dates from the late 12th century, but the original version was compiled around 1081–1100 CE. There are various received texts of the Ruiju myōgishō and several indexes.

Like other early Japanese dictionaries, the Ruiju myōgishō borrowed heavily from Chinese dictionaries, in particular the (c. 543 CE) Yupian and the (601 CE) Qieyun. For collation of character entries, the Chinese Yupian has a system of 542 logographic radicals. The Ruiju myōgishō cuts them down into 120 radicals (bu 部), even simpler than the (ca. 900 CE) Japanese Shinsen Jikyō system of 160.

The Ruiju myōgishō lists over 32,000 characters and compounds. The entries give both on'yomi Sino-Japanese borrowings and kun'yomi native Japanese readings for kanji, using Chinese fanqie spellings (from the Qieyun), Man'yōgana, and katakana. Meanings are often illustrated by quotations from over 130 Chinese classic texts and classical Japanese literature. These quotes have two types of Kanbun ("Chinese writing") annotations, shōten (声点 "tone marks") for Chinese tones and Japanese accents, and occasional kunten (訓点 "reading marks") for Japanese pronunciations. "Many passages contain no Japanese readings at all", says Bailey, "but there are a total of approximately 10,000 Japanese readings given in the whole work". While special care is needed for its commentary nature, the Ruiju myōgishō remains a standard Japanese source of information regarding Heian era pronunciation.

== Editions ==
There are various extant editions that still exist today. The main editions include:

- The Zushoryō (図書寮) edition. It is part of the Shoryōbu (書陵部) collection in the Imperial Household Agency. Compiled between 1081 and 1100. It retains signs of the original; however, it is incomplete and only contains the first half of the hō (法) section. It provides detailed literary citations for entries.
- The Kanchi-in (観智院) edition. It is part of the Tenri Central Library and is a national treasure of Japan. It is a mid-Kamakura period facsimile. While it is an expanded and revised edition of the original, it is the only complete edition surviving today.
- The Kōzan-ji edition. Part of the Tenri Central Library collection. It is entitled Sanbō ruiju jishū (三宝類字集), and is a revised edition. It only contains the butsu (仏) section and part of the 巻上 section found in the Kanji-in edition.
- The Hōbodai-in (宝菩提院) edition. It is part of the Tō-ji Hōbodai-in collection. Revised and incomplete.

In addition to the above, the Ren'jō-in (蓮成院) and Sainen-ji (西念寺) revised editions exist, but both are incomplete.
