= Angzarr =

Obscure typographical symbol

⍼o

Angzarr
- In Unicode: U+237C ⍼ RIGHT ANGLE WITH DOWNWARDS ZIGZAG ARROW

The angzarr (⍼) is an obscure typographical symbol with unconfirmed meaning. Typographic catalogs from the 1950s and 1960s refer to it as a mathematical symbol for azimuth, but real-life usage has not yet been found.

The symbol gained notoriety in the 2020s when researchers investigated how this unknown symbol entered the Unicode character set, propagating it to all modern computer systems.

The name is from an abbreviation of its ISO 9573-13 name, "Angle with Down Zig-zag Arrow", also reflected in its Unicode name, "Right Angle with Downwards Zigzag Arrow". Its HTML entity reference, originally defined in ISO 9573-13 for use in SGML, is &angzarr;. It has been included in Unicode since version 3.2.

== History ==
The earliest known usage of the Angzarr is found in H. Berthold AG typographic catalogs from the 1950s and 1960s. In them, the symbol is listed under the Mathematical Symbols section, with the description "Azimut, Richtungswinkel" (lit. 'Azimuth, direction angle'); though no published usage is known. Herman Holmqvist also describes the symbol as Riktningsvinkel (lit. 'Direction angle') in a book about symbols published in 1964.

From that apparent beginning, the Angzarr was swept up into the Monotype typeset catalog of arrow characters; it was found in a 1963 Monotype typeset catalog of arrow characters, but not in an earlier 1954 edition of the same catalog. Monotype listed the symbol as matrix serial number S9576. A 1972 Monotype catalog for mathematical characters included the Angzarr under another serial number (S16139), though no reason is known for the change. It is unknown why Monotype added the character, or what purpose it was intended to serve.

In 1988, the International Organization for Standardization added the symbol to its Standard Generalized Markup Language (SGML) definition, apparently pulling it from the Monotype character set. The STIX Fonts project adopted the Angzarr symbol from the ISO's SGML characters.

In March 2000, the Angzarr symbol reached wide distribution when the Unicode Technical Committee, in collaboration with the STIX project, proposed adding it to ISO/IEC 10646, the ISO standard with which the Unicode Standard is synchronised. The Angzarr was proposed in the ISO working-group document Proposal for Encoding Additional Mathematical Symbols, although no specific purpose is listed for the symbol.

The Angzarr symbol gained notoriety in 2022 when a blogger wrote a post about his failed attempt to uncover the symbol's use and purpose. The blog was updated in 2023, confirming the appearance of Angzarr in a 1972 Monotype typeset catalogue with a scan of the page, and in 2024, confirming its appearance in earlier Monotype catalogues.

== See also ==
- List of Unicode characters
- Ghost characters – Erroneous kanji included in JIS X 0208
- Visually similar/related characters:
  - Arrow (symbol)
  - Right angle
  - Line chart – 📈, 📉
  - The chaos magic "Linking Sigil" = "LS" = "Ellis"
