= Nichi-Ran jiten =

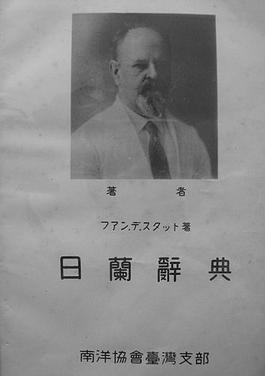
The title page with a portrait of P. A. van de Stadt

Nichi-Ran jiten (in Kyūjitai: 日蘭辭典) is a Japanese–Dutch dictionary compiled by Peter Adriaan van de Stadt and originally published by the Taiwanese branch of Nan'yō Kyōkai in 1934. It has about 33,800 entries. As of 2011, a second edition has not been published, but at least one facsimile edition was published in 1989 by the current Nan'yō Kyōkai, now based in Tokyo.

== History ==
While the Nichi-Ran jiten was published only in 1934, its compilation had already been finished in 1925. According to the preface, the compiler, Peter Adriaan van de Stadt, was approached in 1922 by the then Japanese consul general Matsumoto in Batavia (of the then Dutch East Indies, today Jakarta, Indonesia). Matsumoto had seen a Dutch-Japanese pocket dictionary by Van de Stadt (that had been published that same year) and asked Van de Stadt to compile a larger Japanese–Dutch dictionary. Van de Stadt agreed after some persuasion, and completed his work in 1925. However, when he offered the manuscript to the Nan'yō Kyōkai (the South Sea Association), they told him that the publication was too big a financial risk. Van de Stadt left the manuscript with Nan'yō Kyōkai. Only through the involvement of other parties, it was published nine years later, in 1934.

According to the book's colophon, the 1934 publication was by Nan'yō Kyōkai Taiwan shibu (Kyūjitai: 南洋協會臺灣支部), the branch of Nan'yō Kyōkai in Taiwan (then part of the Japanese Empire). Van de Stadt is acknowledged as the sole author. There never was a second edition. However, a facsimile edition was printed in 1989 by the current Nan'yō Kyōkai (Shinjitai: 南洋協会) based in Tokyo.

=== Historical context ===
Despite almost uninterrupted relations between Japan and the Netherlands dating back to 1640 and earlier, the Nichi-Ran jiten has been the only Japanese–Dutch Dictionary of at least medium size till 2006. On the other hand, efforts to compile a Dutch–Japanese dictionary date back to the period of Rangaku (the Japanese effort to learn about Western sciences through the Dutch) and lead to two major publications in Japan. The dictionary Haruma Wage (波留麻和解) was published in 1796–1799. The publication commonly known as the ‘Nagasaki Haruma' (長崎ハルマ) was presented to the Shōgun in 1833 and published 1855–1858. Both publications were based on François Halma's Woordenboek der Nederduitsche en Fransche Taalen [dictionary of the Dutch and French languages] (1729). However, when Japan was opened to other countries from 1854 on (with the Treaty of Peace and Amity), Rangaku became obsolete, and the attention of Japanese scholars switched from Dutch to English. The next medium size Dutch–Japanese dictionary was published almost 150 years later in 1994, by the Japanese publisher Kodansha.

== Features ==
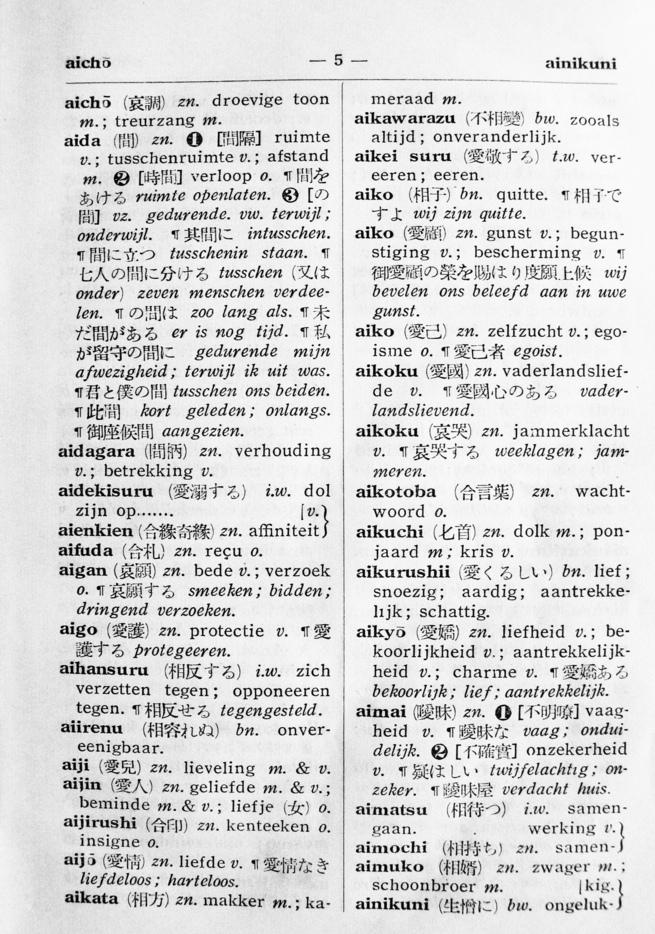
sample page

The dictionary contains about 33,800 entries. The entries are alphabetical and spelled in a version of modified Hepburn. Van de Stadt deviated from current usage of modified Hepburn by not using the apostrophe to indicate the long n (ん) before a vowel. Sometimes he ignored the special case of ん, other times he used a hyphen (for example, he spelled kon'ya for 今夜 but kon-yaku for 婚約).

The Latin spelling of the title word is followed by the Japanese spelling and equivalents or a definition in Dutch (both of course in prewar spelling). Example sentences follow directly the meaning for which they are relevant or are placed all at the end of the entry. Some examples show expressions in kanbun. Below is a text impression of the entry for aida. A photographic reproduction of a full page can be seen at the right.

aida (間) zn. (1) [間隔] ruimte v.; tusschenruimte v.; afstand m. (2) [時間] verloop o. ¶ 間をあける ruimte openlaten. (3) [の間] vz. gedurende; vw. terwijl; onderwijl. ¶ 其間に intusschen. ¶ 間に立つ tusschenin staan. ¶ 七人の間に分ける tusschen (又は onder) zeven menschen verdeelen. ¶ の間は zoo lang als. ¶ 私が留守の間に gedurende mijn afwezigheid; terwijl ik uit was. ¶ 君と僕の間 tusschen ons beiden. ¶ 此間 kort geleden; onlangs. ¶ 御座候間 aangezien

== Peter Adriaan van de Stadt ==
The compiler of the Japanese–Dutch dictionary Nichi-Ran jiten was Peter Adriaan van de Stadt (Arnhem March 9, 1876 – Batavia March 20, 1940). Van de Stadt was trained to be a government official at the University of Leiden (opleiding tot ambtenaar Chinese zaken [training for civil servant Chinese affairs] 1892–1895). In 1895 he went to the Dutch East Indies. With the exception of 8 years in service of a private company and 3 years of additional study (1915–1918) Van de Stadt worked as a civil servant. From 1918 on he was adviser for Japanese affairs, in which capacity he read and translated Japanese. He retired in 1932 when his position was abolished as a result of measures of economy (C. J. van de Stadt, 1951:165-166).

Van de Stadt was made officer of the Order of Orange-Nassau in 1910. Later he received the Order of the Rising Sun (1925) and the Legion of Honor (1928) as well. Van de Stadt also compiled the Chinese dictionary Hakka woordenboek, Batavia landsdrukkerij, The Hague, 1912 (ibid.).
