= The New Nelson Japanese-English Character Dictionary =

Book by Andrew Nelson

- Author: Andrew N. Nelson, John H. Haig
- Language: English-Japanese
- Subject: Japanese-English character dictionary
- Publisher: C. E. Tuttle Co.
- Publication date: 15 September 1997
- Publication place: United States of America
- Media type: Print
- Pages: 1616
- ISBN: 9780804820363
- Dewey Decimal: 495.6/321
- LC Class: PL679 .H33 1997

The New Nelson Japanese-English Character Dictionary (新版ネルソン漢英辞典, Shinpan Neruson Kan-Ei jiten) is a kanji dictionary published with English speakers in mind. It is an updated version of the original dictionary authored by Andrew N. Nelson, The Modern Reader's Japanese-English Character Dictionary. The primary change in the new version is the adoption of the traditional 214 Kangxi radicals as the dictionary's main indexing method. The dictionary also features two additional indices: the Universal Radical Index and the on-kun index.

The dictionary uses rōmaji throughout. On-yomi readings of the kanji are denoted by small caps and kun-yomi by italics. Okurigana are separated by parentheses.

The New Nelson contains about 7,000 entries, many of which are actually variant characters. Every character has index numbers into the Morohashi dictionary and the Japanese JIS X 0208 standard if they exist. All characters are prioritized by their Jōyō simplifications, however traditional forms are provided for every one. Non-standard simplifications are not included in the variants of a character, however those characters do point to the main entry.
