= Nihon Kingendaishi Jiten =

Japanese dictionary

Nihon Kingendaishi Jiten (日本近現代史辞典, "Dictionary of Modern and Present Japanese History") is a dictionary of contemporary Japanese history published in 1978, as the revision of Nihon Kindaishi Jiten (日本近代史辞典, "Dictionary of Japanese Modern History") of 1958. Both editions were published by Tôyô Keizai Shinpôsha (東洋経済新報社) and were edited by a committee organized by the Faculty of Letters at Kyoto University. The new edition: Nihon Kingendaishi Jiten has an extensive coverage of Japanese history from 1848 to 1975, with a particular focus on contemporary Japanese history.

Definitions of kindai (近代 "modern") and gendai (現代 "present") are complicated in Japanese history. While kindai generally begins in 1853 with Commodore Perry's first visit to Japan, it can also refer to a period beginning with the advent of Meiji Period in 1868. The end of kindai is generally agreed with the end of World War II in 1945. Gendai (現代 "present") follows kindai, referring to the postwar period from 1945 to present.

From popular culture to major historical events, Nihon Kingendaishi Jiten is notable for its extensive coverage of topics. Its appendix chart is extremely detailed in providing historical data since the Meiji period. Nihon Kingendaishi Jiten, as of 2006, is considered out of date, covering only the first 30 years of the postwar period, which has now extended to 60 years. For a more comprehensive coverage of the postwar period, Sengoshi Daijiten (戦後史大事典 "Encyclopedia of Postwar Japan") covers Japanese history from 1945 to 1990. The encyclopedia was published by Sanseido in 1991.

== Structure ==
=== Entries ===
Fields covered in the dictionary are politics, foreign affairs, military, economy, culture, society, and education. Within the fields covered, a total number of 3850 articles are written on organizations, systems, laws, events, social phenomena, and individuals. Articles are titled and written in contemporary Japanese syllabic writing. Cross-references to articles, and basic bibliographical references are provided at the end of each article.

=== Appendix ===
One third of the dictionary (about 300 pages) is dedicated to the appendix, which includes 55 tables and charts of supplementary information for the articles. Some of the major topics covered in the appendix include: a comprehensive chart of cabinet members, a list of diplomatic members from countries outside Japan, a list of mayors from the major prefectures, and the names of those who occupied prominent positions within the General Headquarters.

=== Index ===
A total number of 12,000 items are listed in the index at the end of the dictionary. In addition to the title of each article, relevant keywords and phrases within the articles are also included in the index.
