= Wordtank G50 =

The Wordtank G50 was the flagship model of the Wordtank line of Electronic Japanese dictionary by Canon before it was replaced by the Wordtank G55, which was again superseded in capability by the later G70 (though not replaced – it is still available as a cheaper alternative to the G70). It was introduced in May 2004.

== Features ==
The Wordtank G50 is a bidirectional electronic dictionary, integrating both Japanese-English (97,000 entries) and English-Japanese (270,000 entries) dictionaries. It also contains a standard Japanese dictionary (230,000 entries) and an abridged version of the Oxford English Dictionary (80,000 entries). In addition, there is a kanji dictionary (13,112 entries), with several thousand of the kanji having stroke order animations available. The G50 was the first electronic dictionary to feature stroke order animations, making it useful to students of the Japanese language who are learning kanji. The G50 also includes a katakana dictionary (52,000 entries), a Japanese reverse dictionary (230,000 entries), and an illustration dictionary (2,600 entries).

Although the G50's feature set, particularly its variety of dictionaries, is extensive, it lacks stylus input (which, on some models, allows kanji to be looked up by drawing them) and sound output (for pronunciation), which are available on some competing models. It also lacks any furigana help for kanji, this mean that if you want to translate a word from English to Japanese you will only get the translation in Chinese characters. No translation with Hiragana is extremely unhelpful for non-Japanese.

== Use ==
Although Canon only sells and supports its electronic dictionaries in Japan, the G50 has been exported (primarily by Japanese retailers) and sold to English-speaking students of the Japanese language around the world. The appeal of the G50 is that it can replace large paper volumes, including bidirectional dictionaries and kanji dictionaries, with a portable device, while also making the search process faster.

- Canon Wordtank Official Page (in Japanese)
- A comparison review of the Wordtank G50
