= Japanese dictionary =

Language version of dictionary

Japanese dictionaries (Japanese: 国語辞典, Hepburn: Kokugo jiten) have a history that began over 1300 years ago when Japanese Buddhist priests, who wanted to understand Chinese sutras, adapted Chinese character dictionaries. Present-day Japanese lexicographers are exploring computerized editing and electronic dictionaries. According to Nakao Keisuke (中尾啓介):

It has often been said that dictionary publishing in Japan is active and prosperous, that Japanese people are well provided for with reference tools, and that lexicography here, in practice as well as in research, has produced a number of valuable reference books together with voluminous academic studies. (1998:35)

After introducing some Japanese "dictionary" words, this article will discuss early and modern Japanese dictionaries, demarcated at the 1603 CE lexicographical sea-change from Nippo Jisho, the first bilingual Japanese–Portuguese dictionary. "Early" here will refer to lexicography during the Heian, Kamakura, and Muromachi periods (794–1573); and "modern" to Japanese dictionaries from the Edo or Tokugawa shogunate era (1603–1867) through the present.

== Lexicographical terminology ==
First, it will be useful to introduce some key Japanese terms for dictionaries and collation (ordering of entry words) that the following discussion will be using.

The Wiktionary uses the English word dictionary to define a few synonyms including lexicon, wordbook, vocabulary, thesaurus, and translating dictionary. It also uses dictionary to translate six Japanese words.

- jiten (辞典, lit. "word reference-work") "dictionary; lexicon; glossary"
- jiten (字典, lit. "character reference-work") "character dictionary"
- jiten (事典, lit. "thing reference-work") "encyclopedia, encyclopedic dictionary"
- jisho (辞書, lit. "word book") "dictionary; wordbook; lexicon; glossary"
- jisho (字書, lit. "character book") "character dictionary; dictionary"
- jibiki (字引, lit. "character pull/arrange) "character dictionary; dictionary"

The first three homophonous jiten compounds of ten (典 "reference work; dictionary; classic; canon; model") are Chinese loanwords. However, Chinese distinguishes their pronunciations, avoiding the potential ambiguities of Sino-Japanese jiten: cídiǎn 辞典 "word dictionary", zìdiǎn 字典 "character dictionary", or 事典 "encyclopedia". The usual Japanese word for "encyclopedia" is hyakka jiten (百科事典 "100/many subject dictionary", see Japanese encyclopedias). The jiten, jisho, and jibiki terms for dictionaries of kanji "Chinese characters" share the element ji (字 "character; graph; letter; script; writing").

Lexicographical collation is straightforward for romanized languages, and most dictionaries enter words in alphabetical order. In contrast, the Japanese writing system, with kanji, hiragana, and katakana, creates complications for dictionary ordering. University of Arizona professor Don C. Bailey (1960:4) discusses how Japanese lexicography differentiates semantic, graphic, and phonetic collation methods, namely:

- bunruitai (分類体 "classification form") "semantic collation; grouping words with similar meanings; thesaurus-like organization"
- jikeibiki (字形引き "character shape arrangement") "logographic collation; organizing kanji dictionaries by radicals (recurring graphic components)"
- onbiki (音引き "pronunciation arrangement") "phonetic collation; organization by the Japanese syllabary in iroha or gojūon ordering"

In general, jikeibiki organization is for a readers' dictionary, bunruitai for a writers' dictionary, and onbiki for both types.

The Japanese writing system originated with the introduction of Chinese characters around the 4th century CE, and early Japanese dictionaries developed from Chinese dictionaries circa the 7th century CE. These three Japanese collation systems were borrowed and adapted from Chinese character dictionaries.

The first, and oldest, Chinese system of collation by semantic field (for instance, "birds" or "fish") dates back to the c. 3rd century BCE Erya (爾雅). Only a few dictionaries like the Xiao Erya (小爾雅), Guangya (廣雅), and Piya (埤雅) used semantic collation. This system is inefficient looking up a word unless the dictionary user already knows its meaning; such as using Roget's Thesaurus without an alphabetical index. Bunruitai collation is obsolete among modern Japanese dictionaries, with the exception of thesauri.

The second system of dictionary collation by radicals (Chinese bushou, Japanese bushu, 部首 "section headers") originated with the 121 CE Shuowen Jiezi (說文解字) . Japanese dictionaries followed the Chinese example of reducing the number of radicals: original 540 (Shuowen Jiezi), adjusted 542 (Yupian (玉篇)), condensed 214 (Zihui (字彙), Kangxi Dictionary (康熙字典)), and abridged 189 (Xinhua Zidian (新华字典)). Japanese jikeibiki collation by radical and stroke ordering is standard for character dictionaries, and does not require a user to know the meaning or pronunciation beforehand.

The third Chinese system of ordering by pronunciation is evident in a rime dictionary, which collates the characters by tone and rime. The 601 CE Qieyun (切韻) is the oldest extant Chinese dictionary collated by pronunciation, and was expanded in the Guangyun (廣韻) and Jiyun (集韻) . The shortcoming of this unwieldy tone-rime method is that a user needs to know, or guess, the pronunciation of a character in order to look it up. The modern Chinese dictionary improvement is alphabetical collation by pinyin romanization. Japanese onbiki dictionaries historically changed from poetic iroha to practical gojūon ordering around 1890. Compare the former pangram poem (i-ro-ha-ni-ho-he-to, chi-ri-nu-ru-wo, ... "Although flowers glow with color, They are quickly fallen, ...) with the latter "fifty sounds" 10 consonants by 5 vowels grid (a-i-u-e-o, ka-ki-ku-ke-ko, ...).

== Early Japanese lexicography ==
The first Japanese dictionaries are no longer extant and only known by titles. For example, the Nihon Shoki (tr. Aston 1896:354) says Emperor Tenmu was presented a dictionary in 682 CE, the Niina (新字, "New Characters") with 44 fascicles (kan 巻). The earliest dictionaries made in Japan were not for the Japanese language but rather dictionaries of Chinese characters written in Chinese and annotated in Japanese.

Japanese lexicography flowered during the Heian period, when Chinese culture and Buddhism began to spread throughout Japan. During the Kamakura and Muromachi eras, despite advances in woodblock printing technology, there was a decline in lexicography that Bailey (1960:22) describes as "a tendency toward simplification and popularization".

The following review of the first published Japanese dictionaries is divided into the above lexicographical jikeibiki, bunruitai, and onbiki types.

=== Graphically organized dictionaries ===
Jikeibiki graphic collation began with the oldest extant Japanese dictionary: the c. 835 CE Tenrei Banshō Meigi (篆隷万象名義), edited by the Heian monk and scholar Kūkai. It enters approximately 1,000 characters under 534 radicals, and each entry gives the seal script character, Chinese fanqie reading, and definition (usually copied from the Yupian), but does not give native kun'yomi Japanese readings.

The first dictionary containing Japanese readings of kanji was the c. 900 Shinsen Jikyō (新撰字鏡), which the editor Shōjū (昌住) compiled from the Yupian and Qieyun. It enters 21,300 characters, giving both Chinese and Sino-Japanese readings, and cites many early Japanese texts. Internal organization innovatively combines jikeibiki and bunruitai methods; a simplified system of 160 radicals is ordered semantically (e.g., 5-7 are Rain, Air, and Wind).

The c. 1100 Buddhist Ruiju Myōgishō (類聚名義抄) dictionary lists over 32,000 characters and compounds under 120 radicals. The structure and definitions closely follow the Chinese Yupian and Qieyun. This Heian reference work gives both Sino-Japanese and Japanese readings for kanji, usually with Kanbun annotations in citations from Chinese classic texts.

The c. 1245 Jikyōshū (字鏡集) collates Chinese characters primarily by the 542 Yupian radicals and secondarily by semantic headings adapted from the Iroha Jiruishō. This Kamakura dictionary, edited by Sugawara no Tamenaga (菅原為長), exists in 3, 7, and 20 fascicle editions that have convoluted textual histories.

The next jikeibiki collated dictionary of kanji was the c. 1489 Wagokuhen (和玉篇). This "Japanese Yupian" was based on the Chinese Yupian, actually the 1013 Daguang yihui Yupian (大廣益會玉篇, "Expanded and Enlarged Yupian"), which was current in Muromachi Japan. The Wagokuhen went through dozens of editions, which collate entries through various systems of (from 100 to 542) radicals, without any overt semantic subdivisions.

Two historical aspects of these logographically arranged Japanese jikeibiki dictionaries are reducing the number of radicals and semantically ordering them. The radical systems ranged from 542 (the Yupian), 534, 160, 120, down to 100. Both the Shinsen Jikyō and Jikyōshū refined logographic categorization with bunruitai-type arrangements. While Chinese dictionaries have occasional examples of semantically ordered radicals (for instance, Kangxi radicals 38 and 39 are Woman and Child), Japanese lexicography restructured radicals into more easily memorable sequences.

=== Semantically organized dictionaries ===
Japanese bunruitai semantic collation of dictionaries began with the 938 CE Wamyō Ruijushō (倭名類聚鈔), compiled by Minamoto no Shitagō (源順). This Heian dictionary adapts the ancient Chinese Erya dictionary's 19 semantic categories into 24 Japanese headings with subheadings. For instance, Heaven and Earth is subdivided into Stars and Constellations, Clouds and Rain, Wind and Snow, etc. The character entries give source citations, Chinese pronunciations, definitions, and Japanese readings in the ancient Man'yōgana character system.

The c. 1444 Kagakushū (下学集) was an anonymous Muromachi era Japanese language dictionary or encyclopedia that defined some 3000 words into 18 semantic categories. It was designed for the literate public rather than for priests and literati, and was reissued many times.

=== Phonetically organized dictionaries ===
Japanese onbiki phonetic collation began during the late Heian Period. The circa 1144–1165 CE Iroha Jiruishō (色葉字類抄) was the first dictionary to group entries in the iroha order. Words are entered by 47 first kana syllables, each subdivided into 21 semantic groups.

The c. 1468 Setsuyōshū (節用集) was a popular Muromachi dictionary collated in iroha order and subdivided into 12 (later 13) semantic categories. It defined current Japanese vocabulary rather than borrowed Sino-Japanese compounds, and went through many editions and reprints.

The 1484 Onkochishinsho (温故知新書) was the first Japanese dictionary to collate words in gojūon rather than conventional iroha order. This Muromachi reference work enters about 13,000 words, first by pronunciation and then by 12 subject classifications.

All three of these onbiki dictionaries adapted the bunruitai method to collate primarily by first syllable and secondarily by semantic field. This is comparatively less efficient than modern Japanese dictionaries with single-sorting gojūon collation by first syllable, second syllable, etc.

== Modern Japanese lexicography ==
The development of early Japanese lexicography from Chinese–Japanese dictionaries has cross-linguistic parallels, for instance, early English language lexicography developed from Latin–English dictionaries. Nonetheless, modern Japanese lexicography adapted to an unparalleled second foreign wave from Western language dictionaries and romanization.

During the Nanban trade Period (1543–1650 CE) when Japan was opened to Europeans, the Jesuit Mission Press published two groundbreaking dictionaries. The 1598 monolingual Rakuyōshū (落葉集, "Collection of Fallen Leaves") gave Sino-Japanese and native Japanese readings of characters, and introduced the small raised circle (handakuten 半濁点) to indicate the p sound (compare ha は and pa ぱ). The 1603–1604 bilingual Japanese-Portuguese Nippo Jisho or Vocabvlario da Lingoa de Iapam dictionary is still cited as an authority for early Japanese pronunciation. The year 1604 was at the beginning of the Edo Period and also, as Nakao (1998:37) points out, the date of the first monolingual English dictionary, the Table Alphabeticall.

During the Sakoku Period (1641–1853) when Japan was closed to foreigners, with the exception of the Dutch East India Company, Rangaku ("Dutch/Western learning") influenced Japanese lexicography through bilingual Japanese and Dutch dictionaries. Another notable publication was the 1712 Wakan Sansai Zue (和漢三才図会) encyclopedia, which was based on the 1609 Chinese Sancai Tuhui (三才圖會).

=== Japanese language dictionaries ===
Kokugo jiten/jisho (国語辞典/辞書 "national language dictionary") means "Japanese–Japanese dictionary, monolingual Japanese dictionary". This "national language" term kokugo, which Chinese borrowed as guoyu, usually refers to the Japanese language as taught in Japanese schools. Nihongo jisho (日本語辞書 "Japanese language dictionary") is a neologism that contrasts Japanese with other world languages. There are hundreds of kokugo dictionaries in print, ranging from huge multivolume tomes to paperback abridgments. According to Japanese translator Tom Gally (1999:n.p.), "While all have shortcomings, the best kokugo dictionaries are probably among the best reference works in existence in any language."

The Edo Kokugaku scholar Tanikawa Kotosuga (ja:谷川士清, 1709–1776) began compilation of the first full-scale Japanese language dictionary, the Wakun no Shiori or Wakunkan (和訓栞 "Guidebook to Japanese Pronunciations"). This influential 9-volume dictionary of classical Japanese words was posthumously completed and finally published in 1887.

The first truly modern Japanese language dictionary was edited by the grammarian and English translator Ōtsuki Fumihiko (大槻文彦), who used Webster's Dictionary as the model for his pioneering Genkai (言海 "Sea of Words", 1889–1891). His revised 5-volume Daigenkai (大言海 "Great/Comprehensive Sea of Words", Fuzambō, 1932–1937) dictionary continues to be cited for its definitions and etymologies.

The Dainihon Kokugo Jiten (大日本國語辭典, Fuzambō, 1915–1919), edited by Matsui Kanji (松井簡治), contains 220,000 headwords, with detailed interpretations and almost complete source material.

The Daijiten (大辭典 "Great/Comprehensive Dictionary", Heibonsha 1934–1936), edited by Shimonaka Yasaburō (下中彌三郎), is the largest kokugo dictionary ever published. The original 26-volume edition, which is still available in condensed versions, entered over 700,000 headwords, listed by pronunciation, and covered a wide variety of Japanese vocabulary.

The Nihon Kokugo Daijiten (日本国語大辞典, Shogakukan, 1972–1976, 2nd ed. 2000–2002) is the successor to the Dainihon Kokugo Jiten. Matsui Shigekazu (松井栄一), who led the compilation of the dictionary, is the grandson of Matsui Kanji. This multivolume historical dictionary enters about 500,000 headwords, and is currently the most complete reference work for the Japanese language.

The bestselling kokugo titles are practical 1-volume dictionaries rather than encyclopedic works like the Nihon Kokugo Daijiten. For present purposes, they are divided between large-size dictionaries that enter 100,000–200,000 headwords on 2000–3000 pages and medium-size ones with 60,000–100,000 on 1300–1500 pages. The following discussion will introduce the central kokugo dictionaries, excepting the numerous smallest editions.

- The Kōjien (広辞苑 "Wide Garden of Words", Iwanami Shoten, 1955, 7th ed. 2018), edited by Shinmura Izuru (新村出), enters 200,000 headwords. This highly respected dictionary gives definitions in chronological order, which is useful for understanding diachronic semantics. Japanese newspaper editorials commonly cite Kōjien definitions as authoritative, but the following dictionaries are sometimes lexicographically superior.
- The Daijirin (大辞林 "Great Forest of Words", 1988, Sanseido, 4th ed. 2019), edited by Matsumura Akira (松村明), has 233,000 headwords. This highly evaluated rival of the Kōjien gives detailed definitions, and arranges word meanings with the most common ones first, instead of historical order.
- The Daijisen (大辞泉 "Great Fountainhead of Words", Shogakukan, 1995, 2nd ed. 2012), also edited by Matsumura Akira (above), has 220,000 entries, and is practically a twin of the Daijirin. Two minor improvements are color pictures instead of line art and replacing classical usage citations with contemporary ones.
- The Nihongo Daijiten (日本語大辞典 "Great Japanese Dictionary", Kōdansha, 1989, 2nd ed. 1995), edited by Umesao Tadao (梅棹忠夫), enters 175,000 headwords. It is distinguished by numerous color illustrations and occasional English translations.

The large size of these dictionaries provides comprehensive coverage of Japanese words, but also makes them difficult to carry and use.

Medium single-volume dictionaries have comparative advantages in portability, usability, and price.

- The Sanseido Kokugo Jiten (三省堂国語辞典 "Sanseido's Japanese Dictionary", Sanseido, 1960, 8th ed. 2021), edited by Kenbō Hidetoshi (見坊豪紀), has currently around 84,000 headwords (the first edition had about 57,000 headwords). It emphasizes contemporary usage and includes many colloquialisms.
- The Iwanami Kokugo Jiten (岩波国語辞典 "Iwanami's Japanese Dictionary", Iwanami Shoten, 1963, 8th ed. 2019), edited by Nishio Minoru (西尾実), has 57,000 headwords. It is marketed as a reliable authority.
- The Shin Meikai Kokugo Jiten (新明解国語辞典 "New Lucid Japanese Dictionary", Sanseido, 1972, 8th ed. 2020), edited by Yamada Tadao (山田忠雄), has currently around 79,000 entries. This popular and distinctive dictionary achieved notoriety from Akasegawa Genpei (赤瀬川原平)'s 1996 bestseller that listed many amusingly idiosyncratic definitions.
- The Meiji Shoin Seisen Kokugo Jiten (明治書院精選国語辞典 "Meiji Shoin's Selected Japanese Dictionary", 1972, new revised ed. 1998), edited by Miyaji Yutaka (宮地裕) and Kai Mutsurō (甲斐睦郎), has 50,000 headwords. It includes many uncommon features such as synonyms, antonyms, stroke orders, and JIS encoding.
- The Gendai Kokugo Reikai Jiten (現代国語例解辞典 "Modern Illustrated Japanese Dictionary", Shogakukan, 1985, 5th ed. 2016), edited by Hayashi Ōki (林巨樹), gives 69,000 entries, and includes numerous tables explaining Japanese usage.
- The Gakken Kokugo Daijiten (学研国語大辞典 "Gakken's Great Japanese Dictionary", Gakushū Kenkyūsha, 1978, 2nd ed. 1988), edited by Kindaichi Haruhiko (金田一春彦) and Ikeda Yasaburō (池田弥三郎), enters about 120,000 headwords. This was the first Japanese dictionary fully edited with computers, and give illustrative citations from over 350 published sources.

Some Japanese publishers sell both a larger dictionary with more archaisms and classical citations as well as a smaller condensation with more modern examples, for instance, Shogakukan's Daijisen and Gendai Kokugo Reikai Jiten.

=== Chinese character dictionaries ===
Kan-Wa jiten (漢和辞典 "Kan[ji] Chinese [character]-Wa Japanese dictionary") means "Japanese dictionary of kanji (Chinese characters)". This unique type of monolingual dictionary enters Japanese borrowings of kanji and multi-character compounds (jukugo 熟語), but is not a bilingual Chinese–Japanese dictionary. A Kan–Wa dictionary headword (oyaji 親字 "parent character") entry typically gives variant graphic forms, graphic etymology, readings, meanings, compounds, and idioms. Indexes usually include both radical-stroke and pronunciation (on and kun readings), and sometimes other character indexing systems like the four corner method.

The history of Kan–Wa dictionaries began with early Japanese references such as the Tenrei Banshō Meigi and Ruiju Myōgishō (above). In 1716, the Edo author of Yomihon, Tsuga Teishō (都賀庭鐘, 1718–1794) published the Kōki Jiten (康熙字典), a Japanese version of the Kangxi Dictionary, which standardized the Kan-Wa jiten system of 214 Kangxi radicals. The first dictionary titled with Kan-Wa was the Kan-Wa Daijiten (漢和大字典 "Great Kanji-Japanese Character Dictionary", Sanseido, 1903), edited by Shigeno Yasutsugu (重野安繹, 1827–1910), founder of the Shigaku zasshi. The Daijiten (大字典 "Great Character Dictionary", Kodansha, 1917), edited by Sakaeda Takei 栄田猛猪, went through numerous reprints.

The best available Kan–Wa dictionary is unquestionably Morohashi Tetsuji (諸橋轍次)'s 13-volume Dai Kan-Wa Jiten (大漢和辞典 "Great/Comprehensive Kanji–Japanese Dictionary", Taishukan, 1956–60), which contains over 50,000 characters and 530,000 compounds. It was condensed into the 4-volume Kō Kan-Wa Jiten (広漢和辞典 "Broad Kanji–Japanese Dictionary", Taishukan, 1982), edited by Morohashi, Kamata Tadashi (鎌田正), and Yoneyama Toratarō (米山寅太郎), which enters 20,000 characters and 120,000 compounds.

The following major Kan–Wa dictionaries are presented in the chronological order of their first editions. Note that the numbers of character headwords include variants.

- The Kan-Wa Daijiten (漢和大字典 "Great Kanji-Japanese Character Dictionary", Gakken, 1978), edited by Todo Akiyasu (藤堂明保), enters 20,000 headwords and 120,000 compounds.
- The Kadokawa Daijigen (角川大字源 "Kadokawa's Great Source of Characters", 1992), edited by Ozaki Yūjirō (尾崎雄二郎), gives 12,300 characters and 100,000 compounds.
- The Dai Kangorin (大漢語林 "Great Forest of Chinese", Taishukan, 1992), edited by Kamada Tadashi and Yoneyama Toratarō, includes 13,938 characters and 100,000 compounds.
- The Shin Daijiten (新大字典 "New Daijiten, Kōdansha, 1993), edited by Ueda Kazutoshi (上田万年), enters 21,094 characters and 110,000 compounds, and is a modern revision of the Daijiten.
- The Jitsū (字通 "Mastery of Characters", Heibonsha, 1996), edited by Shirakawa Shizuka (白川静), includes 9,500 characters and 22,000 compounds, collated by pronunciation in gojūon order. It combines two other Heibonsha dictionaries edited by Shirakawa, the etymological Jitō (字統, 1994) and the phonological Jikun (字訓, 1995).
- The Taishukan Gendai Kan-Wa Jiten (大修館現代漢和辞典 "Taishukan's Modern Kanji–Japanese Dictionary", 1996), edited by Kimura Shūji (木村秀次) and Kurosawa Hiromitsu (黒沢弘光), enters 7500 characters and 25,000 compounds.
- The Gojūon Biki Kan-Wa Jiten (五十音引き漢和辞典 "Kanji–Japanese Dictionary Indexed by the Fifty Sounds", Sanseido, 2004), edited by Okimori Takuya (沖森卓也), gives 6,300 characters and 30,000 compounds, collated by pronunciation (like the Jitsū) rather than radical.
- The Shinchō Nihongo Kanji Jiten (新潮日本語漢字辞典 "Shincho Japanese Kanji Dictionary", Shinchosha, 2007), gives 15,375 characters and 47,000 compounds.

Kan-Ei jiten (漢英辞典 "Kanji–English dictionary") refers to a character dictionary designed for English-speaking students of Japanese. An early example of, if not the prototype for, this type of dictionary is Arthur Rose-Innes' 1900 publication 3000 Chinese-Japanese Characters in Their Printed and Written Forms, issued in Yokohama. Reprinted in 1913, a revised and enlarged edition appeared in 1915 and that volume was reprinted by United States Government Printing Office in 1943. This work evidently expanded for the second edition of Rose-Innes' Beginners' Dictionary of Chinese-Japanese Characters with Common Abbreviations, Variants and Numerous Compounds appeared in 1927 and contained 5,000 characters. Far from being a hastily compiled wartime production, Rose-Innes' Beginners' Dictionary was an established work when reprinted during World War II―new editions having appeared in 1927, 1936, and 1942. Reprints of various editions were made in 1943, 1945, and 1950. A third edition appeared in 1953 and a fourth in 1959. Currently, an edition is kept in print by Dover Publications. However, the Beginner's Dictionary of Chinese-Japanese Characters (Harvard University Press, 1942, Dover reprint, 1977), edited by Arthur Rose-Innes is not the only one reprinted by Dover for it also reprinted the 1959 edition. A "new eighth edition" of the Beginner's Dictionary of Chinese-Japanese Characters appeared in Tokyo (the publisher was Meiseisha) in 1984. However, it has the same pagination of the 1959 edition, so, it may merely be a reprint. Another early English character dictionary is 六千字典 = 6000 Chinese Characters with Japanese Pronunciation and Japanese and English Renderings by J. Ira Jones and H.V.S. Peeke published in 1915 in Tokyo. The fourth edition of this work appeared in 1936.

There are currently four major Kan–Ei dictionaries.

- The Modern Reader's Japanese-English Character Dictionary (最新漢英辞典, Tuttle, 1962, 2nd ed. 1974), edited by Andrew Nelson and commonly called "Nelson's dictionary", enters a total of 5,446 characters (including variants) and 70,000 compounds. It is collated through an idiosyncratic "Radical Priority System" reorganization of the 214 Kangxi radicals.
- The Japanese Character Dictionary With Compound Lookup via Any Kanji (漢英熟語リバース字典, Nichigai, 1989), edited by Mark Spahn and Wolfgang Hadamitzky, lists 7,054 characters and nearly 47,000 compounds, collated under a simplified system of 79 radicals. This "reverse dictionary" cross-references compounds by their component characters; for instance, the ten 典 headword lists compounds including jiten (辞典"dictionary") under the second position, hyakka jiten (百科事典 "encyclopedia") under the fourth, etc.
- The New Japanese-English Character Dictionary (新漢英字典, Kenkyūsha, 1990, NTC reprint, 1993), edited by Jack Halpern, enters approximately 3,500 characters, emphasizing etymologies and historical semantics. Primary collation follows a "System of Kanji Indexing by Patterns" (SKIP), but pronunciation and radical indexes are provided. It was revised as The Kodansha Kanji Dictionary, (Kodansha, 2013), and its abridged Kodansha Kanji Learner's Dictionary.
- The New Nelson Japanese-English Character Dictionary (新版ネルソン漢英辞典, Tuttle, 1997), edited by John H. Haig, is a complete revision of Nelson's, and includes 7107 characters and 70,000 compounds. It employs a modified Kangxi system of 217 radicals, and has a 230-page "Universal Radical Index" that fully cross-references under each component radical. For example, tō or agari (騰 "gallop, prance; soar; rise up") is entered under radical 187 馬 "horse", but is also indexed under radicals 1 一 "one", 12 丷 or 八 "eight", 37 大 "big", and 130 月 "meat; moon".

It is noteworthy that all four of these Ei–Wa dictionaries attempted to improve upon the traditional radical system, which can be problematical for users, but none of their improvements has been widely accepted.

=== Japanese and English dictionaries ===
Since Japanese bilingual dictionaries, which are available for most major world languages, are too numerous to be discussed here, the two cases in point are Ei-Wa jiten (英和辞典) "English–Japanese dictionaries" and Wa-Ei jiten (和英辞典) "Japanese–English dictionaries".

First, the history of English–Japanese dictionaries began at the end of the Edo period. The English missionary Walter H. Medhurst, who never traveled to Japan, compiled the first bilingual wordbook An English and Japanese, and Japanese and English Vocabulary (Batavia, 1830). The Dutch translator Hori Tatsunosuke (堀達之助), who interpreted for Commodore Perry, compiled the first true English–Japanese dictionary: A Pocket Dictionary of the English and Japanese Language (英和対訳袖珍辞書, Yosho-Shirabedokoro, 1862). It was based upon English-Dutch and Dutch-Japanese bilingual dictionaries, and contained about 35,000 headwords.

English–Japanese dictionary publishing flourished during the Taishō period. Kanda Naibu (神田乃武) used the Century Dictionary as the basis for his Mohan [Model] English–Japanese Dictionary (模範英和大辞典, Sanseido, 1911). Saito's Idiomological [sic] English–Japanese Dictionary (熟語本位英和中辞典, Ōbunsha, 1915) was edited by Saitō Hidesaburō (斎藤秀三郎).Jūkichi Inouye (井上十吉), a graduate of London University, edited Inouye's English–Japanese Dictionary (井上和英大辞典, Shiseidō, 1921). Kenkyusha's New English–Japanese Dictionary on Bilingual Principles (研究社新英和大辞典, 1927) was edited by Okakura Yoshisaburō (岡倉由三郎).

In the present day, four major English–Japanese dictionaries are available.

- Iwanami's Comprehensive English–Japanese Dictionary (岩波英和大辞典, 1970), edited by Nakajima Fumio (中島文雄), has 110,000 headwords.
- Shogakukan Random House English–Japanese Dictionary (小学館ランダムハウス英和大辞典), 1973 edited by Katsuaki Horiuchi, 2nd ed. 1994 edited by Konishi Tomoshichi (小西友七), has 345,000 headwords and 175,000 usage examples.
- Taishukan's Unabridged Genius English–Japanese Dictionary (ジーニアス英和大辞典, 2001), edited by Konishi Tomoshichi (小西友七) and Minamide Kosei (南出康世), has 255,000 headwords (see Minamide 2002).
- Kenkyusha's New English–Japanese Dictionary (研究社新英和大辞典, 6th ed. 2002), edited by Takebayashi Shigeru (竹林滋), has 260,000 headwords.

Second, the history of Japanese–English dictionaries began towards the end of the Edo period. The American missionary James Curtis Hepburn edited A Japanese and English Dictionary with an English and Japanese Index (和英語林集成, Shanghai, American Presbyterian Press, 1867), with 20,722 Japanese-English and 10,030 English-Japanese words, on 702 pages. Although designed to be used by missionaries in Japan, this first Japanese–English dictionary was so popular among the Japanese that nine editions were published by 1910.

The history of English–Japanese dictionaries began with the arrival of HMS Phaeton, in order to better facilitate sakoku policy in the future due to the Nagasaki Harbour Incident. The Rangaku interpreter, Motoki Shōzaemon (本木庄左衛門), compiled the first Japanese English dictionary, purported to contain 6000 words in 1814 with the help of Dutch scholars in Japan titled "Angeria Gorintaisei" (諳厄利亞語林大成).

An Unabridged Japanese–English Dictionary, with copious illustrations (和英大辞典, Sanseido, 1896), edited by Frank Brinkley, Nanjō Bunyū (南条文雄) and Iwasaki Yukichika (岩崎行親), adapted and expanded Hepburn's dictionary into 1687 pages. It was primarily intended for English-speaking learners of Japanese. Jūkichi Inouye (井上十吉) also edited Inouye's Japanese–English Dictionary (井上英和大辞典, Sanseido, 1909), which was the first dictionary intended for Japanese learners of English. Takenobu Yoshitarō (武信由太郎) edited the authoritative Takenobu's Japanese–English Dictionary (武信和英大辞典, Kenkyusha, 1918), which had more coverage and better usage examples than any contemporary dictionaries. It was subsequently revised as Kenkyusha's New Japanese-English Dictionary (2nd ed. 1931) in order to compete with A Standard Japanese–English Dictionary (スタンダード和英大辭典, Taishukwan, 1924), edited by Takehara Tsuneta (竹原常太), with 57,000 headwords and 300,000 examples; and Saitō's Japanese–English Dictionary (和英大辭典, Nichi-Eisha, 1928), also edited by Saito Hidesaburo, with 50,000 headwords and 120,000 examples. Kenkyusha's mainstay dictionary is now in its fifth edition, with little contest.

- Grand Concise Japanese–English Dictionary (グランドコンサイス和英辞典, Sanseido, 2002), has 210,000 headwords and 110,000 usage examples.
- Kenkyusha's New Japanese-English Dictionary (新和英大辞典, 5th ed. 2003), edited by Watanabe Toshirō (渡邊敏郎), Edmund R. Skrzypczak, and Paul Snowden, has 480,000 headwords.

=== Specialized dictionaries ===
Senmon jiten (専門辞典) means "specialized dictionary" and senmon-go jiten (専門語辞典) means "jargon dictionary; technical dictionary". Since specialized Japanese dictionaries are too diverse and numerous to be covered here, four exemplary types are reviewed: dictionaries of old words, current words, loanwords, and thesauri. (See the bibliographies listed under "External links" below for more complete listings of specialized dictionaries.)

Kogo jiten (古語辞典) means "dictionary of Classical Japanese." Pre-modern or Classical Japanese can vary considerably from the modern language, and kogo dictionaries are essential for anyone reading historical texts.

- Kadokawa Kogo Daijiten (角川古語大辞典, 1982–1999, 5 vols.), ed. Nakamura Yukihiko, is the most comprehensive, with 80,000 classical words, including many proper names
- Jidaibetsu Kokugo Daijiten (時代別国語大辞典, Sanseido, 1967–2000, 5 vols.) has a total of 70,000 headwords, with diachronic distinctions in semantics
- Shogakukan Kogo Daijiten (小学館古語大辞典, 1994), ed. Nakada Norio, has 55,000 headwords compiled from the Nihon Kokugo Daijiten
- The Obunsha Kogo Jiten (旺文社古語辞典 "Obunsha's Classical Japanese Dictionary", 1960, 10th additional ed. 2015), edited by Matsumura Akira (松村明), has 43,500 headwords. The most famous and popular Classical Japanese dictionary in Japan. The first edition went on the market in 1960, a total of 11 million copies have been sold so far, in 2001 9th edition went on.
- The Obunsha Zenyaku Kogo Jiten (旺文社全訳古語辞典 "Obunsha's All Transrated Classical Japanese Dictionary", 1990, 4th ed. 2011), edited by Miyakoshi Ken (宮越賢), has 22,500 headwords. This dictionary is the first Classical Japanese dictionary adopted on the electronic dictionary in 2001.

Ryūkōgo jiten (流行語辞典) is a specialized wordbook of catchphrases and buzzwords. Japan, like most other countries, continually creates new and ephemeral terms. Three publishers put out annual paperback dictionaries that cover the latest native coinages and foreign borrowings.

- Gendai Yōgo no Kiso Chishiki (現代用語の基礎知識, Jiyū Kokuminsha, 1948-)
- Jōhō Chishiki Imidas (情報知識イミダス, IMIDAS [Innovative Multi-Information Dictionary, Annual Series], Shūeisha, 1987-)
- Chiezō (知恵蔵, Asahi Shinbunsha, 1990-)

Gairaigo jiten (外来語辞典) means "loanword dictionary". Beginning with Chinese borrowings, the Japanese language has imported many foreign loanwords and abbreviations. Below is a list of some renowned gairaigo dictionaries.

- Kihon Gairaigo Jiten (基本外来語辞典, Tōkyōdō, 1990), ed. Ishiwata Toshio
- Kankōchō no Katakanago Jiten (官公庁のカタカナ語辞典, Sanseido, 1994), ed. Shimokawabe Jun, 10,000 headwords
- Ryakugo Daijiten (略語大辞典, Maruzen, 2nd ed. 2002), ed. Kato Daisuke
- Konsaisu Katakanago Jiten (コンサイスカタカナ語辞典, Sanseido, 2004), 47,400 "katakana words" and 7,800 acronyms

Ruigo jiten (類語辞典) means "thesaurus," synonymous with Japanese ruigigo jiten (類義語辞典) and the English loanword shisōrasu (シソーラス).

- Kadokawa Ruigo Shin Jiten (角川類語新辞典, 1981), ed. Ōno Susumu, 49,000 entries
- Ruigo Dai Jiten (類語大辞典, Kodansha, 2002), ed. Shibata Takeshi, 76,000 entries
- Nihongo Dai Shisōrasu (日本語大シソーラス, Taishukan, 2003), ed. Yamaguchi Tsubasa, 200,000 entries
- Sanseido Ruigo Shin Jiten (三省堂類語新辞典, 2005), ed. Nakamura Akira, 50,000 entries

=== Electronic and online dictionaries ===
Denshi jisho (電子辞書) refers either generally to "dictionary software" (on CD-ROM, hard drive, onrain jisho オンライン辞書 "online dictionary", etc.) or specifically to "a dedicated PDA-type dictionary" also known as a denshi jiten (電子辞典).

The specific meaning of the "electronic Japanese dictionary" as "a handheld device" became popular in the early 1980s. Modern electronic dictionaries resemble a PDA or small clamshell computer. Different manufacturers and models offer various user features, input methods, and licensed content ranging from modern Japanese, classical Japanese, kanji, kotowaza, English (monolingual and bilingual), medical terminology, business terminology, and other specialized dictionaries; student models also have textbooks, exam prep content, and other study materials and multimedia integrated in-device.

The general denshi jisho meaning of "dictionary database software" has evolved from early floppies that Japanese users copied onto their local computers to web-based dictionaries accessible by users through the Internet. Japanese dictionary software is available in either freeware or commercial versions, online and offline.

Many online dictionaries of Japanese are based upon Jim Breen's voluntary EDICT (Japanese–English Dictionary) Project, which consists of the 170,000 entry-strong core JMdict (XML) and EDICT (text) files (under Creative Commons license), and associated files such as KANJIDIC for kanji. Eijirō, another major online database, is targeted primarily at native Japanese speakers, and as such lacks some of the features to make it more accessible to non-native speakers. Here are some major non-commercial online reference sites.

- Jim Breen's WWWJDIC, primary web interface for EDICT
- RomajiDesu, features EDICT-based dictionary, Japanese to Romaji/Kana/English translator, also includes KANJIDIC, KanjiVG, sample sentences, and Text to Speech.
- Denshi Jisho, features EDICT-based dictionary KANJIDIC, KanjiVG and sample sentences
- JLearn, features EDICT-based dictionary KANJIDIC, KanjiVG, sample sentences, conjugation tables and searching by conjugation
- Tanoshii Japanese, features EDICT-based dictionary, Text to Speech, KANJIDIC, KanjiVG and learning features
- POPjisyo Dictionary, pop-up definitions from EDICT
- Nihongodict, interactive interface for EDICT
- StudyJapanese.org, EDICT and Kanji dictionary in a learning environment
- Kiki's Kanji Dictionary, interface to search and browse EDICT
- FOKS Intelligent Dictionary Interface, FOKS (Forgiving Online Kanji Search) EDICT server with fuzzy searching
- SpaceALC, an online version of the Eijirō dictionary (Japanese)
- Honyaku Star, features many dictionaries and corpora such as EDICT, as well as original dictionaries.
- Nihongo Master Japanese Dictionary, Nihongo Master has English to Japanese search, related words and kanji, examples sentences, Kanji lookup by radical and Kanji stroke order animation. Fueled by EDICT, KANJIDIC and KanjiVG.

Commercial Japanese dictionary publishers (Sanseido, Shogakukan, Kenkyusha, Obunsha etc.) also sell CD-ROM versions of their print dictionaries, license dictionary content for electronic dictionaries, and host dictionary content for commercial apps, free dictionary aggregator sites (such as Goo Dictionary and Kotobank), and subscription services (such as Seiko's GIGANTES Cloud Dictionary and Kenkyusha Online Dictionary).

From these high-tech online reference works, the path of Japanese lexicography extends back to early Chinese character dictionaries compiled by Heian Buddhist priests.
