= Wagokuhen =

1489 Japanese dictionary of Chinese characters

The Wagokuhen or Wagyokuhen (倭玉篇; "Japanese Yupian") was a circa 1489 CE Japanese dictionary of Chinese characters. This early Muromachi period Japanization was based upon the circa 543 CE Chinese Yupian (玉篇 "Jade Chapters"), as available in the 1013 CE Daguang yihui Yupian (大廣益會玉篇; "Enlarged and Expanded Yupian"). The date and compiler of the Wagokuhen are uncertain. Since the oldest extant editions of 1489 and 1491 CE are from the Entoku era, that may approximate the time of original compilation. The title was later written 和玉篇 with the graphic variant wa 和 "harmony; Japan" for wa 倭 "dwarf; Japan".

Internal collation is through Chinese character radicals. Each head kanji entry gives katakana annotations for readings in on'yomi Sino-Japanese to the right and native kun'yomi Japanese below the character. There are few definitions and no entries for compounds. This format is similar with the Jikyōshū, except that the Wagokuhen does not semantically subdivide characters within a radical division.

The Wagokuhen was frequently revised and reprinted, for example, the Shūchin Wagokuhen (袖珍倭玉篇 "Pocket Edition Wagokuhen"). Scholars categorize over 51 editions by the number and arrangement of radicals. While the Yupian has a system of 542 radicals, different Wagokuhen editions have from 100 to 542. Bailey notes that the textual variations are usually divided into four types, depending upon the sequence of the first four radicals in the edition.

- Type 1: Those beginning with the radicals 日 (sun), 月 (moon), 肉 (flesh), 人 (person)
- Type 2: Those beginning with the radicals 金 (gold), 人 (person), 言 (speech), 心 (heart)
- Type 3: Those beginning with the radicals 一 (one), 上 (above), 示 (point), 二 (two)
- Type 4: Those beginning with the radicals 示 (point), 玉 (gem), 土 (earth), 田 (field)

The evidence shows that Type 1 was closest to the original Yupian, Type 2 was influenced by the Liao dynasty dictionary Longkan shoujian 龍龕手鑑 ("Hand Mirror for the Dragon Niche") with 242 radicals, Type 3 was by the expanded Daguang yihui Yupian, and Type 4 was also influenced by the Daguang and the Japanese Jikyōshū. The Wagokuhen was popular until the Edo period when Japanese dictionaries began to include compounds as well as individual characters.
