= Wordtank =

The Wordtank series is a line of Japanese electronic dictionaries manufactured by Canon. Although officially only sold in Japan, several of the multi-language models are popular among students of the Japanese language around the world. The ability to change menu display options to English on many of the Wordtank models is cited as a reason for the relatively wide foreign adoption. The ability to highlight an entire Japanese word (as opposed to just one character) and display a hiragana rendering of it is unique to the Wordtank series and is an extremely popular function for advanced learners. This function applies to all Wordtank models. One of the latest Wordtank models, the G70, offers this function for over 400,000 words.

== History ==
Canon has been manufacturing electronic dictionaries with the "WordTank" name since the late 1980s. Some series were better than others for the non-Japanese user (the mid-nineties IDX series was more usable than models from five years later; later series around 2004-5 are again improved).

ID series – Wordtank

- ID-7000
- ID-7100
- ID-7200 – popular in 1991/92
- ID-8500

ID series expansion cards

- ID-110 Business Conversation Card
- ID-120 Onomancy/Fortune Telling Card
- ID-130 English Conversation/Travel Card
- ID-140 Japanese Definitions Card – for the ID-7000/ID-7100
- ID-150 English/Japanese Dictionary Expansion Card – for ID-7000/ID-7100 (ID-7100 + ID-140 + ID-150 = ID-7200, but cost more)
- ID-160 English Conversation/Business Card
- ID-170 Contemporary Phrases Card
- ID-180 Game of "Go"
- ID-310 English/Japanese Dictionary Expansion Card – for the ID-7200 and ID-8500

IDX series – WORDTANK SUPER

- IDX-6500 – circa 1993–1999 – ROM 16 Mbit
- IDX-7500 – circa 1993–1999
- IDX-9500 – circa 1993–1999 – "64Mbits" – with two card slots. Probably the number one Japanese/English dictionary for non-Japanese during the 1990s.

later:

- IDX-9600 – ROM 68 Mbit
- IDX-9700

IDX series expansion cards

- IDX-510 国語辞典意味カード for IDX-7500, IDX-6500 (built into IDX-9500)
- IDX-520 英和辞典拡張カード for IDX-7500, IDX-6500 (built into IDX-9500)
- IDX-530 国語用例時点/漢和拡張カード for IDX-7500, IDX-6500 (built into IDX-9500)
- IDX-540 英和辞典拡張カード for IDX-7500, IDX-6500 (built into IDX-9500)
- IDX-550 ビジネス用語辞典カード for IDX-7500, IDX-6500 (built into IDX-9500)
- IDX-560 現代用語辞典カード for IDX-9500, IDX-7500, IDX-6500
- IDX-570 トラベル英会話カード for IDX-9500, IDX-7500, IDX-6500

IDC series

- IDC-300
- IDC-310

IDF series – Wordtank Super

- IDF-1000
- IDF-2000E
- IDF-2100
- IDF-2100SP
- IDF-2100VP
- IDF-2200E
- IDF-3000
- IDF-4000
- IDF-4000J
- IDF-4100
- IDF-4500
- IDF-4600

IDJ series

- IDJ-8000 – late 1990s
- IDJ-9000 – late 1990s – smaller display than the IDX-9500, similar dictionaries, but much larger set of kanji compounds (110000 vs 35000)

IDP series

- IDP-50
- IDP-600C
- IDP-600E
- IDP-600J

C series

- C30 – Japanese high school focused
- C35 – Japanese high school focused
- C50
- C55

G series

- G50 – English/Japanese
- G55 – English/Japanese
- G70 – English/Japanese
- G90 – Chinese/English/Japanese

V series (with voice features)

- V30 – Japanese high school focused
- V35 – Japanese high school focused
- V300 – Japanese high school focused
- V70 – Chinese/English/Japanese
- V80 – Chinese/English/Japanese
- V90 – Chinese/English/Japanese
- V903 – Chinese/English/Japanese

M series (with voice features)

- M300 – Japanese high school focused

== See also ==
- Wordtank G50
