= Andrew Nelson (lexicographer) =

American lexicographer

- Born: December 23, 1893; Great Falls, Montana
- Died: May 17, 1975 (aged 81); Hong Kong
- Occupation: Lexicographer
- Known for: Missionary

Academic background
- Education: Walla Walla University
- Alma mater: University of Washington
- Thesis: 'The origin, history, and present status of the temples of Japan' (1938)

Academic work
- Discipline: Lexicography
- Sub-discipline: East Asian languages and literature
- Institutions: Seventh-day Adventist missions
- Notable works: The Modern Reader's Japanese-English Character Dictionary

Andrew Nathaniel Nelson (December 23, 1893 – May 17, 1975) was an American missionary and scholar of East Asian languages and literature, best known for his work in Japanese lexicography.

== Biography ==
He was born in Great Falls, Montana to Swedish immigrant parents and earned his B.A. from Walla Walla University. In 1918, he began his long career of service in the Seventh-day Adventist missions of East Asia, where he gained particular distinction in the fields of general education and language training. The University of Washington awarded Nelson a Ph.D. in 1938 for his dissertation on The origin, history, and present status of the temples of Japan.

After retiring from missionary work in 1961, he was preoccupied with placing the finishing touches on his masterpiece, The Modern Reader's Japanese-English Character Dictionary, which first appeared in print the following year. The work, which was posthumously revised and expanded by a team led by John H. Haig at the University of Hawaii at Manoa, was reissued in 1997 as The New Nelson Japanese-English Character Dictionary; however, many scholars, teachers, and students continue to use the original edition of Nelson's dictionary, which has remained in print, because of changes made in Haig's edition that are viewed as impairing the functionality of the work. It is one of the most authoritative Kanji dictionaries for English learners of the language, and displays particular sensitivity to the difficulties they may have with the Kangxi radical system traditionally used to classify Kanji.

Nelson died in Hong Kong.

== Administrator ==
=== Philippine Union College ===
While President of Philippine Union College, Nelson also served as a chaplain at the New Bilibid Prison. On January 19, 1951, he provided pastoral support for the fourteen executed that day, thirteen of them were part of the Nakamura Case.

=== Founded Mountain View College ===
Nelson describes the founding of Mountain View College in a report published in the March 17, 1953, Youth's Instructor. They established a list of criteria based on the values of Adventist Education and then explored the vast territory of the South Philippines looking for land which met the criteria.

== Works ==
- Nelson's Kanji Dictionary

== See also ==
- Dwight Nelson
- Seventh-day Adventist Church
- Seventh-day Adventist theology
- Seventh-day Adventist eschatology
- History of the Seventh-day Adventist Church
- Teachings of Ellen G. White
- Inspiration of Ellen G. White
- Prophecy in the Seventh-day Adventist Church
- Investigative judgment
- Pillars of Adventism
- Second Coming
- Conditional Immortality
- Historicism
- Three Angels' Messages
- Sabbath in seventh-day churches
- Ellen G. White
- Adventism
- Seventh-day Adventist Church Pioneers
- Seventh-day Adventist worship
