= Eijirō =

- Original author(s): Electronic Dictionary Project
- Initial release: before April 1998
- Stable release: Ver. 159 / January 15, 2020; 5 years ago
- Written in: Plain text (Shift JIS) / PDIC
- Type: Reference software
- License: Proprietary commercial software
- Website: www.eijiro.jp

Eijirō (英辞郎) is a large database of English–Japanese translations. It is developed by the editors of the Electronic Dictionary Project and aimed at translators. Although the contents are technically the same, EDP refers to the accompanying Japanese–English database as Waeijirō (和英辞郎).

== History ==
The Eijirō project was started by an anonymous Japanese translator. Noting the favorable reception it received when he shared it with his friends, he started the Electronic Dictionary Project, a wiki-like structure that allowed for and even encouraged contributions to the dictionary. This resulted in a comprehensive database that grew to include over 1.66 million entries in the fourth edition.

== Characteristics ==
Although commonly termed a dictionary, Eijirō differs from other Japanese dictionaries such as the Kōjien by not distinguishing examples from definitions.

== Access ==
Eijirō can be purchased online as either a CD-R or downloadable dictionary file for a comparatively low price. Eijirō was also released from SpaceALC in 2002, and the SpaceALC version has since gone through eight revisions as of 2016.

In addition, an online version of Eijirō is provided free of charge through the SpaceALC Japanese portal.

== External links and references ==
- Eijirō Homepage (in Japanese)
  - What is Eijirō? (in Japanese)
- SpaceALC (in Japanese) – a portal site which includes an online dictionary based on Eijirō.
  - Pocket Eijirō (in Japanese)
- The Story Behind Eijiro – A first-hand blog entry outlining the history of Eijirō
