= The Modern Reader's Japanese–English Character Dictionary =

Book by Andrew Nelson

- Author: Andrew N. Nelson
- Language: English–Japanese
- Subject: Japanese–English character dictionary
- Publisher: C. E. Tuttle Co.
- Publication date: 1962
- Publication place: Japan, United States of America
- Media type: Print
- Pages: 1048
- Awards: 1969 Prize for the Society for the Promotion of International Cultural Relations (Kokusai Bunka Shinkōkai)
- LC Class: PL679 .N4

The Modern Reader's Japanese–English Character Dictionary (最新漢英辞典, Saishin Kan-Ei jiten) is a kanji dictionary published with English speakers in mind. Although a revised edition by John H. Haig, The New Nelson Japanese-English Character Dictionary, was published in 1997, it is still in print, now under the title The Original Modern Reader's Japanese-English Character Dictionary – Classic Edition

The dictionary contains about 5,000 entries, listing characters with their on and kun readings, compounds and English definitions. The entries are arranged by a system devised by the author as an extension of the traditional radical system.
