= Shinsen Jikyō =

c. 898-901 Japanese dictionary of Chinese

The Shinsen Jikyō (新撰字鏡; "Newly Compiled Mirror of Characters") is the first Japanese dictionary containing native kun'yomi "Japanese readings" of Chinese characters. The title is also written 新選字鏡 with the graphic variant sen (選 "choose; select; elect") for sen (撰 "compile; compose; edit").

The Heian Period Buddhist monk Shōjū (昌住) completed the Shinsen Jikyō during the Shōtai era (898-901 CE). The preface explains that his motivation for compiling a Japanese dictionary was the inconvenience of looking up Chinese characters in the Tang dynasty dictionary by Xuan Ying (玄應), the Yiqiejing yinyi ("Pronunciation and Meaning in the Tripitaka"). The preface credits two other Chinese dictionaries: the (ca. 543 CE) Yupian, which enters 12,158 characters under a system of 542 radicals (bùshǒu 部首), and the (601 CE) Qieyun rime dictionary, which enters 16,917 characters categorized by tones and syllable rimes. Don C. Bailey says:

In general, the Shinsen Jikyō resembles the [Yupian], but Shōjū specifically states in the preface that he acquired a copy of this work only in 892 after he had completed his first draft, and that he thereafter used it as supplementary material. Whether or not the format of the [Yupian] was imitated, a dictionary or dictionaries of the same type must have served as a model.

Shōjū's model balances two traditional methods of collating Chinese dictionaries: semantic organization like the Erya and logographic radicals like the Shuowen Jiezi. He introduces a novel Japanese system of 160 radicals (bu 部) that exhibit semantic organization. For example, the first seven are Heaven (天), Sun (日), Moon (月), Meat (肉, a graphic variant of 月), Rain (雨), Air (气), and Wind (風). The Shinsen Jikyō not only reduced the number of radical headings, but also logically arranged them by meanings. Compare the earlier Japanese dictionary Tenrei Banshō Meigi that uses 534 radicals adapted from the original 540 in the Shuowen Jiezi.

The received edition Shinsen Jikyō dictionary contains 21,300 character entries in 12 fascicles (kan 卷). Each head entry gives the Chinese character, Chinese pronunciations (with either a homonym or fanqie spelling), definitions, and Japanese equivalents (Wakun 和訓). This dictionary notes over 3,700 Japanese pronunciations, and cites early texts, for instance, the circa 822 CE Buddhist Nihon Ryōiki (日本霊異記 "Accounts of Miracles in Japan"). The Shinsen Jikyō is the first Japanese dictionary to include kokuji "national characters" invented in Japan. The modern Mojikyo computer font software includes character data from the ancient Shinsen Jikyō and Jikyōshū.

Shinsen Jikyō is the last Early Middle Japanese text to preserve any kind of Jōdai Tokushu Kanazukai, where the distinction is only made between type A and type B ko.
