= Iroha Jiruishō =

12th-century Japanese Kanji dictionary

The Iroha Jiruishō (色葉字類抄 or 伊呂波字類抄; "Characters classified in iroha order and annotated") is a 12th-century Japanese dictionary of Kanji ("Chinese characters"). It was the first Heian Period dictionary to collate characters by pronunciation (in the iroha order) rather than by logographic radical (like the Tenrei Banshō Meigi) or word meaning (Wamyō Ruijushō).

The Iroha Jiruishō has a complex history (see Okimori 1996:8-11) involving editions of two, three, and ten fascicles (kan 卷 "scroll; volume"). The original 2-fascicle edition was compiled by an unknown editor in late Heian era circa 1144-1165 CE. This was followed by a 3-fascicle edition by Tachibana Tadakane (橘忠兼) circa 1177-1188. Finally, at the start of the Kamakura Period, another anonymous editor compiled the expanded 10-fascicle edition, entitled 伊呂波字類抄 (with Iroha written 伊呂波 instead of 色葉).

The main character entries are annotated with katakana to indicate both on'yomi Sino-Japanese borrowings and kun'yomi native Japanese pronunciations. The Iroha Jiruishō orthography shows that 12th-century Japanese continued to phonetically distinguish voiceless and voiced sounds, but the distinction between /zi/ and /di/, /zu/ and /du/, and /eu/ and /ou/ was being lost. These entry words typify the Japanized version of classical Chinese known as hentai Kanbun (変体漢文 "anomalous Chinese writing", see Azuma Kagami) or Wakan konkōbun (和漢混交文 "mixed Japanese and Chinese writing"). This is a bilingual dictionary for looking up Chinese characters in terms of their Japanese pronunciation, and not a true Japanese language dictionary.

The Iroha jiruishō inventively groups entries by their first mora into 47 phonetic sections (部門) like i (伊), ro (呂), and ha (波); each subdivided into 21 semantic headings shown in the table below.

Classified headings in the Iroha jiruishō
Heading	Rōmaji	Kanji	Subject
1	Tenshō	天象	astronomical phenomena, seasons
2	Chigi	地儀	geographical features, dwellings
3	Shokubutsu	植物	trees, plants
4	Dōbutsu	動物	animals
5	Jinrin	人倫	human relations, moral questions
6	Jintai	人体	human anatomy, body parts
7	Jinji	人事	human affairs
8	Inshoku	飲食	foods, drinks
9	Zatsubutsu	雑物	miscellaneous things
10	Kōsai	光彩	colors, brilliance
11	Hōgaku	方角	directions, points of the compass
12	Inzū	員数	numbers
13	Jiji	辞字	miscellaneous 1-character words
14	Jūten	重点	reduplicative compounds
15	Jōji	畳字	synonym compounds
16	Shosha	諸社	shrines (Shintō)
17	Shoji	諸寺	temples (Buddhist)
18	Kokugun	国郡	administrative and political divisions
19	Kanshoku	官職	official titles and ranks
20	Seishi	姓氏	surnames, clan names
21	Myōji	名字	names

Most of these 21 headings are self-explanatory semantic fields, with the exceptions of 13 Jiji for miscellaneous words written with a single character, 14 Jūten reduplicative compounds (e.g., ji-ji 時時, literally "time time", "at times, occasionally"), and 15 Jōji synonym compounds (e.g., kanryaku 簡略, literally "simple simple", "simplicity, conciseness"). These 21 Iroha jiruishō headings can be compared with the 24 used two centuries earlier in the Wamyō Ruijushō.

Unlike all the other major Heian Japanese dictionaries that followed Chinese dictionary traditions, the Iroha Jiruishō's phonetic ordering can undoubtedly be interpreted, says Don C. Bailey (1960:16), "as a sign of increasing independence from Chinese cultural influences." Most subsequent Japanese dictionaries, excepting kanji ones, were internally organized by pronunciation.
