= Setsuyōshū =

The Setsuyō-shū or Setchō-shū (節用集; "Economical Collection" or "Collection [of words] for Everyday Use") was a popular Muromachi period Japanese dictionary collated in iroha order and subdivided into semantic categories. The title word setsuyō means "reduce usage; economize" and alludes to the Lunyu (compare the Kagakushū). "Confucius said: 'If you would govern a state of a thousand chariots (a small-to-middle-size state), you must pay strict attention to business, be true to your word, be economical in expenditure and love the people'.

The origins of the Setsuyōshū are unclear. The oldest extant edition is dated 1496 CE, and the text was probably compiled shortly before the Bunmei era (1469–1487 CE). Despite much speculation about the dictionary's anonymous author, Bailey concludes "a nameless fifteenth-century Zen priest is the likeliest candidate".

Unlike many early Japanese dictionaries of Chinese characters that were intended for literati, the Setsuyōshū was a true Japanese language dictionary and entered vocabulary current in Muromachi times. Each main entry gives the word in kanji (Chinese characters), notes Japanese pronunciation in katakana on the right, and occasionally adds etymologies and comments on the bottom.

There are numerous Setsuyōshū editions (over 180 from the Edo period) and many vary in content and format. Most versions collate words according to their first syllable under 43–47 iroha divisions (bu 部) with 9–16 semantic subdivisions (mon 門), which usually begin with "Heaven and Earth" (Tenchi 天地) and end with "Unclassified words" (Genji 言辞). This arrangement combines both Iroha Jiruishō phonetic ordering and Kagakushū semantic classifications.

The Japanese linguist Hashimoto Shinkichi analyzed differences among early Setsuyōshū editions and found three categories, distinguished by the first word beginning with i- appearing under the first '"Heaven and Earth" heading. The dictionaries' initial word is either Ise (伊勢 "old name for Mie Prefecture"), Indo (印度 "India"), or inui (乾 "northwest"). "Ise editions" have few appendices, put place names near the beginning of subject headings, and are probably the oldest redaction. "Indo editions" have many appendices, including place names, and clearly have been supplemented from the 1444 CE Kagakushū. "Inui editions" are usually printed with movable type, have more entries and corrections, and are the newest version.

Setsuyōshū has a parallel with Webster's informally meaning "English language dictionary". Nakao notes this dictionary "remained popular for so long that the name Setsuyoshu was used as a generic term for Japanese dictionaries (with the entries arranged in the order of iroha)".
