= Wamyō Ruijushō =

Japanese dictionary of Chinese characters

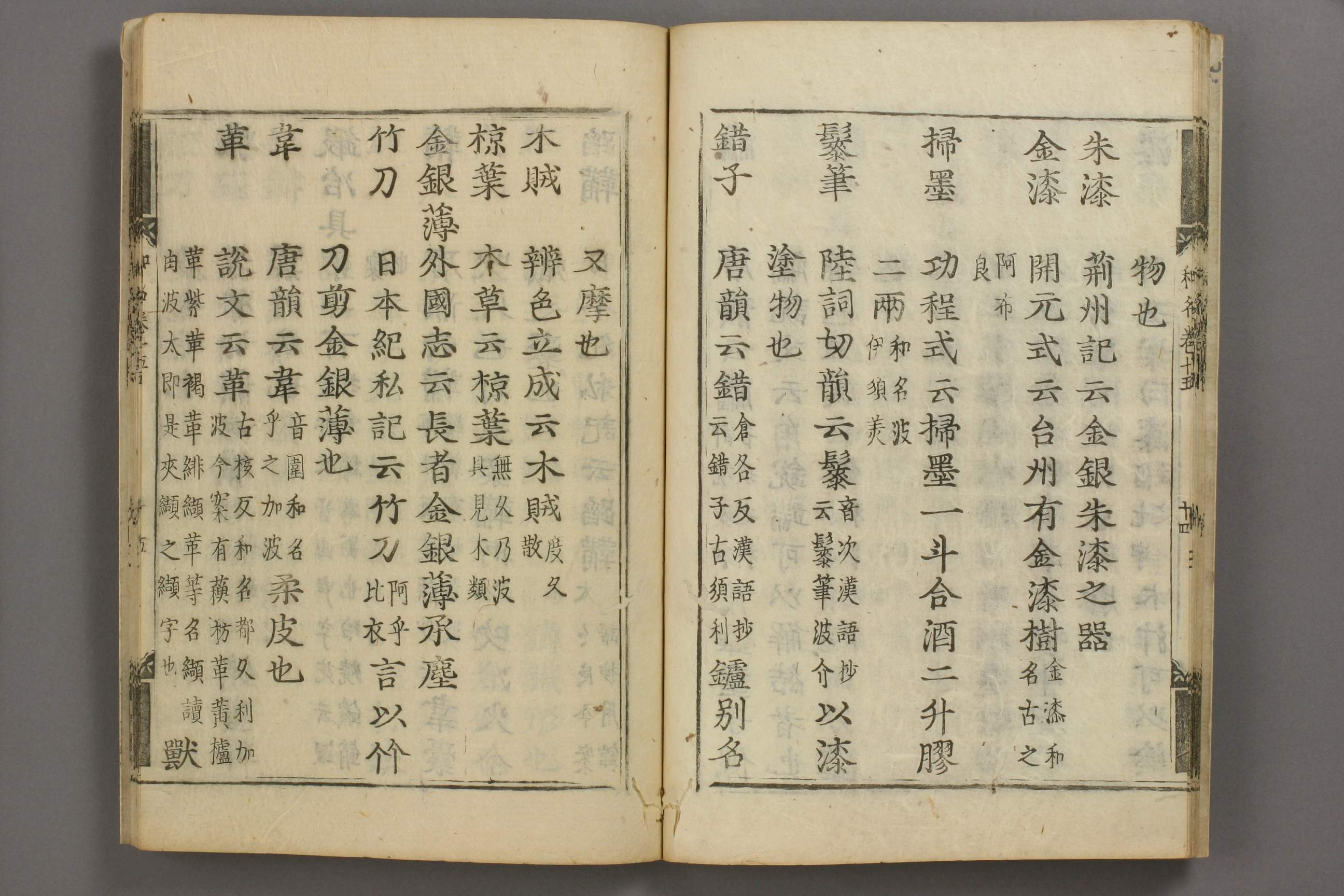

The Wamyō ruijushō or Wamyō ruijūshō (和名類聚抄; "Japanese names [for things], classified and annotated") is a 938 CE Japanese dictionary of Chinese characters. Heian period scholar Minamoto no Shitagō (源順, 911–983 CE) began compilation in 934, at the request of Emperor Daigo's daughter. The title is abbreviated as Wamyōshō (和名抄), and is also spelled 倭名類聚抄 (with wa 倭 "dwarf; Japan" for wa 和 "harmony; Japan") and 倭名類聚鈔 (with shō 鈔 "copy; summarize" for shō 抄 "copy; annotate").

The Wamyō ruijushō is the oldest extant Japanese dictionary organized into semantic headings, analogous to a Western language thesaurus. This ancient lexicographical collation system was developed in Chinese dictionaries like the Erya, Xiao Erya, and Shiming. The Wamyōshō categorizes kanji vocabulary, primarily nouns, into main headings (bu 部) divided into subheadings (rui 類). For instance, the tenchi (天地 "heaven and earth") heading includes eight semantic divisions like seishuku (星宿 "stars and constellations"), un'u (雲雨 "clouds and rain"), and fūsetsu (風雪 "wind and snow").

Each dictionary entry gives the Chinese character, sources cited, Chinese pronunciations (with either a homonym or fanqie spelling), definitions, and corresponding Japanese readings (in the ancient Man'yōgana system using kanji to represent Japanese pronunciation). It cites over 290 sources, both Chinese (for example, the Shuowen Jiezi) and Japanese (the Man'yōshū).

The Wamyō ruijushō, survives in both a 10-volume edition (十巻本) and a 20-volume edition (二十巻本). The larger one was published in 1617 with a commentary by Nawa Dōen (那波道円, 1595–1648) and was used in the Edo period until the 1883 publication of the 10-volume edition annotated by Kariya Ekisai (狩谷棭齋, 1775–1835), also known as the Senchū Wamyō ruijushō (箋注倭名類聚抄 "Annotated commentary to the Wamyō ruijushō"). The 10-volume edition has 24 main headings divided into a total of 128 subheadings, while the 20-volume version has 32 and 249, respectively. The table below illustrates how words are semantically categorized in the 10-volume edition.

Subject headings in the 1883 Wamyō ruijushō
	Rōmaji	Kanji	Translation	Subjects
1	Tenchi	天地	Universe	constellations, weather, gods, earth, topography
2	Jinrin	人倫	Humans	gender, kinship, family, marriage
3	Keitai	形体	Body	body parts, sense organs, internal organs
4	Shippei	疾病	Sickness	diseases, wounds
5	Jutsugei	術藝	Arts	martial arts, fine arts, skills
6	Kyosho	居處	Architecture	houses, walls, doors, roads
7	Sensha	舟車	Vehicles	boats, carts, carriages
8	Chinpō	珍寶	Treasures	precious metals, jewels
9	Fuhaku	布帛	Textiles	embroidery, silks, woven fabrics
10	Shōzoku	装束	Clothing	hats, clothes, belts, shoes
11	Inshoku	飲食	Foods and Drinks	liquors, beverages, cooked grains, fruits, meats
12	Kibei	器皿	Utensils	objects of metal, lacquer, wood, tile, and bamboo
13	Tōka	燈火	Illumination	lamps, lights, lighting
14	Chōdo	調度	Things and Supplies	implements, tools, weapons, utensils, furnishings
15	Uzoku	羽族	Birds	birds, feathers, ornithology
16	Mōgun	毛群	Wild Animals	wild animals, body parts
17	Gyūba	牛馬	Domestic Animals	cattle, horses, sheep, body parts, diseases
18	Ryōgo	龍魚	Aquatic animals	dragons, fish, reptiles, amphibians
19	Kibai	龜貝	Shellfishes	turtles, shellfish
20	Chūchi	蟲豸	Miscellaneous Animals	insects, worms, small reptiles
21	Tōkoku	稲穀	Grains	rices, cereals
22	Saiso	菜蔬	Vegetables	tubers, seaweeds, edible plants
23	Kayu	果蓏	Fruits	fruits, melons
24	Sōmoku	草木	Plants	grasses, mosses, vines, flowers, trees

The broadly inclusive Wamyō ruijushō dictionary was an antecedent for Japanese encyclopedias. In the present day, it provides linguists and historians with an invaluable record of the Japanese language over a thousand years ago, more specifically the linguistics of the 10th century and Heian period.
