= Yupian =

Chinese dictionary

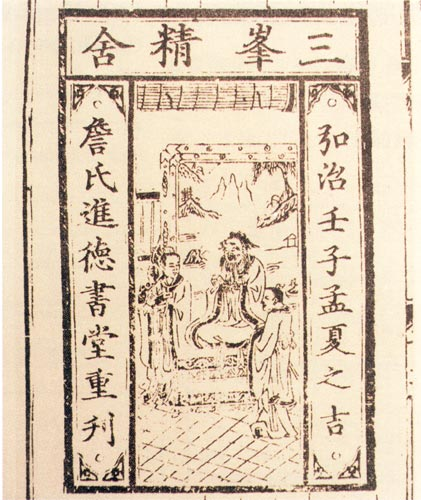
Ming dynasty 1492 reprint of the Yupian

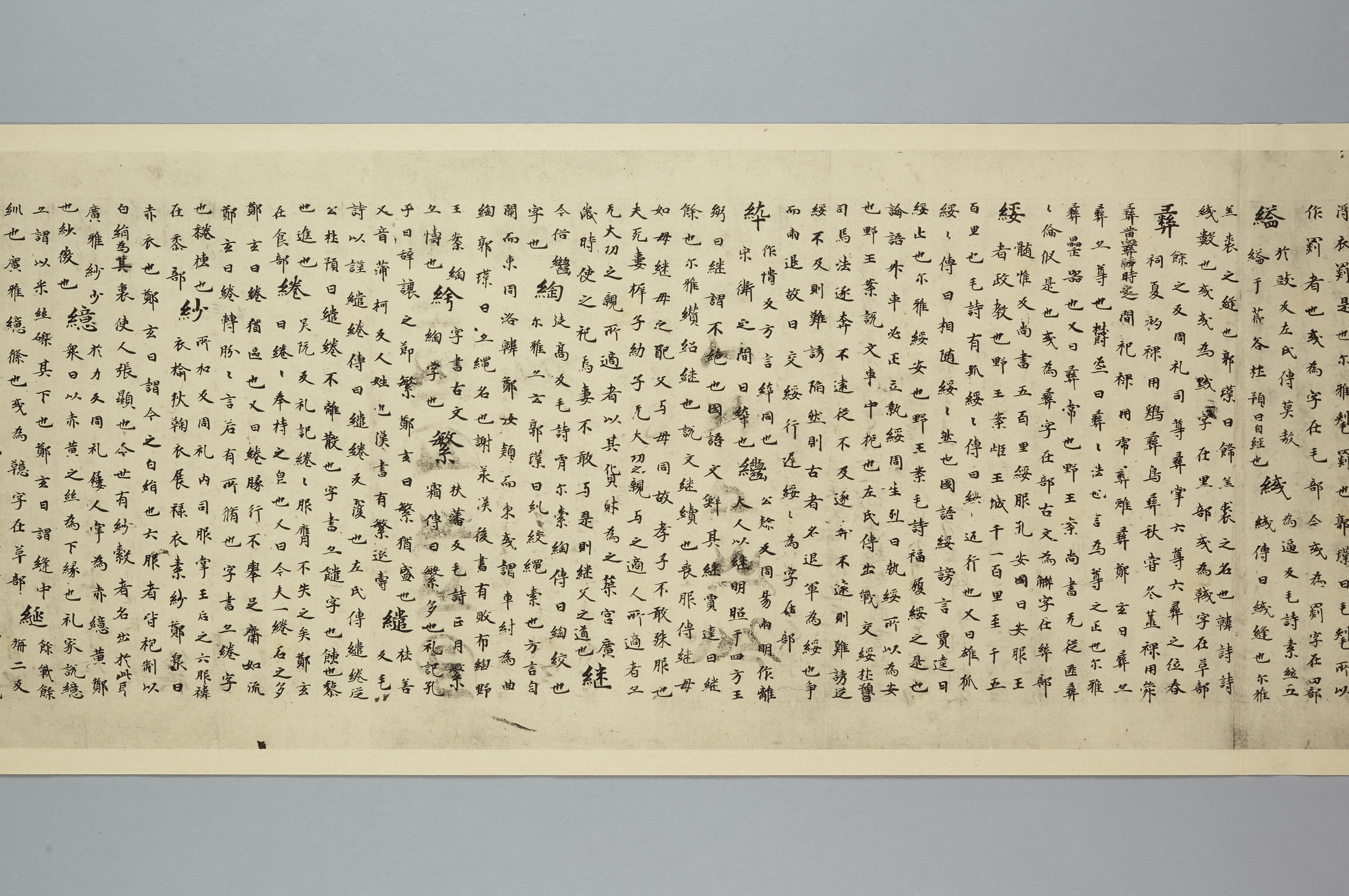
Vol. 27 of the Yupian in Ishiyama-dera, Ōtsu, Japan (facsimile)

The Yupian (Chinese: 玉篇; pinyin: Yùpiān; Wade–Giles: Yü-p'ien; "Jade Chapters") is a c. 543 Chinese dictionary edited by Gu Yewang (顧野王; Ku Yeh-wang; 519–581) during the Liang dynasty. It arranges 12,158 character entries under 542 radicals, which differ somewhat from the original 540 in the Shuowen Jiezi. Each character entry gives a fanqie pronunciation gloss and a definition, with occasional annotation.

The Yupian is a significant work in the history of Written Chinese. It is the first major extant dictionary in the four centuries since the completion of Shuowen and records thousands of new characters that had been introduced into the language in the interim. It is also important for documenting nonstandard súzì (俗字, "popular written forms of characters"), many of which were adopted in the 20th century as official simplified Chinese characters. For instance, the Yupian records that wàn (traditional 萬, "ten thousand, myriad") had a popular form of (simplified 万), which is much easier to write with three strokes versus thirteen.

Baxter describes the textual history:

The original Yùpiān was a large and unwieldy work of thirty juàn ["volumes; fascicles"], and during Táng and Sòng various abridgements and revisions of it were made, which often altered the original fănqiè spellings; of the original version only fragments remain (some two thousand entries out of a reported original total of 16,917), and the currently-available version of the Yùpiān is not a reliable guide to Early Middle Chinese phonology.

In 760, during the Tang dynasty, Sun Jiang (孫強; Sun Chiang) compiled a Yupian edition, which he noted had a total of 51,129 words, less than a third of the original 158,641. In 1013, Song dynasty scholar Chen Pengnian (陳彭年; Ch'en P'eng-nien) published a revised Daguang yihui Yupian (大廣益會玉篇; "Expanded and enlarged Jade Chapters"). The Japanese monk Kūkai brought an original version Yupian back from China in 806, and modified it into his c. 830 Tenrei Banshō Meigi, which is the oldest extant Japanese dictionary.

Kūkai's dictionary, when combined with other fragments of the unedited Yupian extant in Japan, has been used to reconstruct the original phonology of the Yupian. This reconstruction reveals that the Yupian had a phonology similar to the later Qieyun but did not make certain phonological distinctions found there, reflecting the variety of spoken language in the Southern Dynasties.
