= Fanqie =

Classical Chinese phonetic indicators

Chinese name
- Chinese: 反切
- Literal meaning: turn back/run together
Transcriptions
Standard Mandarin
- Hanyu Pinyin: fǎnqiè
- Wade–Giles: fan^{3}-ch'ieh^{4}
Yue: Cantonese
- Yale Romanization: fáan chit
- Jyutping: faan² cit³
Southern Min
- Hokkien POJ: Hoán-chhiat

Vietnamese name
- Vietnamese: phiên thiết
- Chữ Hán: 反切

Korean name
- Hangul: 반절
- Hanja: 反切
Transcriptions
- Revised Romanization: banjeol

Japanese name
- Kanji: 反切
- Hiragana: はんせつ
Transcriptions
- Romanization: hansetsu

Fanqie is a method used in traditional Chinese lexicography to indicate the pronunciation of a monosyllabic character by using two other characters, one with the same initial consonant as the desired syllable and one in which the rest of the syllable (the final) matches. The method was introduced in the 3rd century AD and is to some extent still used in commentaries on the classics and dictionaries.

== History ==
Early dictionaries such as the Erya (3rd century BC) did not indicate pronunciation. One of the innovations of the Shuowen Jiezi (early 2nd century AD) was to indicate the pronunciation of a character by the dúruò (讀若, 'read as') method, giving another character with the same pronunciation. The introduction of Buddhism to China around the 1st century brought Indian phonetic knowledge, which may have inspired the idea of fanqie. According to the 6th-century scholar Yan Zhitui, fanqie were first used by Sun Yan (孫炎), of the Wei kingdom (220–280 AD), in his Erya Yinyi (爾雅音義, "Sounds and Meanings of Erya"). However, earlier examples have been found in the late-2nd-century works of Fu Qian and Ying Shao.

The oldest extant sources of significant bodies of fanqie are fragments of the original Yupian (544 AD) found in Japan and the Jingdian Shiwen, a commentary on the classics that was written in 583 AD. The method was used throughout the Qieyun, a Chinese rhyme dictionary published in 601 AD during the Sui dynasty. When Classical Chinese poetry flowered during the Tang dynasty, the Qieyun became the authoritative source for literary pronunciations. Several revisions and enlargements were produced, the most important of which was the Guangyun (1007–1008). Even after the more sophisticated rime table analysis was developed, fanqie continued to be used in dictionaries, including the voluminous Kangxi Dictionary published in 1716, and the Ciyuan and Cihai of the 1930s.

The Liǎng tǐ Qīngwén Jiàn (兩體清文鑒, "Mirror of the two Qing languages") was a bilingual Sino-Manchu dictionary published in the mid-18th century. A unique feature of this work was that the pronunciation of Chinese words was given using the Manchu script, while that of Manchu words was given using fanqie.

== Function ==
The first entry in the Qieyun, with added highlighting of the fanqie formula

In the fanqie method, a character's pronunciation is represented by two other characters. The onset (initial consonant) is represented by that of the first of the two characters (上字 'upper word', as Chinese was written vertically); the final (including the medial glide, the nuclear vowel and the coda) and the tone are represented by those of the second of the two characters (下字, 'lower word'). For example, in the Qieyun, the character 東 is described by the formula 德紅反. The first two characters indicate the onset and the final, respectively, and so the pronunciation of 東 [tuŋ] is given as the onset [t] of 德 [tək] with the final [uŋ] of 紅 [ɣuŋ], with the same tone as 紅.

In the rhyme dictionaries, there was a tendency to choose pairs of characters that agree on the presence or absence of a palatal medial -j-, but there was no such tendency for the rounded medial -w-, which was represented solely in the final character. There was also a strong tendency to spell words with labial initials using final characters with labial initials.

The third character 反 fǎn 'turn back' is the usual marker of a fanqie spelling in the Qieyun. In later dictionaries such as the Guangyun, the marker character is 切 qiè 'run together'. (The commonly-cited reading 'cut' seems to be modern.) The Qing scholar Gu Yanwu suggested that fǎn, which also meant 'overthrow', was avoided after the devastating rebellions during the middle of the Tang dynasty. The origin of both terms is obscure. The compound word fǎnqiè first appeared during the Song dynasty.

== Analysis ==
Fanqie provide information about the sounds of earlier forms of Chinese, but its recovery is not straightforward. Several characters could be used for each initial or final, and no character was ever used to spell itself.

However, it is possible to identify the initials and the finals underlying a large and consistent collection of fanqie by using a method that was first used by the Cantonese scholar Chen Li, in his 1842 study of the Guangyun. For example, in that dictionary,

- 東 was spelled 德 + 紅,
- 德 was spelled 多 + 特, and
- 多 was spelled 德 + 河.

That implies that 東, 德 and 多 must all have had the same initial. By following such chains of equivalence, Chen identified categories of equivalent initial spellers, and a similar process was possible for the finals. Unaware of Chen's work, the Swedish linguist Bernard Karlgren repeated the analysis to identify the initials and finals in the 1910s.

Chen's method can be used to identify the categories of initials and finals, but not their sound values, for which other evidence is required. Thus, Middle Chinese has been reconstructed by Karlgren and later scholars by comparing those categories with Sino-Xenic pronunciations and the pronunciations in modern varieties of Chinese.

== Effects of sound change ==
The method described the pronunciations of characters in Middle Chinese, but the relationships have been obscured as the language evolved into the modern varieties over the last millennium and a half. Middle Chinese had four tones, and initial plosives and affricates could be voiced, aspirated, or voiceless unaspirated. Syllables with voiced initials tended to be pronounced with a lower pitch, and by the late Tang dynasty, each of the tones had split into two registers (traditionally known as yīn 陰 and yáng 陽) conditioned by the initials. Voicing then disappeared in all dialects except the Wu and Xiang groups, with voiced initials becoming aspirated or unaspirated depending on the tone. The tones then underwent further mergers in various varieties of Chinese. Thus, the changes in both the initial and the tone, which were represented by different characters in the fanqie pair, were conditioned on each other.

For example, the characters of formula 東 [tuŋ] = 德 [tək] + 紅 [ɣuŋ] are pronounced dōng, dé and hóng in modern Standard Chinese, where the pinyin letter d represents the voiceless and unaspirated stop [t]. The tones no longer match, because the voiceless initial [t] and the voiced initial [ɣ] condition different registers of the Middle Chinese level tone, yielding the first and the second tones of the modern language.

That effect sometimes led to a form of spelling pronunciation. Yuen Ren Chao cited the example of the character 强, which had two readings in Middle Chinese. It could be read as [ɡjɑnɡ] in the level tone, meaning 'strong, powerful', which developed regularly into the modern reading qiáng. However, it could be read also as [ɡjɑnɡ] in the rising tone, meaning 'stubborn' or 'forced'. The regular development would be for the voiced initial [ɡ] to condition the yang register of the rising tone, becoming the fourth tone of modern Chinese and for the rising tone to condition an unaspirated initial. Thus, jiàng would be expected, and this does occur in the sense 'stubborn', but the character also has the unexpected pronunciation qiǎng for the sense 'forced'. Chao attributed this to the fanqie formula 强 = 其 [ɡi] (level tone) + 兩 [ljɑnɡ] (rising tone) given in dictionaries. Here, the first character is now pronounced qí because in the level tone, the voiced initial becomes aspirated. However, the second character is now pronounced liǎng because in the rising tone, sonorants like [l] conditioned the yin register, which led to the modern third tone.

== Use in Cantonese ==
In Cantonese, fanqie can be found in some dictionaries to this day, often alongside other Cantonese romanization systems or phonetic guides, to indicate the pronunciation of characters lacking a homophone.

For example, in the Sun Ya dictionary the character 攀 is transcribed as pinyin pān and for Cantonese pan¹ and the Cantonese tonal homophone 扳, whereas 戀, lacking a tonal homophone, is transcribed as lyn² and (拉婉切) (l-āai + yún) to give lyún. If there is no tonal homophone, the tone is indicated. For example 實用廣州話分類詞典 transcribes 仆 as [pʰok⁶] and fanqie (披屋切) (p-ēi + ūk) but 𠵿, lacking a tonal homophone is transcribed as [pʰɛ¹] and 〔音披爺切第1聲〕, i.e. p-ēi + y-èh with tone 1 to give pē.

== See also ==
- Transliteration of Chinese
