= Iboshi Hokuto =

Ainu poet and activist (1901–1929)

- 違星 北斗
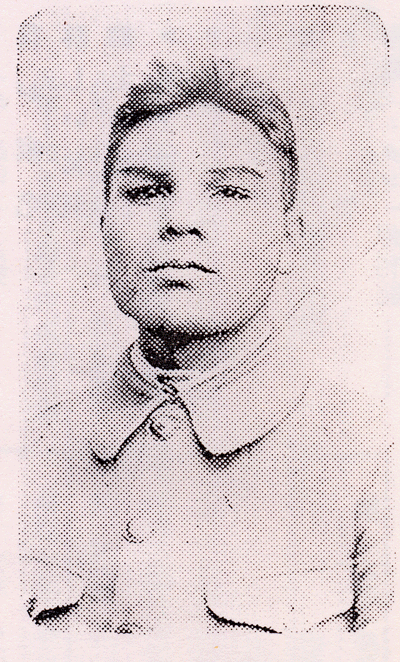
- Born: Takijirō Iboshi; 1901; Yoichi, Hokkaido, Japan
- Died: January 26, 1929 (aged 27–28)
- Occupations: Poet, social activist

Iboshi Hokuto (違星 北斗; 1901 – January 26, 1929) was a Japanese Ainu waka poet and social activist.

He devoted his life to improving the standing of the Ainu people, expressing his ideas as tanka in newspapers and magazines and influencing the Ainu youth of the time. He also circulated around the Ainu kotan (villages) of Hokkaido, preaching of the need for unity and the formation of an Ainu identity.

Along with Yaeko Batchelor and Takeichi Moritake, Iboshi is counted as one of the "Three Great Ainu Poets" (アイヌ三大歌人). He has been called the "Takuboku of the Ainu".

== Life ==
=== Childhood ===
Hokuto was born in 1901 in the first district of Ōgawa-chō in the town of Yoichi, the third son of his father Jinsaku and mother Haru. Jinsaku made his living fishing for herring, but was also an accomplished bear hunter.

The Iboshi family name dated back to the time of Hokuto's grandfather Manjirō. Manjirō went in 1872 to study in Tokyo on the grounds of Zōjō-ji, at the "Aborigine Education Facility" associated with the Kaitakushi (Hokkaido Development Commission). With excellent grades, he remained in Tokyo as an official of the Kaitakushi. Manjirō was one of the first Ainu permitted to adopt a Japanese name. His family possessed a hereditary symbol called an ikashishiroshi (イカシシロシ) — something like a Japanese kamon crest — consisting of two lines crossed in an "X" and two round dots to the top and bottom, situated between the lines (like ※ without the left and right dots). From the special terminology of kamon, which refers to the cross shape as chigai (違い) and the dots as hoshi (星), he derived the name "Chigaiboshi" (違星). In the course of usage, though, the name took on the shorter reading of "Iboshi".

Hokuto's official name in the family register was thus Takijirō Iboshi (違星 瀧次郎) – but the first name was a misprint by the scribe, who had been told the boy's name was Takejirō Iboshi (竹次郎). His friends called him Takejirō or just Take, and he himself wrote his name either way, or even as "竹二郎".

When Hokuto was young he was a ringleader for the local children. In 1908, though, his education-minded mother Haru sent him to the 6-year Jinjō Elementary School (尋常小学校), rather than the 4-year "Former Aborigine School" most of the local Ainu children attended. With only a few Ainu peers at the school, he endured severe discrimination. When he was in his fifth year, his mother died, and he abandoned aspirations for educational advancement, instead beginning to work upon his graduation in 1914. In addition to helping with his father's fishing work, he did manual labor away from home in forestry and agriculture, but continued to meet with societal discrimination as an Ainu.

=== Teenage years ===
Perhaps from the severe pressure of demanding manual labor and discriminatory treatment, the already frail Iboshi fell seriously ill at 17, and from this point on came to take an interest in more ideological pursuits. Around the same time, he saw two tanka in the Hokkai Times that showed disdain for the Ainu, further increasing his bitterness towards the Japanese. Around this time, though, he was deeply moved by some small words a Japanese school principal he sat beside spoke to him at a meeting. As minor a thing as it was, this event completely changed his opinion of the Japanese he'd seen as cold-blooded.

Influenced by his old schoolteacher Naoya Nara, Iboshi became interested in ideas of culture and character. He became involved in youth groups and made an effort to get along with the Japanese, coming to believe that the Ainu needed to develop their own cultural awareness, as well as a consciousness of their status as Japanese nationals, and develop both people and a society of splendid character that would contribute to society alongside the Japanese. During this time he was also conscripted, in 1923, as a logistics officer in the 7th division of the Imperial Japanese Army, but after a little more than a month he was discharged, perhaps for illness.

From this time on, Iboshi formed the culture group Chawashō Gakkai (茶話 学会) with other Ainu youth from Yoichi, including his childhood friend Totten Nakazato (中里凸天), under the guidance of his teacher Nara. Holding study sessions and publishing a bulletin called Chawashi (茶話誌), they held various activities to raise awareness. By Nara's introduction, Iboshi became a devoted reader of Mitsujirō Nishikawa's culture magazine Jidō Dōwa (自働道話) and met Nishikawa in person when the latter visited Hokkaido.

It was also around this time that Iboshi began producing haiku under the tutelage of Nara and the newly appointed teacher Kenji Yoshida. He participated in gatherings of haiku poets in Yoichi and began submitting his work to the Tokyo poetry magazine Nihihari.

=== Life in Tokyo ===
In February 1925, through the kind offices of Mitsujirō Nishikawa, Iboshi obtained a job as a clerk with the Tokyo Market Association (東京府市場協会) and was thrilled to move to the capital. The Market Association managed a public market, and its offices were then located in Yotsuya ward (now in Shinjuku, in the vicinity of Golden Gai). When he arrived in Asagaya, where Nishikawa lived, off of a steam train ride taking a full two days, Nishikawa's wife was shocked to hear that Iboshi had drunk only one cup of milk during the entire trip.

Iboshi visited the linguist Kyōsuke Kindaichi shortly after his arrival, and was impacted by the story of Yukie Chiri, an Ainu girl who wrote A Collection of the Ainu Epics of the Gods (アイヌ神謡集, Ainu Shinyōshū) before dying at the age of 19. The picture she book painted of Hokkaido as a lost paradise of the Ainu impressed Iboshi, and that vision had a great influence on his later work. Speaking with Kindaichi also gave him his first knowledge his fellow Ainu and future compatriots, the adopted daughter of the Anglican missionary John Batchelor Yaeko Batchelor and Yukie Chiri's younger brother Mashiho Chiri.

Kindaichi invited Iboshi to the Tokyo Ainu Conference (東京アイヌ学会), where he gave lectures to scholars of some standing, including the folklorist Tarō Takayama and the "father of Okinawaology" Iha Fuyū. His association with Kindaichi's connections also let him meet authors and publishers. Meanwhile, he became deeply involved with Nishikawa's Jidō Dōwa magazine, and deepened his inquiry into culture and religion by visiting then-influential groups like Seikō Gotō's Kibōsha and Tanaka Chigaku's Nichiren Buddhist group Kokuchūkai.

Life in Tokyo gave Iboshi a job and chances to meet various celebrities and personages, as well as knowledge and experience from participating in various academic and lecture groups. Furthermore, he was free of the discrimination that had plagued him in Hokkaido and could live out productive days in peace.

Even so, these happy days did not last. Realizing that he was now being pampered because of his status as an Ainu, which had brought him prejudice back home, troubled Iboshi. Finally, he decided that he could not be spoiled by people's kindness, and that the Ainu needed to revive themselves with their own hands. He left behind a prosperous year and a half in Tokyo to return to his birthplace of Hokkaido, resolved to save his fellows from poverty and discrimination.

=== In Horobetsu and Biratori ===
On July 5, 1926, Hokuto boarded a night train out of Ueno Station and left Tokyo, sent off by many people. On July 7 he arrived in Horobetsu, now the town of Noboribetsu. He first headed to Horobetsu's Anglican church to meet Yaeko Batchelor. Remaining a few days in Horobetsu, he visited the home of Yukie Chiri and met Mashiho Chiri.

After visiting the surrounding kotan, including Shiraoi, he went on the 14th to Biratori with the intention of learning more about Ainu culture. Supported by Seikō Gotō of Kibōsha, he helped out in a kindergarten managed by John Batchelor. However, conflict broke out between these two sponsors during Hokuto's stay, including Gotō's cutting funding to the kindergarten, and Iboshi was caught between them.

Working day jobs, including construction work, Iboshi traveled the kotan of Hidaka Subprefecture, distributing copies of Jidō Dōwa, meeting his fellow Ainu, and continuing his awareness campaign. He also submitted Ainu folklore to Kodomo no Dōwa (子供の道話), a magazine run by Nishikawa's wife. Since returning to Hokkaido, he began vigorously producing tanka instead of haiku poetry.

=== Back in Yoichi ===
In February 1927, Iboshi's older brother Umetarō's son died of illness, and Iboshi returned to his hometown. There, he helped with the fishing, but on top of a poor catch, he fell ill again and recuperated in Yoichi. In the meantime, he worked with his old friend Nakazato to make a mimeograph fan magazine, named Kotan, which they completed in August. They also conducted investigations of the ruins in the area and interviewed elderly local residents.

On October 3, he was recognized by Bonsei Namiki and one of his tanka was published in the Otaru Shimbun for the first time. After this, he published a continuous stream of tanka, essays, and research in that newspaper. On November 3, he attended a gathering of poets in Yoichi, where he met the poets of Otaru, including Bonsei Namiki and Shōji Inabata. Meeting with praise and admiration, he struck up a friendship with them. He also began contributing heavily to their new poetry periodical, Shin Tanka Jidai (新短歌時代).

From December 1927 to January 1928, Iboshi released a series called The Dubious Ruins of Fugoppe (疑ふべきフゴツペの遺跡). In response to an opinion piece by the local professor Shōzō Nishida regarding the then-recent discovery of stone walls and dolls appearing to bear ancient lettering, which had been entitled These are Ainu Artifacts (アイヌのものである), Iboshi argued that these were not Ainu relics, and were more likely fakes. Takeichi Moritake, who lived in Shiraoi and would later be counted among the three great Ainu poets with Iboshi and Yaeko Batchelor, first encountered Hokuto's work at this point. He was greatly moved, and the two would later strike up a friendship.

=== Peddler ===
From the end of 1927 on, Iboshi began traveling around kotan all over Hokkaido as a peddler selling hemorrhoid medicine. This too was a vehicle for him to meet fellow Ainu and advocate the improvement of Ainu standing by self-awareness, unity, and culture. He circled Otaru, Chitose, Muroran, Shiraoi, and Horobetsu. In Muroran he was welcomed as an ethnological researcher, in Shiraoi he met with Takeichi Moritake, and in Horobetsu he met again with Mashiho Chiri. He did not always travel alone: he was joined for a time by Kazurō Petei (辺泥和郎), and then by Kikutarō Yoshida, who shared his ideals and who he dubbed the Ainu Solidarity Association (アイヌ一貫同志会, Ainu Ikkan Dōshikai).

In the spring of 1928, Iboshi returned home to Yoichi to gather funds working with the family fishing.

He continued to draw attention as a poet, publishing tanka almost every week in the Otaru Shimbun and having a special edition of the Sapporo poetry magazine Shizuku (志づく) dedicated to a collection of his works. This issue represents the only reasonably collected set of his works released during his lifetime.

=== Illness ===
Despite his poetic success, the hard work of fishing was once again putting stress on Iboshi's body. On April 25, 1928, he had a lung hemorrhage and entered a period of fighting the illness at his older brother's house. The disease was tuberculosis. Iboshi did not give up, and on his sickbed arranged an anthology of his poetic works entitled Hokuto-jō (北斗帖). He also continued sending poems about fighting the illness to the Otaru Shimbun.

The sickness continued to eat away at his body and spirit regardless, and on January 26, 1929, at 9 A.M, he died at the age of 27. He left behind three death poems.

=== Legacy ===
Seikō Gotō, who Iboshi had looked up to since his time in Tokyo, grieved at Iboshi's death and planned to release a posthumous collection of his manuscripts. The haiku poet Kenji Yoshida, who had been close to Iboshi, organized the manuscripts that had been in a traveling bag by his pillow and sent them to the Kibōsha. After editing, Kibōsha released the collection in May 1930, a year after Iboshi's death, entitled Kotan: The Posthumous Manuscripts of Hokuto Iboshi (違星北斗遺稿 コタン)

In July 1931, the first unified association of Hokkaido was formed, fittingly called the Ainu Association of Hokkaido. Many of its primary members had been influenced by Iboshi, and the movement on which he had gambled his life finally took form.

Hokuto Iboshi was forgotten for years until 1954, when Toshihiko Hiroko established the Hokuto Iboshi Association (違星北斗の会) with others connected to the deceased poet. Gathering and collecting his works, they pushed for the construction of monuments and creation of a radio drama about him. In 1959 Kisaku Yumoto introduced Iboshi alongside Yaeko Batchelor and Takeichi Moritake in Poets of the Ainu (アイヌの歌人). Kotan was included in the 1972 compilation Records of Recent Peoples 5: The Ainu (近代民衆の記録5アイヌ) from Shin Jinbutsu Ōrai-sha (新人物往来社), and in Rippū Shōbō Publishing's Complete Literature of Hokkaido (北海道文学全集), volume 11. In 1984 Sofukan republished Kotan, making Hokuto's works much easier to obtain.

He was honored by Google Doodles on October 3, 2024. The date was chosen as it was when his first tanka was published in a newspaper in 1927.
