= Hoyau =

Dragon in Ainu mythology

Hoyau or hoyau kamui (var, oyau kamui), in Ainu mythology, is a type of malodorous and venomous dragon or dragon god, believed to thrive in summer or near fire, but lose strength in the cold, whose trait earns it the alternative name of sak-somo-ayep ("that which must not be mentioned in the summer").

They are generally held to be dwellers of lakes and swamps, but are also winged according to some folklore accounts.

== Terminology ==
The Ainu dragon (wanjiku) is generally held to dwell in lakes and swamps and issue foul odor, and are known by such names as the hoyau (meaning "serpent" in Sakhalin dialect), chatai or catay (borrowed from Japanese jatai (蛇体) lit. "serpent body" ), and sak-somo-ayep (lit. "that which must not be mentioned in the summer."). (Note: Composed of sak "summer" + somo-aye "not say" + -p "the one who..", suffix that changes adjectives and verbs into nouns. The term is variously transliterated into Japanese as sakisomaeppu (サキソマエップ) or sakusomoayepu (サクソモアイェプ).) (Note: Philippi (1979) citing Kubodera (1977).)

According to the lore collected by Iwao Yoshida, the hoyau belongs to the tribe of sak-somo-ayep. Epic songs (yukar) from the Saru District region (i.e., western rim of Hidaka Subprefecture) refer to the serpent as hoyau, according to Genzō Sarashina, though he also describes at length the legend of the hoyau kamui of Lake Tōya localized around the Abuta District in the Iburi Subprefecture. (Note: Other than Lake Tōya, there were Karimba-tō ("Cherry Swamp") and Netnusa-tō (Japanese: ネツヌサトウ) which also had the hoyau as the resident lord of these bodies of water.)

== General description ==
The sak-somo-ayep is said to dwell in lakes and swamps of the western parts of the Hidaka Subprefecture region. According to lore around this Hidaka region, the sak-somo-ayep possesses a winged, serpent-like body, with torso like a tawara or a bale of rice (i.e. stout and cylindrical), and a narrow head and tail emerging out of this trunk. It also has a pointed, chisel-like snout which can slice or rip large trees. The whole body is pale black in color, but the rim around the eyes and the periphery of the mouth are scarlet. (Note: Sarashina (1967), in Japanese: "日高から西部の湖には、サクソモアイェプ（夏に言われぬ者）という、翼の生えた蛇体がいるといわれ、胴体は俵の様で頭と尾が細く、鼻先がノミのように尖っていてこれがぶつかると、大木でも伐り倒されたり引裂かれたりする。全身淡黒色で目の縁と口のまわりが赤く、[cont. about the odor:] ひどい悪臭があって、これの棲んでいる近くに行っても、またその通った跡を歩いてもその悪臭のために、皮膚がはれたり全身の毛が脱けおちてしまう。")

According to some lore, the hoyau (oyau) that has gained wings are called rap-us-oyau (ラプウシオヤウ). But according to the native Ainu folklorist Mashiho Chiri, hoyau was the common vulgar name, while rap-us-nupur-kur (ラプシヌプルクル, lit. "winged supernaturally-powered deity") was its divine name for the same divinity.

The aforementioned sak-somo-ayep appellation (meaning "one which cannot be spoken of in summer") derives its name from the belief that the dragon thrives in summer or near a fire sources, but are weakened and unable to command movement of their bodies as desired in the winter or cold, similar in nature to the serpent that hibernates when temperatures drop. As it abhors the cold, it may spiritually possess a miko (shamaness) and command humans to "stoke the fire".

=== Toxicity ===
The sak-somo-ayep not only issues a foul smell, (Note: Philippi: "[Ainu] Dragons are always depicted as living in lakes or swamps and emitting a terrible stench".) but contact with this body odor or musk causes plants to shrivel and die. Humans situated downwind of the dragon may lose their body hair, or develop swells on their skin, and should they come too near they can be afflicted by fatal skin-ravaging burns. At a hamlet named Chin at the mouth of the Mu River on the side towards Hidaka, a swamp referred to as a kamui-tō ("God swamp") was said to be inhabited by the hoyau kamui, and passersby took the precaution of always checking the condition of the swamp from a hilltop before approaching the village, lest they suffer the ill effects of the hoyau kamui.

Swamps on Mount Poroshiri, the tallest peak of the Hidaka Mountains, as well as mountains in the Saru District region are reputedly inhabited by the sak-somo-ayep, and though they cannot be seen, the strong smell issued by the dragons have been held responsible for the swelling or bloating developed on the skin, according to testimony by early 20th century informants. (Note: Yoshida's informant Paresina (Japanese: パレシナ) was recounting what allegedly happened to his elder brother Sankoreasi(?) (Japanese: サンコレアシ).)

According to one epic song (yukar), the dragon-god sak-somo-ayep issued a stench that was noxious and lethal to both humans and gods, so that the deity Okikurmi took on the task of slaying it. The god pretended to be human, and connived the dragon into visiting a village upstream. The villagers were busy arranging for some ceremony, evidently a wedding, with the elder preparing to give away his (aged) daughter in marriage to the dragon. However, when the dragon ate the delectable fish offered, it caused a belly ache that eventually proved his death. The villagers were actually a tribe of hornets or shi-soya (and the elder was the lord of these hornets), that had been assigned the mission of assassinating the dragon by the deity. (Note: Kubodera's anthology, Yukar No. 38.) According to another yukar, Okikurmi with his incantations caused hail to fall, and after the cold weighed down heavily on the dragon's wings, the god cut it down with the sword.

According to Ainu lore collected by the missionary John Batchelor in the 19th century, a (mythical) large serpent was blamed as "the immediate cause of wasps and stinging ants". He also relates the tale about a large female serpent that tried to entice a hero, and cursed him with a 1,000 year-old longevity after being shunned.

=== Spiritual possession ===
It has been stated that the "[Ainu] dragons are sometimes companion spirits of shamanesses", shamanesses being commonly referred to as miko by Japanese sources. In the foregoing example of the dragon god that took spiritual possession of a miko priestess and demanded the stoking of fire to alleviate the cold, the host priestess had initially been inhabited by a spider deity, which yielded its place to the superior dragon god. The purpose for which the priestess was consulted was to divine the cause of illness for the village elder's wife at Abuta (Aputa), therefore, in terms of localization, this is also an example of §Lake Tōya lore discussed in section below.

== Lake Tōya ==
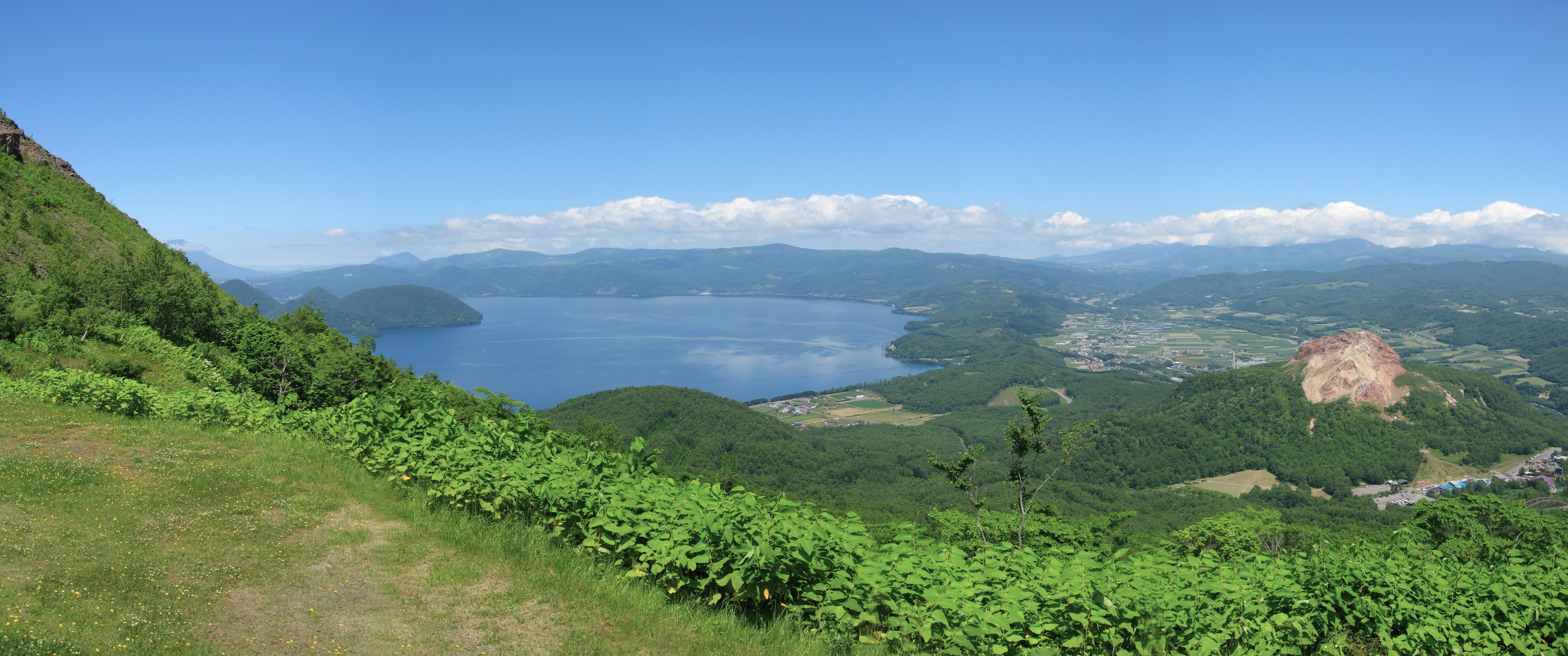
Lake Tōya is one of the places to which legends about hoya are attached.

According to myth, the lord (nushi (主) (Note: The (colloquial) term nushi is commonly applied to supposed "[m]ysterious creatures living in ponds, lakes, rivers or mountains".)) which inhabits Lake Tōya is the serpent-bodied being. The hoyau of Lake Tōya were held to be menacing demonic deity generally, but at times could provide blessing, and be a sort of guardian deity. Specifically, when the Hōsōshin (smallpox deity) descended upon Abuta (now Tōyako town) and caused smallpox to spread, the people fled to the shores of Lake Tōya, and the hoyau with its horrible stench dispelled the Hōsōshin, saving the townsfolk. Some say that the hoyau of the lake is closer to a winged turtle than a dragon, (Note: Yoshida also states it is believed to have a "body of a turtle" (體亀), and adds the fine-print ruby gloss "echinge (エチンゲ)"; i.e., ecinke meaning "turtle" in Ainu.) and when an epidemic strikes, the local folk would offer sake spirits to the hoyau and to the Yke-usekur (??) (transliterated into Japanese as Ikeeuseguru (イケエウセグル)), the mountain spirit of Mt. Usu (有珠山), thus praying for the disease to subside. (Note: Another source explains that strong sake was also offered to the mountain spirit of Usu at times of eruption. Yoshida gives interlinear reading of Mt. Usu as "Uhuynupuri" in Ainu, but uhuy nupuri is a common noun for "volcano".)
