= Ipetam =

Supernatural sword in the legends of the Ainu of Hokkaido

An ipetam or ibetam (Note: Japanese: イペタム/イペタㇺ.) is a supernatural sword in the legends of the Ainu of Hokkaido.

== Nomenclature ==
Also styled epe-tam (Note: With Japanese transcription エベタム where "p" sound is replaced by "b".) as well as ibetam. (Note: Other Japanese transcriptions are エペタム, イベタム, イベタン.Kawakami (1976), pp. 14–15)

The literal meaning breaks down to ipe 'eat' + tam 'sword', henced glossed as "eating sword", "object-eating sword", a "yōtō (eerie sword)" and "man-eater sword", a man-eating reiken (霊剣; "spiritual sword"). But Batchelor (1905) glosses merely as "a sword".

Many sources call it a yōtō, where yō (妖) can signify an ayakashi or yōkai-like phenomenon. Well-known is the legend of the yōtō Muramasa that allegedly was a curse or nemesis to the Tokugawa; one commentary is that the ipetam was "called a man-eater sword and the Ainu feared it just as inlanders (people south of Hokkaido) feared the Muramasa". (Note: "人喰刀と云つて內地の村正の如くアイヌ達は恐れて居た") (Cf. § Saru).

A sword imbued with venomous aura is called a rukane emush (ru 'poison' ru '-ing' emus 'sword') (Note: Japanese: ルーカネエムシ.) (Note: The source adds that the Ainu believed cuts suffered from a defensive weapon such as a sosamushpe (ソウサムシペ, = osamuspe, sosamuspe, a wall-hanging great sword) always proved fatal.)

== Overview ==
Such a sword rattled with a noise that sounded like katakata, and delighted in blood, and once drawn could not be sheathed until it sliced a man and drew blood, according to some, or even flew in the air of its own accord and attack, according to others.

While kept inside a box, it would feed on rocks for food making gorigori (grinding) noises, or kirikiri noises (Note: Presumably the high-pitched sound that a kiri or awl makes when being drilled through a tight hole.) in the lore of Asahikawa. or feed noisily on leather strips. There is a stock tale disseminated all over Hokkaido, in which a villager would loosen the rivet of some sort of blade tool to make it rattle, tricking the bandits into thinking they were facing an ibetam sword and scaring them away.

Another tale type recounts that two ipetam swords were kept fed on rocks, but were cast away into a bottomless swamp pit; nevertheless, a huge rock formation lager emerged that had protrusions like a pair of upright swords (Cf. § Asahikawa and Kamikawa).

In one story, two enchanted swords are also identified as the male sword pinne mosomi (pinne posomi) and the female sword matne mosomi (~posomi), which describe the type or build (short-grooved and long-grooved swords, respectively) (Note: Japanese: ピンネモソミ（～ポソミ）、マッネモソミ（マツネポソミ）. In Japanese sword lingo, the hi groove (fuller) is something carved on the upper half of the blade above the edge and shinogi, and the groove is also called chinagashi (血流し; lit. "blood flow"). An Ainu sword with a fuller is called opinai poso (オピナイポソ), while the fuller with chinagashi (here meaning red-pigmented groove) is a hureipesep (フレイペセップ, where hure means "red"). If the reddened groove is short like the so-called koshibi (腰樋) is deemed male and called pinne posomi, while if the reddened groove is full length like the so-called [kaki]tōshibi ([搔き]通し樋) it is deemed female and called matne posomi.) but both being identified as man-eating epetam and used to destroy the monstrous huri bird (cf.§ Abashiri and Bihoro).

In Katsurakoi, Kushiro is a tradition about an ipetam sword earned the new nickname o po kor pe meaning "cut a pregnant woman", (Note: po kor pe is literally "possessed of a child" and signifies a pregnant woman.) which is what it did (cf. § Katsurakoi in Kushiro). (Note: Japanese: オポコロペ) (Note: Japanese: オボコロベ)

The hero Ponyaumpe is portrayed as owning a dagger of this type. (cf. § Secret man-eating sword).

== Similar weapons ==
There is also the ipeop which is a man-eating spear (Note: Japanese: イペオプ/イペオㇷ゚) or a man-eating lance. (Note: Japanese: 矛イベオプ)

== Local legends ==
=== Asahikawa and Kamikawa ===
According to a legend localized in Asahikawa, a certain old man owned two epetam (man-eating swords). They would stir and make sound if not fed something, so they were kept in a box and given rocks, which they ate making a kirikiri noises. Fearing he himself may be devoured one day, he cast the swords into a bottomless swamp (asam-sak-to (Note: Japanese: アサムサクト、)), but a rock formation resembling a pair of swords now stood from the bottom of the water on the edge of the swamp.

In a variant, a traveler instructs that the ipetam swords should be given rocks (for food), so the owner placed them in an iron box with rocks, and there were heard sounds of rocks being chiseled down, but they did not make movement for some time. But the swords escaped and began attacking people, so were cast away in a bottomless swamp, and the attacks stopped. Beside the swamp the epetam shuma rocks are there still standing.

The megalithic structures in these folklore are said to be the standing rock in the Suijin Ryūō Jinja (水神龍王神社; "Water deity dragon-king shrine") in the present-day Chūwa, Kamuichō (神居町忠和), Asahikawa.

A detail version told in Kamikawa-cho (town), Kamikawa Subprefecture is recorded under the title "Story of the ipetam and the Water God". It tells that in time past, the chieftain of the Kamikawa Ainu owned such a sword (not called ipetam in the text itself) wrapped in a kina-wrapper (i.e., made of cattail stalks) and hung by the spiritual window. (Note: Here styled ルルンブヤラ but perhaps better ロルンプヤラ (ror-un-puyar) as in the Kamui-cho town variant below. The layout of the typical Ainu house (chise) includes the installment of such a window to properly pass objects supposedly to spiritual beings.) It was forbidden to unwrap and view the sword, and kept so for generations. But eventually, a blinding light started leaking out of the package, and when the light rushed out and entered some family home in the village, all the residents there would be found cut to death. To deal with the terror, the current chieftain discarded the wrapping in the mountain or in the river, even the deepest part of the Ishikari River but the cattail wrapping always returned. Then a divine message came down to the chief to seek out the hotuye-pa-usi (the "calling hill") (Note: Japanese: ホトイパウシ.) and find a soaring megalith by the swamp below, build and altar there and pray. He did so an prayed as instructed, when a stoat appeared and dropped a walnut (Note: The text gives エコンノンノ for its Ainu name, parenthesized with the Japanese name ezo itachi (エゾイタチ), literally Ezo weasel. The walnut is supposedly the Japanese species oni gurumi or Juglans ailantifolia.) into the bottomless swamp, which caused the calm surface to stir with waves though no wind was blowing. When the chief cast the wicked sword in this pond with words of prayer, all the killings ceased. What seemed to be waves on the pond were myriads of small serpents wiggling. The villagers whispered that the serpents must have been the servants of the Water God, and the stoat a servant of the Mountain God.

A variant of nearly identical content (with slight phraseology and spelling differences, and precise geography) was recorded as the lore of the present-day Kamui-cho, Asahikawa, entitled "Kamui village's man-eating rock (Epetam Shuma). The sword wrapped in a mushiro (grass mat) woven from cattail, does its wicked killings, and to calm it, the "calling hill" was found by the mouth of the Chūbetsu River, altar built, the sword cast in th bottomless swamp. (Note: Styled アサムトオ.) The location of the altar was commemorated as Epetam Shuma ("Man-eating Rock", which was known to the Japanese as Tateiwa (立岩) or "Standing Rock"), and in the days of the informant, it stood roughly midway between the now defunct Inō Station and the Chikabumi Station. i.e., around the Chūwa, Kamuichō area. (Note: Visual check of the map shows the aforementioned shrine occurs slightly north (closer towards Ishikari River) than the eyeballed midpoint.) (Note: Additional geographical description though superfluous is that the location was in the borders between what was then Daibagahara, Kamui village (present-day Kamuichō Daiba, Asahikawa) and Chūbetsubuto (present-day Asahikawa), and "facing Ishikari River". Another source states that one edge of Daibagahara had an elevated stratum forming a sheer cliff, and this was known as the "Epetam Shuma" (or Tateiwa "Standing Rock").)

=== Saru ===
A story is told that once a stalwart, violent band of Tokachi Ainu went around pillaging the villages of the Saru Ainu. One village was attacked when most of its inhabitants had gone hunting, leaving only one old woman holding the fort. When she realized that a raid was upon her, she waved a nata (machete) with a loose rivet, and made it rattle. The Tokachi Ainu heard the sound and scurried away. The Saru were known to own the deadly Epe-tam sword that was normally kept in a box and made cluttering sounds when it fed on the leather straps (tonto), but when unfed popped out and went on a killing spree.

It is also told that the Ishikari Ainu bandits similarly tried to raid the Saru village and was driven away in like fashion. The storytelling also connects the epetam with Muramasa (the Tokugawa-bane sword).

=== Hobetsu in Mukawa ===
Hobetsu now part of Mukawa gives a tale once upon a time, where a girl was plowing the field, when the Hidaka Ainu came up the river in a raid.She immediately lifted the skirt of her clothing and crouched forward, sticking her butt-out in an evil-warding gesture called the hoparta, and fled. This caused the Hidaka bandits to be blinded and become unable to see her. They eventually found her climbing the fort, which they besieged. The men who normally went on duty at the fort were out hunting, so the old woman left to fend it swung her sickle-machete with the loose rivet, making it clatter. The Hidaka bandits mistook this to be the sound of the man-eating ipetam sword and fled, loosening their loincloths and doing the hoparta.

=== Samani ===
A chief of a village in Samani maintained a fort at Enrum peninsula He owned an ipetam sword, which had a will of its own, which would swing its blade and kill humans of its own accord, a frightening weapon. An enemy attacked the fort trying to steal this weapon, but they became locked in a stalemate. One morning, the chief climbed the lookout tower and found a beached whale on the opposite shore, flocked by many seagulls. The chief gleefully took his underlings to salvage the carcass, but it turned out to be a decoy, a sand-mound strewn with fish to attract the birds. The ruse left the fort unprotected, and the ipetam was stolen away.。

=== Abashiri and Bihoro ===
The story is told that once long ago, the monstrous bird huri (Note: Here given as hūri/fūri (フーリ).) came to reside up north at the mouth of the Abashiri River, inside a cave on the beach (peshui/pishui). The locale was marked by a rock formation called Twin Rock (Japanese: Futatsu-iwa). The cave was forked inside, and the left path eventually led to an exit on a cliff at the opposite bank of the river, at Ōmagari, Abashiri, the right path was said to lead to the underworld. (Note: Given as ポッナシ i.e. potna si, poxna si [?], "lower land" [?], though the usual term is pokna mosir "lower world".) The bird made nest at the beach and started to feed on villagers. The Abashiri Moroyo village owned the male sword pinne mosomi [sic], and Bihoro village owned the female sword matne mosomi both reputed to slay a 1000 men at a single stroke. The Abashiri Moyoro dispatched 6 brave men to hunt it, and on their way the bird had dragged a woman holding a child into the cave. They split up, and 3 men charged first with the sword, never to return, and Moroyo's famous sword was lost, but the bird was never seen again either. The other 3 men who had lagged in the attack returned out of the cave in the riverside cliff. Then another furi was seen perched on the Twin Rock. This time, Bihoro's female sword was borrowed to kill it. They tried to reach the rock by building a bridge with reed-stalk, but the stalks broke and they could not cross. So they threw the sword at it, and the weapon devoured the bird. For this sword too was an ipetam, the "devouring sword". The sword remained stuck on the rock, so no one went to retrieve it, and then it transformed into a snake that was dangling, but later disappeared. Thus Bihoro too lost its precious sword. The cave was later called the furi shui "furi hole". (Note: Recorded October 1950 at Bihoro kotan, from the old man Ginosuke Kikuchi (菊地儀之助翁).)

In a variant, the two swords aren't individually specified. The team of 3 taking the "treasure sword called epetam" presumably succeeds in slaying the giant bird hiwri (Bihoro dialect form of huri), and the other 3 emerge unscathed from the rock-hole by the Abashiri River. (Note: In this version, the six men was headed by the husband whose wife and child was abducted, but it is not clear which was his fate.) Thereafter, people were told never to enter the pishui (beach) hole because it leads to hell.

=== Katsurakoi in Kushiro ===
A story is told localized in Katsurakoi, Kushiro that chieftain's sword which was an ipetam became a pregnant woman-killer, a woman that a jealous village commanded to sneak in to try to steal the chief's other family treasure, a gleaming armor which he propped up on a pole above the chasi fortification for all to see. The ipetam was kept in a double chest, and when dried fish were fed to it would eventually be gone, and the sword would rock and make noise to demand more, so it was always supplied with its food. The chief of Kitami sent in the pregnant woman expecting the village to lower their guard, and it happened on the day the village men were out fishing, so the woman succeeded in the theft. But the Katsurakoi chief realized and gave chase with the magic sword, catching up at the Moshiriya Chashi fortification. He cut the woman down, the unborn child and all, to retrieve his armor, so thenceforth the sword earned the name o po kor pe or "pregnant woman chopper".

In a variant version, an ekasi (elder) of Katsurakoi owned an heirloom ipetam sword kept in a chest that crunched animal bone, making clattering noises and leaving pulverized bone dust. The elder and others became afraid something bad may come of it, so they weighed it down with tied rocks and sank it in the sea, c. 1897. Or others say it was fed on dried fish, but when it was left hungry, the sword would leave from its sheath seeking blood, so that the ipetam was sunk in the sea during the Meiji era.

== Yukar ==
Stories are also sung in yukar format tells of mystic swords.

=== Fish-transformed swords ===
Brothers who were mistreated in their home village departed, and discovered a pair of trout (Japanese: amemasu, whitespotted char) that transformed into two swords, which they kept. The brothers each found a wife in another village and made a new life. The younger brother used to store pieces of leather inside a karabitsu (Chinese style chest, with legs), and occasionally heard noises from it as if rodents were gnawing on objects. One night when his wife awoke to pay her nature's call at the outhouse, she returned to find the house brightened, and a beautiful, gleaming-skinned naked woman had taken her baby girl atop the crossbeam and was violently shaking it. When she opened the door to get in, it turned dark, and the baby was dead with its throat slit. After this tragedy, the woman then bore a son, and one night when her urges awoke her, she was careful to carry the baby boy with her to the outhouse. But when she returned, the tragedy was repeated, only this time her husband was seen throttled, then found dead with the throat cut. The wife's father interrogated the elder brother, and it was learned the curse of the fish-transformed swords must have been responsible. The widow and elder brother discarded the two swords in the mountains but they returned. So they tied them down with rocks and sunk them in the sea.

=== Secret man-eating sword ===
At the hero Ponyaumpe's home was a mukke ipetam, a secret man-eating knife. One night the hero went out carrying the dagger, and reached a large house. Inside were gathered armed men discussing an assault against him. Soon enough, the dagger that was snuck in Ponyaumpe's bosom flew right out and stabbed a shaman to death before returning. The hero barged in and killed the men with his sword. The dagger in his pocket flew out again and cut down all the enemies around to death, down to the last one. Ponyaumpe then brought back with him the two women who were on his side, and the three lived thereafter wanting of nothing.

== See also ==
- Kutune Shirka – Sacred epic of the Ainu
- Ainu sword
