= Sanseido Kokugo Jiten =

Japanese dictionary

The Sanseidō kokugo jiten (三省堂国語辞典; Sanseido's Japanese Dictionary), or the Sankoku (三国) for short, is a general-purpose Japanese dictionary. It is closely affiliated with another contemporary dictionary published by Sanseidō, the Shin Meikai kokugo jiten.

== Overview ==
Japanese linguist and lexicographer Kenbō Hidetoshi (見坊豪紀, 1914-1992) was chief editor of the first four editions. Among his prominent coeditors, Kindaichi Kyōsuke (金田一京助, 1882-1971), his son Kindaichi Haruhiko (金田一春彦, 1913-2004), and Yamada Tadao (山田忠雄, 1916-1996) began with the 1st edition; Shibata Takeshi (柴田武) with the 2nd; Hida Yoshifumi (飛田良文) with the 4th; and Ichikawa Takashi (市川孝) began editing with the 5th edition Sanseidō kokugo jiten. Several of these lexicographers worked together on a predecessor Sanseido dictionary, the Meikai kokugo jiten (明解国語辞典). Kenbō began working with its chief editor Kindaichi Kyōsuke on the 1st edition (1943) and was an editor on the 2nd edition (1952).

In 1959, Sanseido placed Kenbō in charge of the Sanseidō kokugo jiten, and subsequently put Yamada in charge of the comparatively larger Shin Meikai kokugo jiten (1972 … 2005). The 1st edition Sanseidō kokugo jiten (1960) had 57,000 headwords, while the 2nd-5th editions increased the numbers to 62,000 (1974), 65,000 (1982), 73,000 (1992), and 76,000 (2001) respectively.

Emphasizing contemporary usage is one of Sanseidō kokugo jiten's most significant contributions to modern Japanese lexicography. Many traditional Japanese dictionaries copy usage examples from earlier dictionaries, often taken from Classical Japanese language sources. When Kenbō Hidetoshi began compiling the 1st edition, he started collecting Japanese word usages from newspapers, magazines, and broadcasts, which he would write on cards. By the time he died, he had recorded some 1,400,000 usage example cards.

The Sanseidō kokugo jiten is known for including neologisms, katakana loanwords, and informal expressions. Tom Gally, a Japanese translator and lexicographer, gives this evaluation:

Like the other Sanseidou dictionaries, this one has a strong contemporary emphasis and shows the influence of its late editor's renowned citation collecting. The entries include many colloquialisms that were missed or ignored by other lexicographers.

== Editions ==
The Sanseidō kokugo jiten has been revised about once a decade.

- 1960, 1st edition
- 1974, 2nd edition
- 1982, 3rd edition
- 1992, 4th edition
- 2001, 5th edition
- 2007, 6th edition
- 2014, 7th edition
- 2022, 8th edition
