= Huri (Ainu legendary bird) =

Mythical bird in Japanese folkore

A huri or furi is a giant bird in Ainu folklore. Its name suggests a red or reddish bird, and by some lore said to have a single wing measuring 28 kilometres (17 mi).

According to an etiological tale, its ancestors had been banished to hiding in caves by the gods who sided with humans, and were vengeful, bringing wind-storm disaster to humans(§ Kunnui River). Another tale holds that the ancestors of eastern Hokkaido in their chilhood were attacked and held down by the huri, but saved by the ancestress of western Hokkaido (§ Sumunkur Ainu). Some regions remember the huri as harmless to humans when it lived near them, though it hunted large game and even whales, but was offended by a girl's transgression in its drinking spot and moved away (§ Tokachi). Other regions characterize the huri as man-killers, requiring eradication. The eradication was done with the use of two special ipetam swords in the lore of § Abashiri (and Bihoro). Elsewhere, a man with a giant male member killed the bird with a giant spear, saving the village (§ Hobetsu).

In some tales, a decoy is used to lure and slay the bird, such as a decoy made of deerskin (§ Saru, Hidaka), or a sort of scarecrow using crafted deadwood as framework and dressing it up in human clothing (§ Uryū). Some are onomastic (toponymic) tales for Uryū, or for Chikabumi (§ Asahikawa), or § Ishikari. Some hypothesize the giant bird myth derives from an eagle or a vulture.

== Nomenclature ==
The name is represented variously in Japanese transliteration (Note: e.g., フレウ, フウリ, フリカムイ, フリーカムイ or フリー.), and there are local dialect forms. In the lore of Chikabumi, Asahikawa the name is given as hurin or hurin tono. (Note: i.e., フーリン, フーリントノ.) In Bihoro, the hiwri or siwri pronunciation has been recorded. (Note: i.e., ヒウリ, シウリ.) Around Kushiro, the variant form huryū (フリュー) is given.

Batchelor's dictionary (1905) glosses furi as a type of large bird, an eagle according to some. (Cf. § Vulture hypothesis), and since in the Ainu language hure denotes 'red' color, the name must reflect some connection with redness, possibly the plumage being of red-brownish color.

According to lore, when the hero Ponyaunpe subjugated the northern regions, he encountered the hure cicap ("Red Bird") in the hure kenas (Red Forest), and another monstrous kunne cicap ("Black Bird") at the kunne pe (Black River).

== Folklore ==
Representative huri kamuy (huri god) folklores are localized in the region of the Kunnui River (国縫川) (whose name derives from Ainu for "Black River") and the hamlet of Kunnui, at Oshimanbe in Oshima Subprefecture, Hokkaido (§ Kunnui River), and also around Shibechari River (Shizunai River), Hidaka Subprefecture.

The gigantic bird's one wing along measured 7 ri or 28 kilometres (17 mi) in today's units, (Note: More precisely 27.5 km) according to some tellings. (Note: Writer Yoshie Wada, whose birthplace was Oshamambe where Kunnui River pases through, remarked in the essay anthology Junban ga kurumade (順番が来るまで) lit. "When one's turn arrives" that the "Furi kamuy woud come flying, its wings blocking the sun, causing the river to grow dark, or such lore exists among the Ainu", Kurai nagare (暗い流れ) lit. "Dark current" whereas in his novel it is stated that just one of its wings' span measured 7 ri (28 kilometres (17 mi)) ".) In a lore that held it to be the nushi or lord of the Tokachi River, the bird posed no real harm to humans, but after a certain girl stomped across its drinking spot, it was enraged by the desecration and left the area (cf. § Tokachi) However, in other instances, it is feared as a man-killer (cf. e.g. § Hobetsu, § Abashiri).

=== Kunnui River ===
According to folklore about the remote past, told under the title "Revenge of the huri kamui", a huri bird chose to live at an Ainu community formed in Yamakoshi, next to Kunnui River (国縫川), and became a threat to their lives and livelihood. At the source of the river was a takkop/tapkop or bumpy hill-mound, wherein was a cave where the bird made its lair. Its kind had been driven to such hideouts generations ago when its ancestors and evil spirits were defeated by the hero-god Oyna Kamuy who sided with the humans. But such gods have long ascended to heaven, and the huri bird was bent on revenge. Dark clouds form, which the bird would ride to visit violent wind-storms on the land, so that the fish perished, followed by livestock, and many human casualties In a variant telling, its loud wing-beating stirred up winds, which it would ride and fly in all directions, and when overhead its wings covered the sky like rainclouds, enveloping the ground below with shadow.

The shadow or darkness cast over the water is said to be the origin of the place name Kunnai (国縫/訓縫), derived from Ainu kunne meaning "dark, black". For when the furi flew overhead, the skies were overcast for days in the afflicted area. Of course, this is no more than place name legend (folk etymology type toponymy), and the naming probably actually derives from the water or rocks regarded as appearing black.

=== Sumunkur Ainu ===
Another narrative set in antiquity holds that the ancestors of the Sumunkur Ainu, while children, were assaulted by the huri bird (the Sumunkur represent the Ainu of the Pacific Coast, from Iburi to northern Hidaka). The story remembers that Hokkaido at the time was divided into two land masses, east and west. The goddess Kamuy Kakkemat (Note: Japanese: カッケマッ Kakkemat signifies "lady, gentlewoman".) who was ancestor of the western isle on the Sea of Japan coast traveled to the western/northern isle Porosir mosir ("land of the great mountain"), (Note: There is also an actual Mount Poroshiri.) and arriving upon Mount Yūbari, she saw the giant bird huri known to be so large its wing span could block the sun and darken the land. The bird was struggling with what appeared to be flames, but when the goddess shooed the bird away, it turned out the bird had been pinning down a boy and a girl underfoot. The children had come from a place called Shiriya to gather clams. They grew up to become the founders of Sumunkur Ainu. (Note: Reprinted in Nihon Densetsu Taikei (1985), p. 204 which states that the locality where the legend was passed down is uncertain, whereas Nihon Mukashibanashi Tsūkan (1989), p. 623 classifies this as a Hidaka legend.)

=== Tokachi ===
According to the tradition of the Kene-ainu hamlet of Memuro village (Memuro in Kasai District, Tokachi Subprefecture), the hureu made its nest about 6 or 7 ri away, in Kuttari (Note: Part of Tokachi River basin called Kuttari (屈足) region, southern part of Shintoku city.), there was a rugged mountain (Note: Given as rugged rocky mountain called wen-shiri, wen-sir[i]}, but this term literally "bad land" is a common noun meaning "crags; very rocky mountain".), and the nest was referred to as the kamui-roki or "seat of god". This hureu posed no harm to humans, preying on beasts, fish, and whales for food, their bones heaped into mounds next to its drinking spot. For it had its own particular drinking spot at the stream, which it would reach by descendinga a path along the precipice. One time a silly girl trespassed this "God's Seat" area, and skipped across the god's drinking fountain with her skirts lifted up. (Note: In Miyoko Matsutani's retelling, she had gone lily bulb hunting, and entered the drinking spot with muddied feet.) The hureu was enraged by this sacrilege, and picked up the girl and dumped her in a stream a mountain away. The bird left the area never to return. The girl was not killed, and lived to tell about it.

=== Hobetsu ===
In Hobetsu village (now incorporated into Yūfutsu District, Iburi Subprefecture), the furi was a giant bird that caught not only fish, but made humans and beasts its prey, (Note: In Miyoko Matsutani's retelling, the plot of the Tokachi folklore is given as a prelude, and purports it the bird was initially harmless but turned violent due to the incident there, becoming a terror in other places, such as here, until eradicated by the man from Ruikayar (whose phallic size is bowdlerized)) and when it came to live in Atsuma the whole population evacuated to live elsewhere. But the bird was eradicated by a certain man with an enormous penis. (Note: The text uses the oblique termichimotsu (逸物/イチモツ), but the meaning of this is more explicitly explained by Aramata that he has a large penis..)

This furi used to live Hobetsu, and made a habit of perching on a cliff by the Kaikauni (Kaikani) stream, (Note: Appears as カイカウニ沢川 (Kaikani sawagaw) on current map. The Ainu name etymology guessed to be kaye kaure-i ("bend"+"dry place") according to Nagata Hōsei's toponymy work.) on a lookout to hunt the fish swimming upstream to Mu River, so that the people were too afraid to engage in fish-catching. Its lair here was said to be in a cave by a substream of Kaika[u]ni, called huri-usi-nai[?]. When the furi moved on to Nishi Oikarumai (西オイカルマイ), Atsuma, Yūfutsu District. (Note: Also written 西老軽舞. Possibly a contracted form of Oykar-oma-i "place where kudzu vine lies"。), the whole population there abandoned the village and emigrated to a place called Humunke west of Hayakita Station in Abira. The huri was destroyed by an outsider from a place called Ruikayar near Lake Shikotsu; the man because he had such a huge male member, had lost a string of wives, decided as an act of atonement challenged the bird and killed it waving a spear 6 hiro (Note: A hiro is 5 or 6 feet, about 2 meters.) long. The people celebrated him as hero, but the man despaired of living out the rest of his life doing his own cooking and cleaning, so he twisted off his male member and died.

=== Abashiri ===
One folktale relates how one huri was eliminated by a band of men armed with the treasure sword (ipetam) of an Abashiri community, and a second huri (hiwri in the Bihoro dialect) was eliminated by men who borrowed the treasure sword of Bihoro.

=== Saru, Hidaka ===
In the lore of Saru District, Hidaka Subprefecture, the huri was a giant bird, one wing's span measuring 7 ri (about 28km (Note: Although the modern Japanese ri is set at 3.929 kilometres (2.441 mi), in ancient times 1 ri measured only 1/6th that (just as the Qing China li was in the 500+ to 600+ meters range).)). It would appear in human settlements, ruining the crop fields, capturing and feeding on people, attacking wild game as well. The village selected two young men to hunt it, and they gathered 40 deerskins into a bunch to make a giant decoy that tricked the bird into sweeping down, and the men thrust it with their spears into surrender. The bird begged mercy for its life, but the men did not comply and killed it off. The bird paid revenge after rising to heaven by asking the god Hoe (Note: ホウエ.) to bring disaster to the Saru village.

=== Uryū ===
In Uryū, Uryū District is another traditional tale where a decoy is used to lure the giant bird fūryū (フウリュウ). The bird could raise wind with the beating of its wings, and abduct women and children. The youth who vowed to exterminate it asked for a hood and a kosode kimono, which he pulled over a crafted piece of dead wood. When the bird attacked this makeshift scarecrow, the youth cut off the bird's feet. The fūryū screamed, spurting out blood as it fled towards the Mu River. The blood poured like rainfall, and hence the place came to be called Uryū or "rain dragon" (designating this fūryū).

This fūryū allegedly could be found at a place called Matsubara (or the "pine field"), in the interior of the three-way fork of the Uryū River. It was a menace, devouring deer or humans.

=== Asahikawa ===
In the outskirt of Asahikawa lies Chikabumi whose Ainu name (chikap ni, cikap ni) means "bird-tree". According to folklore, a pair of great eagles who made a certain tree here their regular perch for their hare- and deer-hunting, hence the name. But according to a variant, it was a male and female pair of peacocks, yet they were not actually peacocks as such as modern people know them, but actually the giant huri kamuy. The Ainu venerated the birds as god, but the birds were gone before the people knew it. The villagers held to the memory of the divine birds' perch, calling it the chikap ni.

=== Kushiro ===
In a narrative under the title "Tale told by the bird furyū", the giant bird furyū encounters a still yet gigantic monster, the akaei ("Red Ray/Skate"). The proud bird was boastful that humans cowered and hid in fear of it, and it had snatched deer, sea lions, and seals and piled their bones in a high heap. One day it decided to hunt for whale, but the fog forced it to spend the night resting on a tree, and spend the following night in a cave it found. When it thanked the cave, the Red Ray's voice came from the sea-bottom, telling the bird what it thought was a resting-tree had been the giant fish's tentacle, and the cave its nostril. Upon returning to its nest the bird reprimanding itself for its own vanity.

=== Ishikari ===
An onomastic tale concerning Ishikari explains that the name derived from the effort the huri put out with its tail-feathers in a match of strength against the giant octopus monster Rātoshikamui (ラートシカムイ; Ainu romanization unverified). The huri had a single wing's span measuring 7 ri(27.5km).

== Vulture hypothesis ==
Besides the eagle hypothesis, a vulture hypothesis for the huri was proposed by Genzō Sarashina, and as for the presence of vultures in Hokkaido, he recalls that in 1913, a vulture attacked a horse carriage was travelling through Takkobu (達古武) (in Kushiro District) and the man the passenger Morita (Sukejirō, resident of Tottori-chō, outside Kushiro) shot and captured it.

== See also ==
- List of legendary creatures from Japan
- Ipetam - sword said to have destroyed the huri
- Thunderbird – Legendary Indigenous North American creature
- Thunderbird and Whale - Battle between giant bird and whale
- Al-Mi'raj - Iskandar employs decoy to defeat dragon

== Bibliography ==
- Nihon Densetsu Taikei 日本伝説大系. Vol. 1. Mizuumi Shobo. November 1985. ndljp:12501673.
- Inada, Kōji [in Japanese]; Ozawa, Toshio [in Japanese], eds. (December 1989), Nihon Mukashibanashi Tsūkan 日本昔話通観, vol. 1, Dohosha Shuppan, ndljp:12468144
- Sarashina, Genzō [in Japanese]; Watanabe, Shigeru (1952). Hokkaidō no densetsu 北海道の伝説. Kashiwaba Shoin.
- Sarashina, Genzō [in Japanese] (1971). Ainu densetsushū アイヌ伝説集. Kita Shobo. ndljp:12572425.
