= Kamui (2001 manga) =

Japanese manga series

- KAMUI
- Cover of KAMUI volume 1

カムイ
- Genre: Action, fantasy
- Manga
- Written by: Shingo Nanami
- Published by: Square Enix
- English publisher: NA: Broccoli Books
- Magazine: Monthly Stencil; Monthly Gangan Wing
- Original run: 2001 – January 2006
- Volumes: 11

KAMUI (カムイ) is a Japanese manga series written and illustrated by Shingo Nanami. The manga was serialized in the Square Enix's Monthly Stencil magazine, and later serialized in Monthly Gangan Wing.

The English language translation of the manga is published by Broccoli Books.

== Plot ==
In post-apocalyptic Japan, a devastating earthquake called the "Great Sinker" sank 1/3 of the southern islands and cities were destroyed. Monsters known as Atanan appear, creating chaos and fear among the survivors. Youths with supernatural powers fight against the Atanan and control the government-less ruins.

Fearing that the imbalance of the spirits known as the kamui will destroy the Earth, a teenager named Atsuma is sent from his village to retrieve Okikurumi, the sacred kamui, to restore balance and peace. He joins NOA, the organization of youths with supernatural powers, to find Okikurumi and to stop world destruction.

== Characters ==
Atsuma Hasumi (蓮見 敦真, Hasumi Atsuma)
Having no tohsu, or power to communicate with the kamui, he is shunned by his village. He is forced to make a contract with Kojomaru, the spirit of an ancient sword, and sent to EDEN (neo-Tokyo) to retrieve the Okikurumi. Betrayed by someone he once admired, he trusts no one and keeps distanced from others. After spending time at NOA, he begins to trust again, living for the people he cares for. Those people being Shui, Sumire, Anzu, and, once upon a time, Utsuho.
Sumire Senou (瀬能 菫, Senō Sumire)
Second in command at NOA, Commander of the Sky Division. She is infused with the power of the wind. She yearns to be emotionally tied down by the man who found her as a runaway. She brought Atsuma into NOA hoping to witness the miracle of which he speaks. She has an obsession with Utsuho and makes a contract with Kojomaru, after Utsuho pulls him out of Atsuma, to get to Utsuho.
Shui Tachibana (橘 朱衣, Tachibana Shui)
An officer of NOA, infused with the power of fire. He followed his childhood friend who joined NOA and lost her memory. An adept cook, he likes to take care of others, and his voice holds a strange attraction for both Atsuma and Sumire. His voice is also the reason he was able to get close to them. Atsuma slowly comes to think of Shui as a brother and they both care for each other deeply.
Kojōmaru (虎杖丸, Kojōmaru)
The spirit of an ancient sword passed down for generations in Atsuma's village. Despite his age, Kojomaru is very short tempered and immature. He thinks his sole purpose in the series is to protect the Okikurumi. He was separate from Okikurumi, that's why he wants to get him back. This character is loosely based on the hero from an Ainu epic, the Kutune Shirka. His name is an alternate way of pronouncing the story's title, Itadorimaru.
Shiki Kenjou (剣城 紫貴, Kenjō Shiki)
Top commander of NOA. He is determined to make Sumire his, and uses NOA as a cage to keep her within his realm. He, also, work as a researcher for Utsuho before the main story.
Aika Kasuga (春日 藍花, Kasuga Aika)
An officer of NOA, lieutenant of the Sky Division. She has an obsession with Sumire. She also seems to have memory problems, stemming from the effects of being given the Okikurumi.
Yanagi Kuryu (九利生 柳, Kuryū Yanagi)
An officer of NOA, lieutenant of the Earth Division. He is both smart and calculating. Although loyal to Hyde, he keeps in close contact with Shiki. He is later revealed to be working under Utsuho. Unlike most in the series, he has no powers.
Hyde (ハイド, Haido)
Third in command at NOA, Commander of the Earth Division. He is crazy and sadistic, he is obsessed with destruction.
Utsuho Hasumi (蓮見 空穂, Hasumi Utsuho)
Head researcher of the government research facility and the creator of NOA. He took the sacred kamui, Okikurumi from his village. He is Atsuma's brother. He has the same voice as Shui.
Anzu Suzumura (鈴村 杏, Suzumura Anzu)
A teenage cadet of NOA. She joined after her family died in the earthquakes but is actually scared of fighting and only wants to live a normal life. She teaches Atsuma to trust in others. She is attacked by Hyde and confined to the hospital.

== Other media ==
- KAMUI drama CD was released by Frontier Works on December 24, 2004.

Product Number: AFC-3023
Cast
Atsuma - Takahiro Sakurai (櫻井 孝宏)
Shui - Toshiyuki Morikawa (森川 智之)
Sumire - Aya Hisakawa (久川 綾)
Shiki - Katsuyuki Konishi (小西 克幸)
Yanagi - Akira Ishida (石田 彰)
Hyde - Junichi Suwabe (諏訪部 順一)
Aika - Houko Kuwashima (桑島法子)
Anzu - Yui Horie (堀江由衣)
Kojomaru - Romi Park (朴 璐美)
Utsuho - Toshiyuki Morikawa
Utsuho (child) - Mamoru Miyano (宮野 真守)
