= Shin Meikai kokugo jiten =

Japanese dictionary

新明解国語辞典第八版
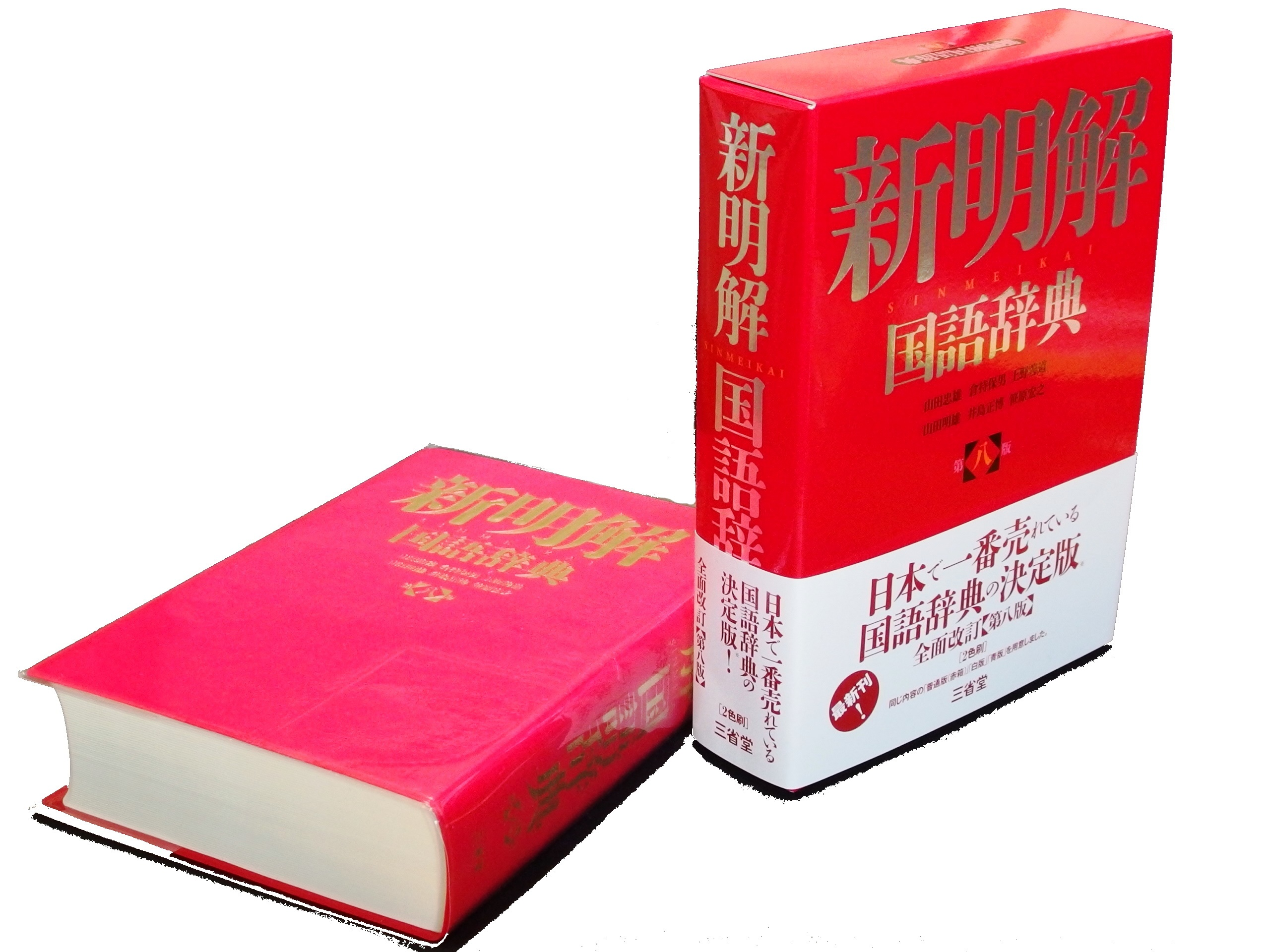
- Shin Meikai kokugo jiten eighth edition
- Editor: Tadao Yamada, Yasuo Kuramochi, Yoshimichi Ueno, Akio Yamada, Masahiro Ijima, Hiroyuki Sasahara
- Language: Japanese
- Genre: Dictionary
- Publisher: Sanseidō
- Publication date: 24 January 1972 (first edition), 19 November 2020 (eighth edition)
- Publication place: Japan
- Pages: 1792
- ISBN: 978-4-385-13078-1
- OCLC: 1229127736
- Website: 【特設サイト】新明解国語辞典第八版

The Shin meikai kokugo jiten (新明解国語辞典; "New clear-understanding Japanese dictionary"), commonly called the Shinmeikai or affectionately the Shinkai-san (新解さん; "Mr/Ms Shinkai", with the personal suffix -san さん), is a popular Japanese dictionary published by Sanseidō. They also publish the analogous Sanseido Kokugo Jiten dictionary, a lexicographical sister that shares several of the same editors.

This Japanese language reference work has frequently undergone revisions and republications. The first two editions were called the Meikai kokugo jiten (明解国語辞典; "Clear-understanding Japanese dictionary"), and the six subsequent ones were published under the current Shin "New" name.

- 1943, 1st edition Meikai kokugo jiten
- 1952, 2nd edition Meikai kokugo jiten
- 1972, 1st edition Shin meikai kokugo jiten
- 1974, 2nd edition Shin meikai kokugo jiten
- 1981, 3rd edition Shin meikai kokugo jiten
- 1989, 4th edition Shin meikai kokugo jiten
- 1997, 5th edition Shin meikai kokugo jiten
- 2005, 6th edition Shin meikai kokugo jiten
- 2011, 7th edition Shin meikai kokugo jiten
- 2020, 8th edition Shin meikai kokugo jiten

The chief editors of the early versions were Kindaichi Kyōsuke (1882-1971), Kindaichi Haruhiko (1913-2004), Kenbō Hidetoshi (見坊 豪紀, 1914-1992), and most notably Yamada Tadao (山田 忠雄, 1916-1996). The 6th edition, which contains some 76,500 entries, still lists Yamada as chief editor, but was edited by Shibata Takeshi (柴田武) and Sakai Kenji (酒井憲二). The Shinmeikai kokugo jiten is one of the most popular dictionaries among high-school students. According to Sanseido, all the editions have collectively sold over 19,500,000 copies.

Following the death of Yamada Tadao, the Shin meikai kokugo jiten acquired a certain notoriety in Japan after the publication of the humorous bestsellers by Akasegawa Genpei (1996, "Mysteries of the Shinkai-san") and Suzuki Makiko (1998, "How to read the Shinkai-san"). They revealed the idiosyncratic nature of many dictionary definitions written by Yamada. In addition to providing a general definition of a word, this editor sometimes added personal commentaries reflecting his experience and philosophy, making the otherwise bland definitions an enjoyable and at times philosophical reading. For example, compare these definitions of ren'ai (恋愛 "love") in a common dictionary and the Shinmeikai:

- Love between a man and a woman, or the feeling one feels in such a situation.
- To feel an affection for an individual of the opposite sex so intense that one would not regret sacrificing anything for that person; the person is constantly on one’s mind, prompting the wish to always be together and share a private world; one feels happy when that desire is satisfied and anxious or depressed should the slightest doubt about that person’s affections arise. (tr. The Japan Forum 2005)

"This is probably the best-selling and most well known of the smaller kokugo dictionaries," writes Gally (1999), "though its fame rests less on its authority than on the quirkiness of its definitions." Based upon Yamada's definitions, Gally describes him as "a misogynist cynic who enjoyed eating fish (many of the definitions of fish names identify the particular fish as tasty, an opinion that may not be shared by all)."
