= Imekanu =

Ainu missionary and epic poet

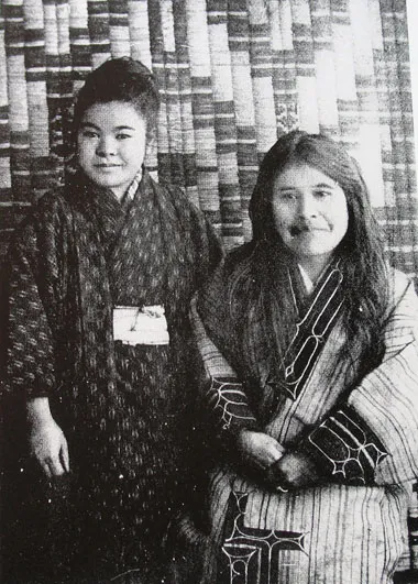
- A picture of Imekanu, right, with her niece Yukie Chiri
- Born: 10 November 1875; Edo, Japan
- Died: 6 April 1961 (aged 85)
- Occupation: Poet
- Known for: Yukar

Imekanu (イメカヌ; November 10, 1875 – April 6, 1961), also known by her Japanese name Kannari Matsu (金成 マツ), was an Ainu missionary and epic poet. Along with her niece, Yukie Chiri, she wrote down and preserved numerous Ainu yukar she learned from her mother.

== Life and work ==
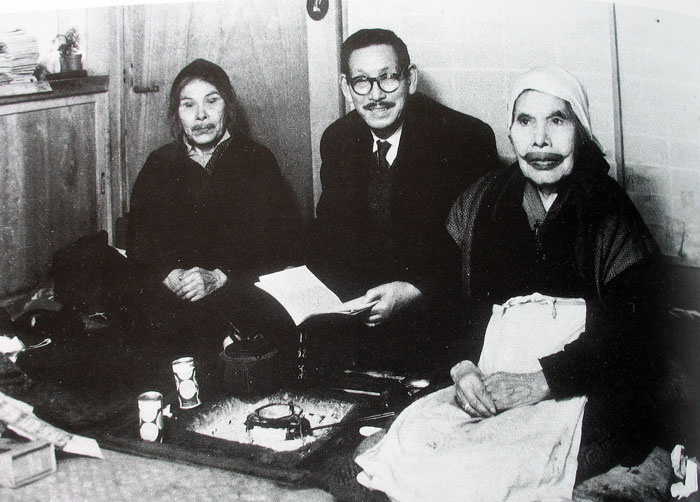
Imekanu, left, with Kindaichi Kyōsuke and Imekanu's sister Nami Kannari

Imekanu belonged to an Ainu family of Horobetsu in Iburi Subprefecture, Hokkaidō, Japan. She began to learn her repertoire of Ainu poetry from her mother, Monashinouku, a seasoned teller of Ainu tales who spoke very little Japanese. After converting to Christianity, Imekanu worked for many years for the Anglican Church in Japan as a lay missionary under the missionary John Batchelor, well known for his publications on Ainu language and culture. Batchelor introduced Imekanu to Kindaichi Kyōsuke, the most prominent Japanese scholar in this field, in 1918.

After retiring from missionary work in 1926, Imekanu began to write down yukar known to her from Ainu tradition and continued to do so until her death. These texts in the Horobetsu dialect of Ainu amounted to 20,000 pages in 134 volumes. 72 of these volumes were destined for Kindaichi and 52 volumes for Imekanu's nephew Chiri Mashiho, a researcher specializing in Ainu linguistics.

Chiri Yukie, Imekanu's niece and Chiri Mashiho's sister, grew up with Monashinouku and Imekanu, and she learned many of the Ainu yukar along with them. She wrote down thirteen yukar from this tradition, translated them into Japanese, and prepared a bilingual edition which appeared in 1923. This was the first publication of Ainu traditions by an Ainu author. Three of these yukar later appeared in English translation, alongside works by others, in Donald L. Philippi's Songs of Gods, Songs of Humans (1979).

Kindaichi published Imekanu's version of the epic Kutune Shirka, alongside a version by Nabesawa Wakarpa, with commentary, in his two-volume study of the Ainu yukar in 1931. He published a seven-volume collection of Imekanu's epics, with his own Japanese translations, in 1959–1966.

== Bibliography ==
- Kindaichi, Kyōsuke (1931). Ainu jojishi yūkara no kenkyū. (2 vols.)
- Kindaichi, Kyōsuke (1959–1966). Ainu jojishi yūkara shū. (7 vols.)
- Philippi, Donald L. (1979). Songs of Gods, Songs of Humans: The Epic Tradition of the Ainu. University of Tokyo Press. ISBN 0-691-06384-2. (Biography of Imekanu, p. 19; translations from Chiri Yukie's materials, pp. 89, 108, 137.)
- Chiri, Yukie (1923). Ainu shin'yō shu.
