= Shingo Nanami =

Japanese manga artist

Shingo Nanami 七海 慎吾
- Area: Manga artist
- Notable works: Kamui

Shingo Nanami (Japanese: 七海 慎吾, Hepburn: Nanami Shingo) is a Japanese manga artist. Her debut work was a one-volume manga, titled Tennen Yūryōji. Many of her works are serialized in Square Enix magazines. Her series Kamui was translated and published in English by Broccoli Books in 2005. Her latest series, Sengoku Strays, was featured in the inaugural issue of Square Enix's new magazine, Gangan Joker. According to her English-language publisher, Nanami is ambidextrous, but draws her manga only with her left hand.

== Works ==
Title	Year	Notes	Refs
Ten'nen yūryō-ji (天然優良児, Natural good children)	2000	Serialized in Monthly Stencil, 1 vol.	
Kamui	2001–06	Serialized in Monthly Stencil and Monthly Gangan Wing; Published by Square Enix, 11 volumes	
Sengoku Strays	2008–14	Serialized in Monthly Gangan Wing and Monthly Gangan Joker; Published by Square Enix, 15 volumes	
