= Tawara =

Tawara may refer to:

== Places ==
- Tawara, Ivory Coast, a village in Savanes District, Ivory Coast
- Tawara, Iwate, Esashi District, Iwate, Japan
- A village on Motorina Island, Papua New Guinea

== People ==
- Magoichi Tawara (1869-1944), Japanese statesman, Japanese minister of commerce and industry.
- Kuniichi Tawara^{(ja)} (1872-1958), Japanese metallurgist.
- Sunao Tawara (1873–1952), Japanese pathologist known for the discovery of the atrioventricular node.
- Machi Tawara (born 1962), Japanese writer, translator and poet.
- Nobuyuki Tawara (born 1964), Japanese cyclist.

== Other uses ==
- Aschoff-Tawara node, another name for the atrioventricular node
- Twara clan, descended from the Japanese Toki clan
- Tawara language, a Bantu language spoken in Mozambique
- Bales which make of straw (ja:俵) used to cereals, potato kinds, and charcoal packegeing, and convert use to mark the boundaries of a Dohyō (sumo wrestling ring)

== See also ==
- Tarawa, an atoll in Kiribati
- South Tarawa, capital of Kiribati
- Tarawa-class amphibious assault ship, operated by the United States Navy
