= Yukie Chiri =

Japanese transcriber and translator

- 知里 幸恵
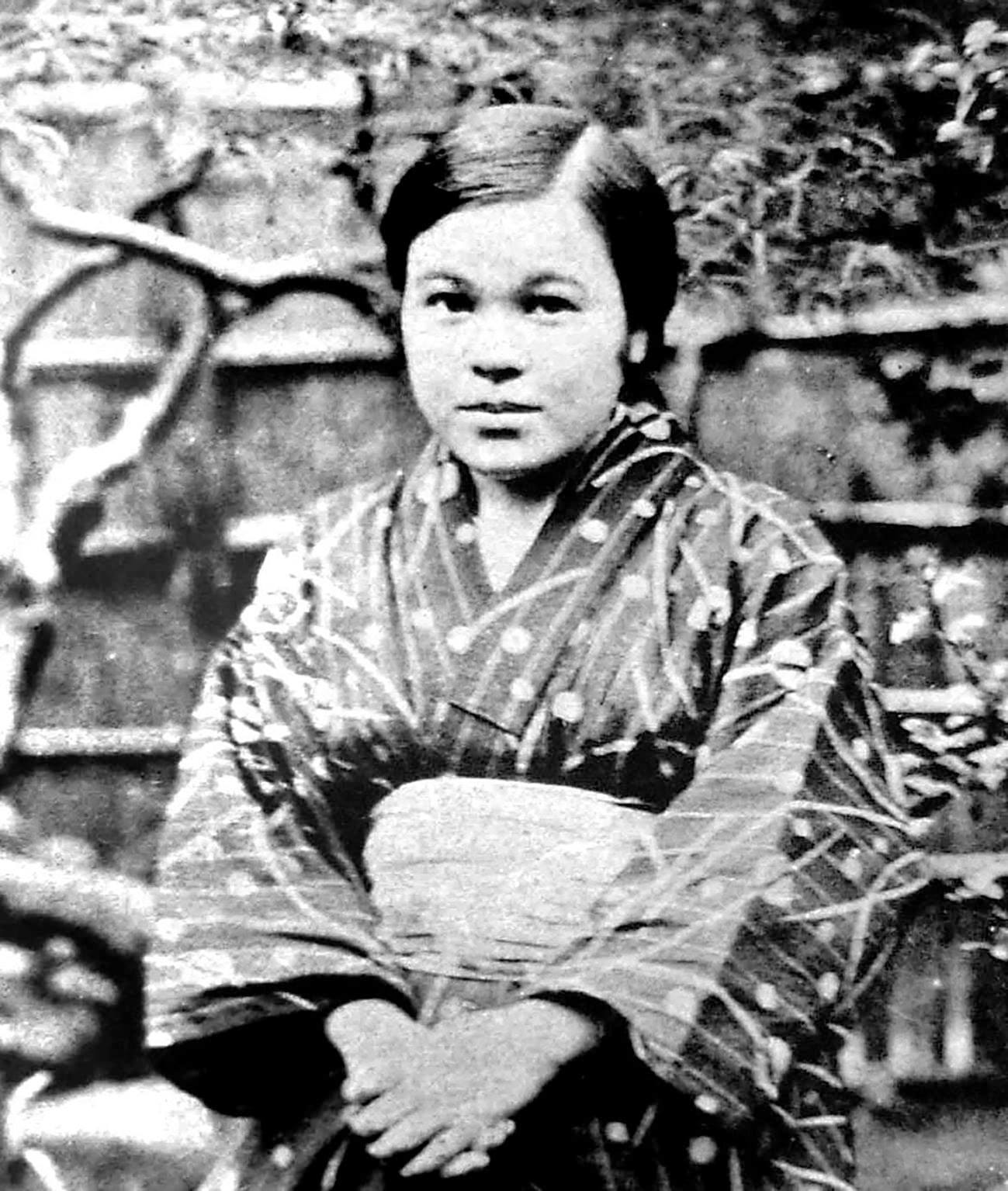
- Yukie Chiri
- Born: June 8, 1903; Noboribetsu, Hokkaidō
- Died: September 18, 1922 (aged 19); Tokyo, Japan
- Relatives: Chiri Mashiho (brother); Imekanu (aunt)

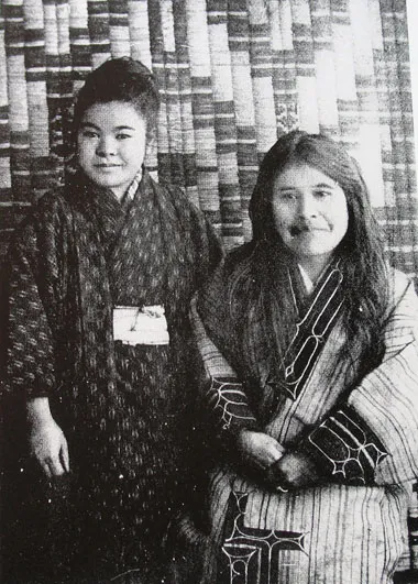
Yukie Chiri, left, with her aunt Imekanu

Yukie Chiri (知里 幸恵, Chiri Yukie; June 8, 1903 – September 18, 1922) was an Ainu transcriber and translator of Yukar (Ainu epic tales).

== Life ==
Yukie Chiri was born into an Ainu family in Noboribetsu, Hokkaidō during the Meiji era. Her father was Takakichi Chiri who had served in the Russo-Japanese War and was one of three Ainu awarded the Order of the Golden Kite, her mother was Nami. At the time, the colonial government of Hokkaido rapidly increased immigration of ethnic Japanese people to Hokkaidō, forcibly relocating many Ainu communities and depriving them of their traditional means of livelihood. The Meiji government adopted extensive policies designed to discourage or ban Ainu cultural practices while encouraging or forcing their assimilation into Japanese society. By the turn of the century, some Ainu writers came to argue that assimilation was the only viable method of survival for Ainu communities.

Chiri was sent to her aunt Imekanu in Chikabumi, on the outskirts of Asahikawa, when she was six years old, presumably to lessen the financial burden on her parents. Imekanu lived with her aged mother, Monashinouku, a seasoned teller of Ainu tales who spoke very little Japanese. Chiri thus grew to be completely bilingual in Japanese and Ainu, and had a familiarity with Ainu oral literature that was becoming less and less common by that time. Although she had to endure bullying in school, she excelled in her studies, particularly in language arts. However, due to anti-Ainu prejudice, she suffered from an ethnic inferiority complex that afflicted many of her generation.

Chiri's personal conception of cultural assimilation was complex. In one letter written during her teens, she remarked, "In a twinkling the natural landscape as it had been since the ancient past has vanished; what has become of the folk who joyfully made their living in its fields and mountains? The few of us fellow kinspeople who remain simply stare wide-eyed, astonished by the state of the world as it continues to advance."

== Work ==
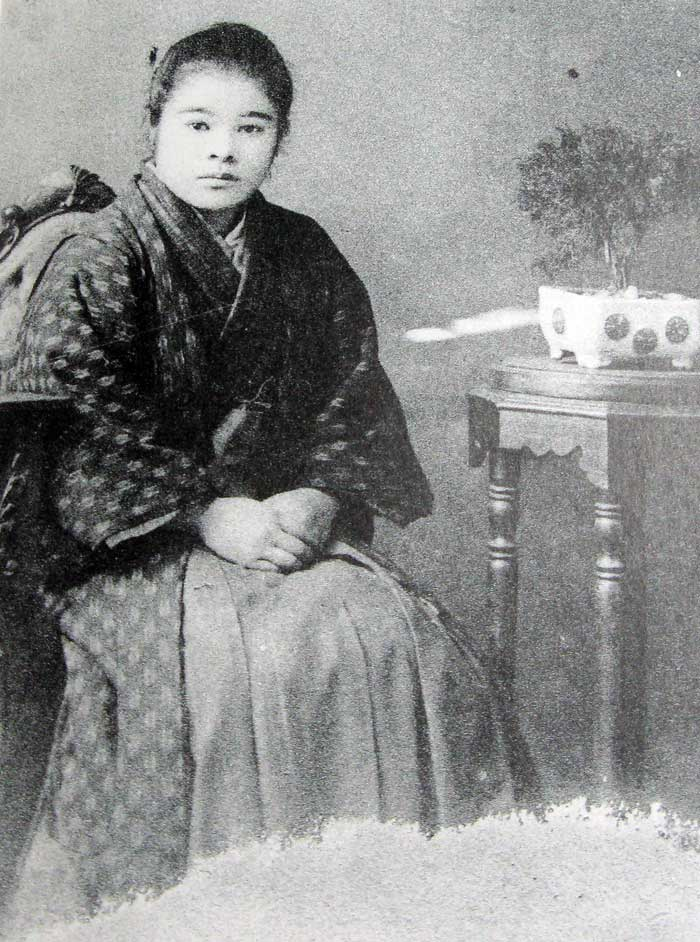

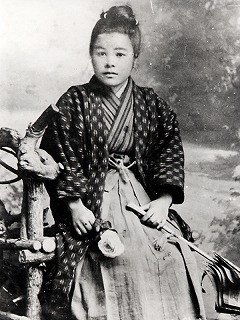

Chiri was in her mid-teens when she first met Japanese linguist and Ainu language scholar Kyōsuke Kindaichi during the nation's Taishō period. He was traveling around Hokkaidō in search of Ainu transmitters of oral literature, and had come to seek out Imekanu and Monashinouku. Upon meeting Chiri, who was still living with Imekanu, Kindaichi immediately recognized her potential and spoke to her about his work. When Kindaichi explained the value he saw in preserving Ainu folklore and traditions to Chiri, she decided to dedicate the rest of her life to studying, recording, and translating yukar.

Kindaichi eventually returned to Tokyo, but sent Chiri blank notebooks so she could record whatever came to mind about Ainu culture and language. She chose to record the tales her grandmother chanted, using romaji to express the Ainu sounds, and then translated the transcribed yukar into Japanese. Eventually, Kindaichi persuaded her to join him in Tokyo to assist him in his work collecting and translating yukar. However, only months after arriving in Tokyo and on the same night she completed her first yukar anthology, she suddenly died from heart failure at the age of 19.

== Legacy ==
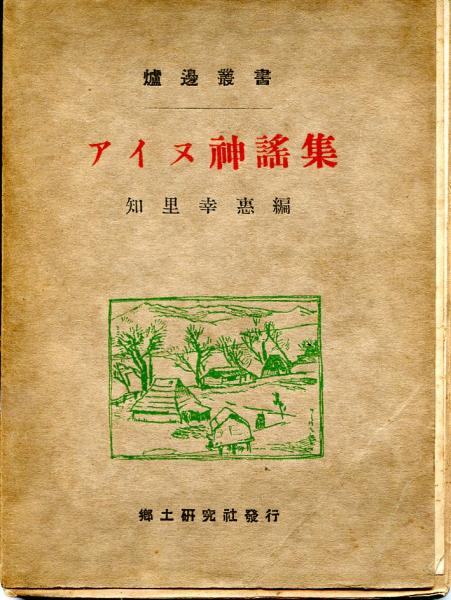
A Collection of the Ainu Epics of the gods

Chiri's anthology was published the following year under the title Ainu Shinyōshū (A Collection of the Ainu Epics of the gods). Although her patron Kindaichi and series editor Kunio Yanagita must have taken the late Chiri's manuscript to press, they did not put their names anywhere on it; the preface and content are written entirely by her. Her book contains both Japanese translations and, invaluably, the original Ainu, in Roman script. It received great popular acclaim in the period press, creating a newfound respect for Ainu culture among Japanese readers, and remains the most important source for yukar today.

Her younger brother, Chiri Mashiho, later pursued his education under Kindaichi's sponsorship and became a respected scholar of Ainu studies. Both Chiri and her younger brother were secretly sponsored by Keizo Shibusawa, heir of Shibusawa Eiichi, through anonymous donations. Imekanu also continued the work of transcribing and translating yukar.
