= Hayakita Station =

Railway station in Abira, Hokkaido, Japan

Coordinates: 42.7658°N 141.8146°E

Hayakita Station 早来駅
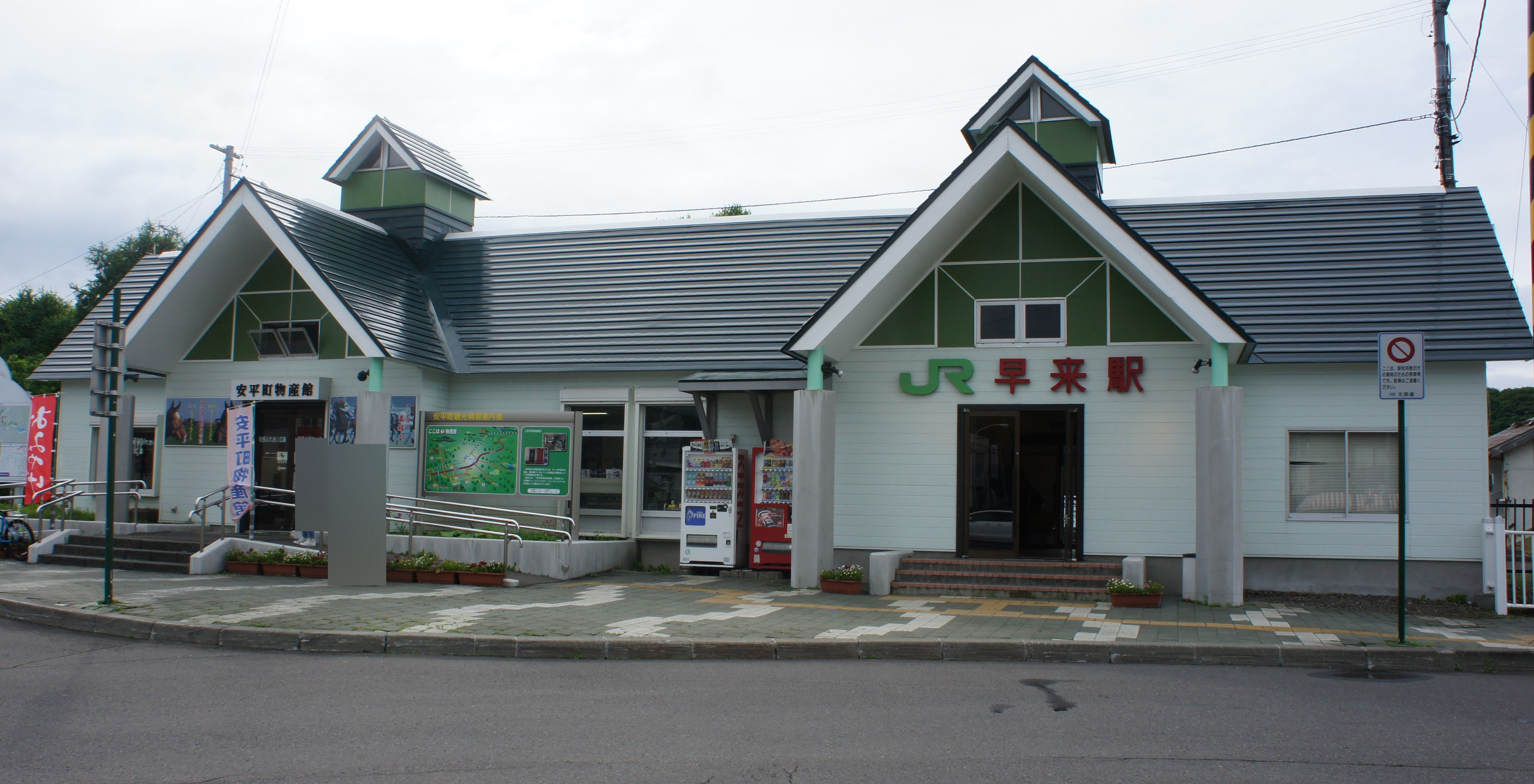
- Station building, July 2017

General information
- Location: Abira, Hokkaido; Japan
- Operator: JR Hokkaido
- Line: ■ Muroran Main Line
- Distance: 158.3 km from Oshamambe
- Platforms: 2 side platforms
- Tracks: 2

Other information
- Status: Staffed

History
- Opened: August 1, 1984
Location

Hayakita Station (早来駅, Hayakita-eki) is a train station in Abira, Yūfutsu District, Hokkaidō, Japan.

== Lines ==
Hayakita Station is served by the Muroran Main Line.

== Station layout ==
The station has two ground-level opposed side platforms connected by a footbridge, serving two tracks. Kitaca is not available.

== Adjacent stations ==
«	Service	»
Muroran Main Line
Toasa	-	Abira
