= Haruhiko Kindaichi =

Japanese lexicographer

- Born: April 3, 1913; Tokyo, Japan
- Died: March 19, 2004 (aged 90)
- Occupation: linguist
- Relatives: Kyōsuke Kindaichi (father)

Haruhiko Kindaichi (金田一 春彦, Kindaichi Haruhiko; 1913–2004) was a Japanese linguist and a scholar of Japanese linguistics (国語学, kokugogaku). He was well known as an editor of Japanese dictionaries and his research in Japanese dialects and accents. He was awarded the Order of the Rising Sun for his efforts. He was awarded a Doctor of Literature degree at Tokyo University in 1962. He was given official commendation as someone who has performed special service in the field of culture and an honorary citizen of the Tokyo Metropolitan District.

== Early life ==
He was born on April 3, 1913, at his mother's home in Morikawa-cho, Hongo Ward, Tokyo City (now Hongo 6-chome, Bunkyō Ward, Tokyo Metropolitan District). He was the eldest and only son of Shizue (née Hayashi) and noted linguist Kyōsuke Kindaichi, an expert on the Ainu language.

He took after his father in his enthusiasm for learning and his mother in her secularism. When their son was born, his father had lost his job as a proofreader of the Sanseidō encyclopaedia, so his family was in dire economic straits. His father eventually worked as a professor at Tokyo Imperial University.

== Work ==
Haruhiko became known to the broader public with the publication of his book Nihongo (The Japanese Language) in 1957, which became a bestseller for its anecdotal approach to the nature of the language. He went on, like Susumu Ōno, to become a familiar public intellectual, appearing often on radio and television to discuss linguistic issues.

== Awards ==
- Medals of Honor (Japan) (1977)
- Order of the Rising Sun, 3rd class (1986)
- Person of Cultural Merit (1997)
- Order of the Sacred Treasure, 2nd class (2004)
