= Yaeko Batchelor =

Ainu waka poet and evangelist

- バチェラー八重子
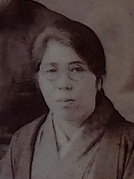
- Born: June 13, 1884; Date, Hokkaido
- Died: April 29, 1962 (aged 77); Kyoto

Yaeko Batchelor (バチェラー八重子; June 13, 1884 – April 29, 1962) was an Ainu waka poet and evangelist.

== Life ==
Yaeko Batchelor was born on June 13, 1884, in Usu, Date City, Hokkaido. Her name was entered into the family register as Yaeko Mukai (向井八重子), and her childhood name was Fuchi. Her father was Mukai Tomizō (向井富蔵), a member of a powerful Ainu family, and whose Ainu name was Morotcaro (モロッチャロ). Her mother was named Hutchise (フッチセ). Among Yaeko's five siblings was the Anglican pastor Yamao Mukai. Yaeko's father deeply trusted the Anglican missionary John Batchelor, and allowed Yaeko to be baptized. However, when Yaeko was 11, her father died. When she was 13, she set out for Sapporo to attend the Ainu Girls' School that Batchelor operated, and later advanced to St. Hilda's School in Tokyo.

In 1906, when Yaeko was 22, she was adopted by John Batchelor and his wife Louisa. January in 1909 Yaeko accompanied the pair on a trip to England, and was commissioned as a lay evangelist by the Archbishop of Canterbury. She pursued this mission in Biratori and Noboribetsu. In 1912, she went with her adopted father to Sakhalin to spread her faith there.

In 1931, a collection of her tanka poems entitled For the Young Ainu (若きウタリに, Wakaki utari ni) was published. Her adoptive mother Louisa died in 1936, and was buried in Maruyama Cemetery in Sapporo. Her adoptive father John Batchelor died in 1944. Yaeko stored about 250 of his books and some of his other items in her home after his death.

Yaeko Batchelor died on 29 April 1962, in Kyoto while visiting there, at the age of 77.

== Bibliography ==
- Kakegawa, Genichirō (March 20, 1988). バチラー八重子の生涯 [The Life of Yaeko Batchelor]. Hokkaido Shuppan Kiga Center (北海道出版企画センター). ISBN 978-4832888012.
