= Mashiho Chiri =

Ainu lexicographer (1909–1961)

- 知里 真志保
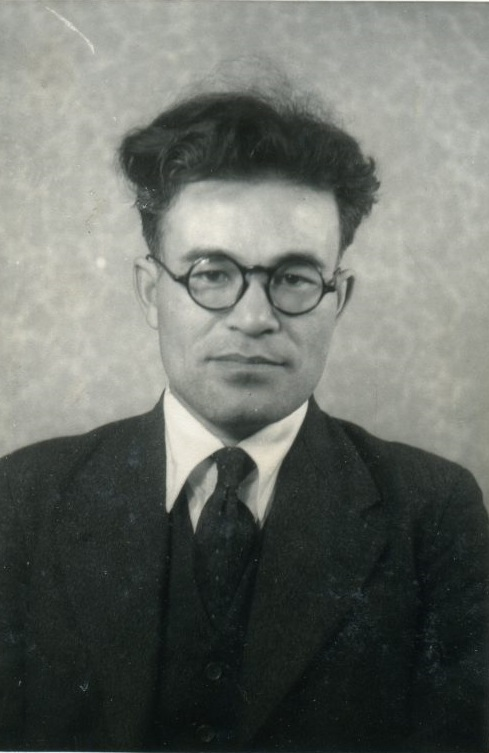
- Born: February 24, 1909; Noboribetsu, Hokkaido, Japan
- Died: June 9, 1961 (aged 52)
- Awards: 1954 Asahi Prize

Academic background
- Education: Tokyo Imperial University

Academic work
- Discipline: Linguist, anthropologist
- Sub-discipline: Ainu language
- Institutions: Hokkaido University

Mashiho Chiri (Japanese: 知里 真志保; February 24, 1909 – June 9, 1961) was an Ainu linguist and anthropologist. He was best known for creating Ainu-Japanese dictionaries.

== Biography ==
Chiri was born on February 24, 1909, in what is now Noboribetsu, Hokkaido, Japan. His father was Takakichi Chiri who had served in the Russo-Japanese War and was one of three Ainu awarded the Order of the Golden Kite, his mother was Nama. His older sister is Yukie Chiri and his aunt is Imekanu. Though they were both native Ainu speakers, Chiri was not. He was taught Japanese, and learned the Ainu language when he was in high school.

He graduated from the Hokkaido Muroran Sakae High School. He had excellent grades, but couldn't afford go to college. Instead he worked at a local government office. Later, Kindaichi Kyosuke recognized his intelligence and invited Chiri to stay at his house in Tokyo and attend the First Higher School, Japan. Chiri took him up on his offer, and graduated in 1933. He then studied at the Tokyo Imperial University and graduated from the literature department in 1937. He was the first Ainu to enter the university. He earned a master's degree at the same university. Chiri taught at a girls' school and researched at a museum in Karafuto for three years before taking a temporary position at Hokkaido University in 1943. He became a full professor in 1947, and was awarded a doctorate in linguistics on December 22, 1954 focusing on the Karafuto dialect of Ainu.

== Ainu language ==
Chiri's academic work focused on the Ainu language. He won the 1954 Asahi Prize for writing a classified Ainu language dictionary. He worked with Yamada Hidezo to study the Ainu names for places, eventually creating an Ainu place name dictionary that helped to give a better understanding of place names in Hokkaido.

Chiri also translated Ainu stories, which were passed down orally because the Ainu did not have a written language. His translation style was meant to reflect the performative nature of how the stories were told, and he did this by writing them in colloquial Japanese and improvising. He also translated certain words like "vagina" and "ejaculation" into German in order to avoid censorship, though they were written using katakana in his translations. This style was criticized by later scholars for summarizing content and adding new sentences, and some re-translated his work in a more traditional style.

== Selected bibliography ==
- 分類アイヌ語辞典. Tokyo: Nihon Jōmin Bunka Kenkyūjo. 1954.
- アイヌ文学. Tokyo: Gengensha. 1955.
- Ezo obake retsuden. Sapporo: Puyara Shinsho Kankōkai. 1961.
