= Kutune Shirka =

Sacred epic of the Ainu

The Kutune Shirka (Ainu: クツ゚ネシㇼカ), known in Japanese as Itadorimaru no Kyoku (虎杖丸の曲) or simply Itadorimaru (虎杖丸), is a sacred yukar epic of the native Ainu people of Japan. The Ainu title refers to a magic sword wielded by the story's protagonist. It is one of the most important, if not the most important, piece of Ainu literature. There have been several translation efforts since its compilation, into Japanese and other languages.

== Background ==
Like most epics, the plot of the Kutune Shirka is long and covers many events. This yukar is approximately 10,000 words long.

The epic itself tells the tale from a first-person narrative, as is usual in Ainu oral tradition, where the storyteller takes on the role of the protagonist. Like other Ainu epics, the Kutune Shirka is recited with a rhythm of two stressed beats per line. This was enacted by the reciter, who would tap a stick every beat.

== Plot ==
The story begins with the setting of the hero's home. One day, the hero hears news of a golden sea otter. It is revealed to him that an unnamed figure has put a bounty on the capture of the golden otter. Whoever catches the otter would receive the unnamed figure's sister as a bride, along with much treasure as dowry. Many men from different tribes and locales travel to the otter's home and attempt to capture it, under the watchful eye of a red-haired hag. The hero succeeds in catching the otter, and brings it back to his home. This, however, stirs jealousy amongst the other tribes, and the rest of the poem deals with the battles and conflicts fought amongst them. The hero is aided by his magic sword which assists him throughout his struggles.

The poem ends somewhat abruptly, and it is uncertain if this was intentional. By comparing with its earlier sections, linguistic evidence seen in the last few lines suggest the beginning of a new episode in the saga. However, no other known version of the Kutune Shirka progresses any further in the story. Arthur Waley, one of the poem's translators, felt that the yukar seems to "break off" rather than come to an end.

The sea otter is a significant figure in Ainu culture and mythology, and are found only at the northern tip of Japan, where the Ainu reside.

== History ==
The Kutune Shirka was likely to have originated throughout Ainu history in the form of oral literature. The Ainu had a strong oral culture, and were well known for reciting folktales and epics in prose.

The modern version of the Kutune Shirka was first recorded by Japanese linguistics professor Kyōsuke Kindaichi in the 1920s. Kindaichi had heard the epic from an old, blind Ainu man by the name of Nabesawa Wakarpa. When asked about the ballad's origins, Wakarpa denied any hand in its creation and stated that he had only recited what he had heard from others before him. Wakarpa died before the Kutune Shirka was published in 1932. As such, there is no credible way to calculate the epic's age. Arthur Waley suggests a broad estimate of anywhere between the 9th and 20th centuries.

== Translations ==
The first translations of the Kutune Shirka was penned by the Ainu transcriber Imekanu, also known by her Japanese name Matsu Kannari. Professor Kyōsuke Kindaichi then recorded the version heard from Nabesawa Wakarpa, and published this version together with Imekanu's version in 1932. Imekanu's transcription in original Ainu is a vital specimen of the Ainu language, and was examined extensively in Kindaichi's later publications concerning Ainu grammar and syntax. In 1951, it was translated into English by Arthur Waley, and published in the Italian literary journal Botteghe Oscure.

== See also ==
- Yukar
- Ainu language
