= Sanseido =

Japanese publishing company

Sanseido Co., Ltd. 株式会社三省堂
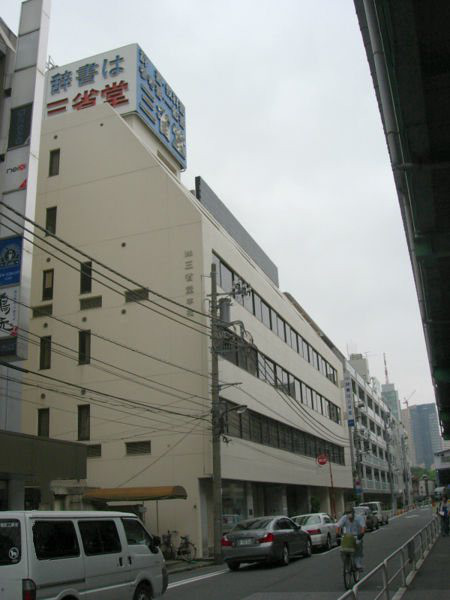
- Sanseidō headquarters in Tokyo
- Type: Business corporation
- Industry: Publishing
- Founded: 1881
- Headquarters: Tokyo, Japan
- Key people: TAKIMOTO, Takashi (瀧本多加志), President
- Products: Dictionaries, textbooks and other publications
- Number of employees: 100
- Website: https://www.sanseido-publ.co.jp/

Sanseido Co., Ltd. (株式会社三省堂, Kabushiki-gaisha Sanseidō) is a Japanese publishing company known for publishing dictionaries and textbooks.

The headquarters is situated in the area between Suidōbashi Station and Kanda River, at a location previously used as a warehouse for the company's own printing plant.

== History ==
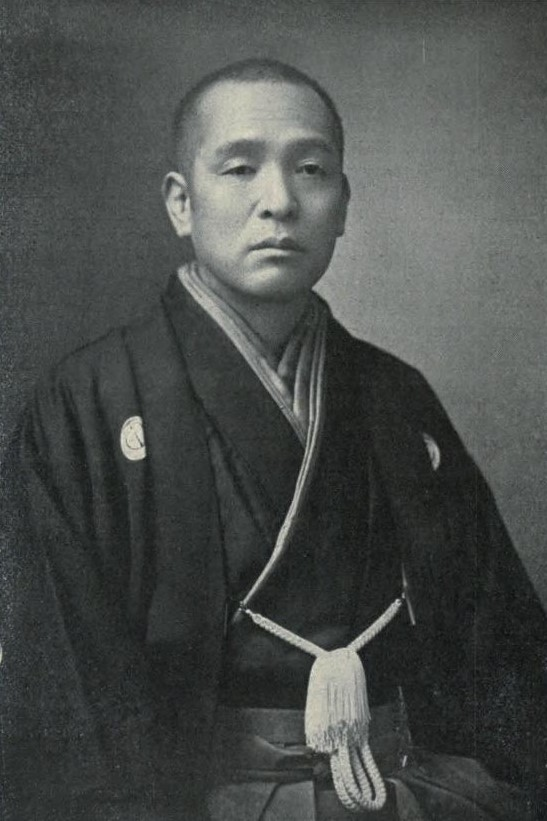
Sanseidō founder Tadakazu Kamei

The company was founded in 1881 by Tadakazu Kamei, a member of the old Hatamoto family, as the secondhand bookshop Sanseidō Bookstore Ltd.. It entered the publishing business in 1884.

From the outset, the company focused its business on academic fields, publishing dictionaries, encyclopedias, textbooks, and for a period, maps, as well as selling educational materials. While its rival in the field of dictionary publishing at the time, Fuzanbō, focused on large, specialist-oriented dictionaries, Sanseidō concentrated on smaller but more practical dictionaries. For this purpose, the company opened its own printing plant in 1889.

On October 18, 1912, two months after the publication of Nihon Hyakka Daijiten's sixth edition, the company went bankrupt. This came as a surprise to the company's employees and general public considering the prevalence of the company's dictionaries across the country. In 1915, at the suggestion of Tadakazu's son, Torao, who was a university student at the time and had a background in economics and accounting, the publishing business and bookstore would be separated. He would later go on to join the company after graduation, later becoming president in July 1930.

In the late 1970s, the company's publishing business was in a slump, and soon the company went bankrupt before reviving again in 1881 with the printing division spinning off as SANSEIDO Printing Co., Ltd..

== Publication characteristics ==
=== Japanese-language dictionaries ===
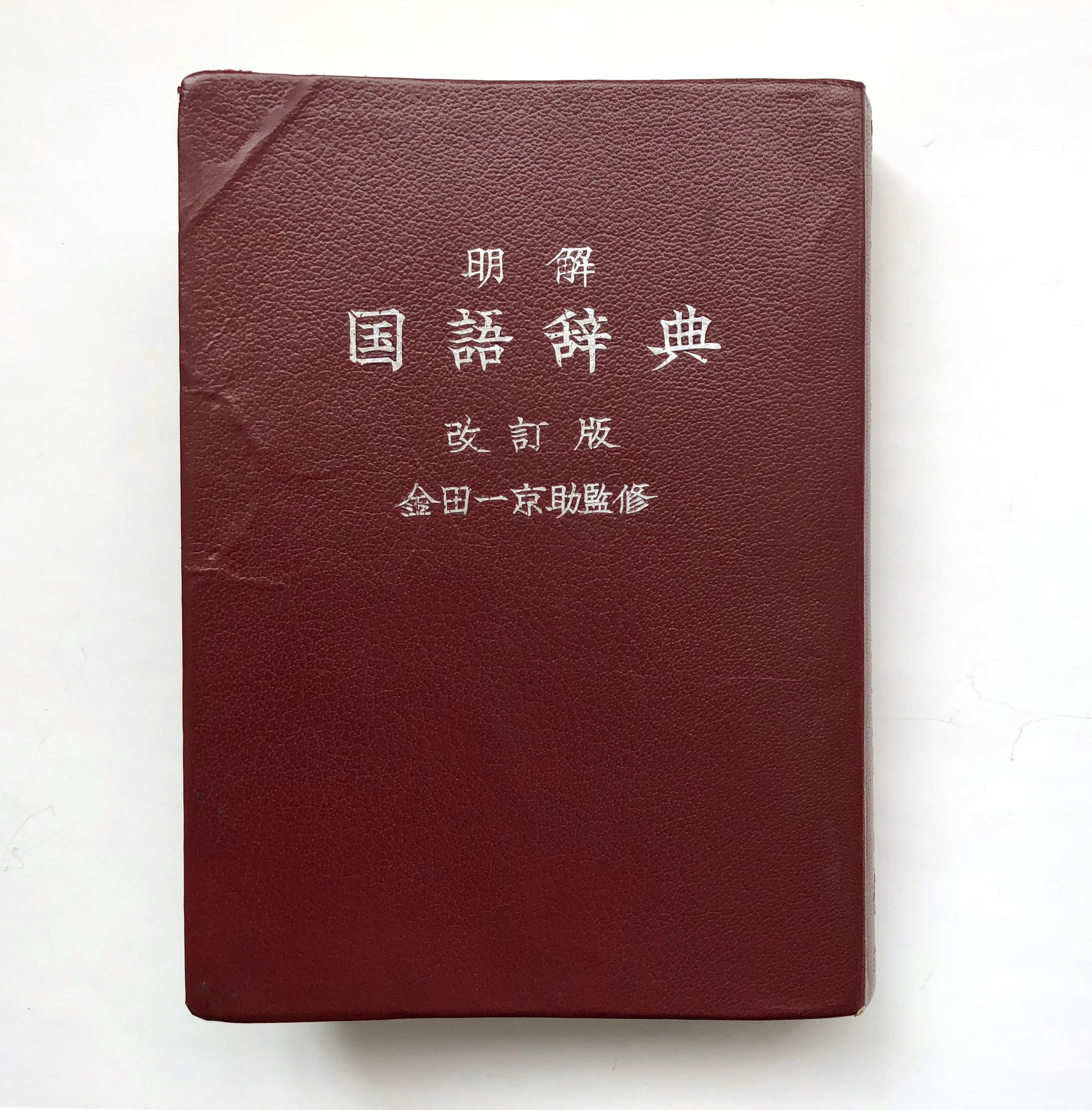
Shin Meikai kokugo jiten revised edition

Shin Meikai kokugo jiten is the highest-selling Japanese-language dictionary in Japan, and is well known for its unique and straightforward definitions and examples. It was compiled almost single-handedly by chief editor Tadao Yamada, and his ideas are strongly reflected in the dictionary. Yamada had previously worked alongside Hidetoshi Kenbou on its predecessor, Meikai kokugo jiten. Kenbou would later become editor of Sanseido Kokugo Jiten.

While working together on Meikai kokugo jiten, the two conflicted in the direction they wished the dictionary to go, resulting in the creation of the two new dictionaries following. The philosophy behind Shin Meikai kokugo jiten would prefer to retain older words, even if had begun to fall out of common use, and its text didn't hesitate to give lengthy explanations. Sanseido kokugo jiten on the other hand's philosophy desired to keep explanations concise, hoping to include as many new words as possible.

Daijirin competes with Iwanami Shoten's Kōjien in the market share for single volume dictionaries, and is known for its thoroughness and abundance of modern and katakana words. Kōjien however is superior when it comes to classical works and dialects.

Shouzaburou Kanazawa's Koujirin was a medium-sized Japanese-language dictionary that has somewhat faded into obscurity, but saw extensive popularity in the period before World War II throughout Japan and Korea. Japanese author and poet Yukio Mishima described Koujirin as his favorite Japanese-language dictionary, using it until it was tattered. While he regularly used Kōjien in tandem, he was more accustomed to Koujirin.

=== English-Japanese dictionaries ===
Sanseidō's Concise English-Japanese Dictionary was commonly used for a long period from the late 1800s through to the mid 1900s.

The Wisdom was compiled based on Sanseidō's existing corpus and released in 2003, later revised in late 2006 and released as a web dictionary.

=== Japanese encyclopedias ===
Today, Heibonsha and Gakken are well known as publishers of encyclopedias, but the first Japan-specific encyclopedic dictionary was Ōkuma Shigenobu's Nihon Hyakka Daijiten, published in ten volumes between 1908 and 1919. Shigenobu described the importance of an encyclopedia as being the barometer of a country's culture. A garden party was held at the Shigenobu's residence in Waseda to celebrate the publication. The party was attended by many people from the political and business world, including Shibusawa Eiichi. Tadakazu Kamei's son-in-law, Seisuke Saitou, was in charge of editing the encyclopedia. While originally planned to be published in one volume, the enthusiasm of the various writers caused it to be expanded to six volumes. The publishing cost was so high that Sanseidō went bankrupt after publishing the sixth volume due to lack of funds, but the company was able to rebuild and eventually release its tenth volume.

== Notable publications ==
=== Dictionaries ===
- Daijirin : Japanese dictionary
- Sanseido Kokugo Jiten : Japanese dictionary
- Shin Meikai kokugo jiten : Japanese dictionary
