= Yukar =

Genre of Ainu oral literature

Yukar (Ainu: ユカㇻ) are Ainu sagas that form a long rich tradition of oral literature. In older periods, the epics were performed by both men and women; during the 19th and early 20th centuries, when Ainu culture was in decline, women were generally the most skillful performers. Traditional tales describe floating worlds with Ainu mosir, or the land of the humans (as opposed to kamuy mosir, the land of the gods), resting on the back of a fish whose movements cause earthquakes.

== Translation history ==
Professor Kyōsuke Kindaichi collected yukar and translated them into Japanese.

In August 2006, the Asahi Shimbun reported in its article that Japan's Agency of Cultural Affairs (Bunkacho) would discontinue funding by fiscal year 2007 of the project to translate and transcribe the yukar compilations of Imekanu, Kannari Matsu Notebooks (金成マツノート, Kan-nari Matsu Nōto), which consists of 92 yukar stories written in romaji with the tenth story lost and 49 stories left untranslated. It is said that the stoppage was because of Shigeru Kayano's death in May 2006.

In 1999, a multi-national group of educators and translators established "Project U-e-peker" with the intention of making more Ainu folktales available in English. They have produced English versions of two of Kayano's books under the titles The Ainu: A Story of Japan's Original People (Tuttle Publishing 2004) and The Ainu and the Fox (RIC Publications 2006). Future projects include picturebook English versions of the yukar recorded in Ainu Shin'yōshū (アイヌ神謡集), an anthology of stories from the Ainu oral tradition which were first put into writing and translated into the Japanese language by Chiri Yukie (1903–1922), the niece of Kannari Matsu, an invaluable assistant to Kindaichi until she died at the age of 19.

Books which relate the epic songs of the Ainu in English include Chiri Yukie's Ainu Shin'yōshū, translated by Sarah M. Strong in 2011 and Benjamin Peterson of Project Okikirmui in 2013, and Songs of Gods, Songs of Humans: The Epic Tradition of the Ainu by Donald L. Philippi. The Project Okikirmui collection contains 13 yukar, while Philippi translates 35 epics, all of them originally recorded by women, the majority by Imekanu. Strong's text contains the thirteen yukar of the Ainu Shin'yōshū, as well as Chiri's original preface and background on her working relationship with Kindaichi. The Ainu epic Kutune Shirka is a major example of the yukar style.

== Common themes in yukar narratives ==
The trade and parents' death are two common themes in yukar.

=== Trade ===
The trade happens between the Ainu and the Wajin, which refers to the ethnic Japanese. The trade between both sides persisted from the 14th century to the middle of the 19th century. This long-term trade with Wajin becomes a common theme in the yukar narrative. There are a variety of risks associated with trading activities, including conflicts with foreigners, assaults by inland invading foes, and troubles in Wajin town. In the Ainu language, trade with the Wajin is referred to as uymam. The Ainu-Wajin trade began as a friendship trade. However, this relationship changed as Wajin aimed to control and rule Ainu through trade.

There are two story patterns about trade:

1. The trade-difficulty pattern. It is about heroes stumbling into a problem in a Wajin town. However, the protagonists manage to overcome those difficulties and become wealthy in the end.
2. The trade-murder pattern. It is about heroes getting murdered in a Wajin town.

Both story patterns are about the risk and danger associated with trading. The difference is whether or not the main protagonists can solve these problems. In the first story pattern, the story's ending reveals that all problems are resolved, and the heroes live long lives. They become wealthy and successful. In the second pattern, some of the key characters in story are killed. One hero survives and has the responsibility of carrying on their family line.

=== Parents' death ===
Another theme in yukar is the parents' death. In the epic story, the protagonists lose both parents at a young age. These hero characters in yukar survive by themselves or through the help of gods in the Ainu culture. When the orphan grows up, their action of starting the trade with outsiders is regarded as heroic in yukar. The danger from the trade is closely related to the parent's death in yukar.

=== "The Story of a Wolf God Who Saved Pon Otasutunkur and His Son" ===
The yukar "The Story of a Wolf God Who Saved Pon Otasutunkur and His Son" reveals both themes of trade and parents' death. It illustrates the connection between two themes the risks of trade and parents' death.

The protagonist Pon Otastunkur is an orphan. His parents both pass away. He is raised in the village by an old man whose true identity is the wolf god. When Pon Otastunkur is old enough, the wolf god brings him to the Wajin town to conduct trade. The daughter of the Wajin town's ruler falls in love with Pon Otastunkur and marries him. They leave Wajin town and return to the village together. One day, people from another village start the battle with Pon Otastunkur to steal his money gained from trading with Wajin. Unfortunately, Pon Otastunkur and his wife both die in this battle. Their son loses both parents and repeats the same destiny as his father. The same wolf god raises the son of Pon Otastunku and brings him to the Wajin town to conduct trade. At the end of the story, they successfully rescue and heal the village from the damage.

== Depiction of animals and nature ==
Yukar are all narrated in the first person. Some stories describe the world through animal perspectives, such as owls, wolves and foxes. Besides animals, all things in the natural world can deliver their voice in the story, including the rivers, valleys and seas. The first-person narrative of animals and nature shows the Ainu people's powerful imagination.

The observation and creation of nature in literature emerge from their generations of hunting, gathering and fishing experiences in nature. It is very different from Western science's perspective of the natural world, which is distanced and objective. Ainu people first participate in nature and then depict the creatures they see and their living environment. In the yukar narrative, the repeated rhythmic phrase imitates a cry, scream, gnawing, or slithering of the animal spirits. It also mimics behaviour such as a snake moving through the grass. Hirame Karepia's recitation of the chironnupu kamui (fox spirit) yukar has a refrain that begins with the sound pau. It is the traditional onomatopoeic presentation of a fox's cry in Ainu culture.

== See also ==
- Ainu music
- Ainu religion
- Joik – Sami folk songs
- Rekilaulu – a Finnish "sleigh song"
- Kamuy
