= John Batchelor (missionary) =

English missionary and anthropologist (1855–1944)

John Batchelor OBE
- Archdeacon
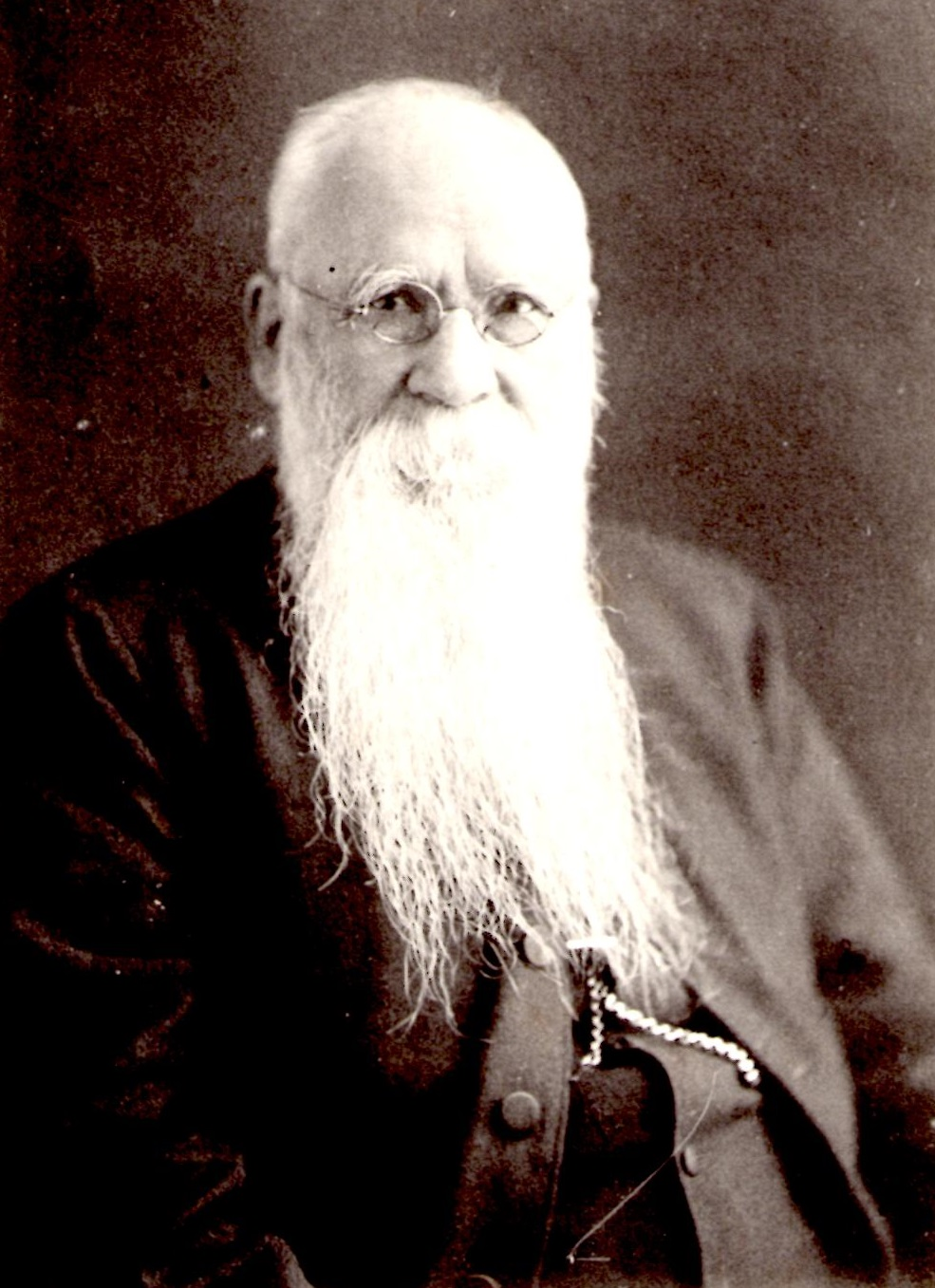
- Batchelor in 1928

Personal details
- Born: 20 March 1855 Uckfield, Sussex, England
- Died: 2 April 1944 (aged 89) Hertford, Hertfordshire, England
- Denomination: Church of England
- Spouse: Louisa Andrews (m. 1884; died 1936)
- Children: Yaeko
- Occupation: Missionary; translator
- Education: Church Missionary Society College, Islington

John Batchelor OBE (20 March 1855 – 2 April 1944) was an English archdeacon and missionary to the Ainu people of Japan until 1941. First sent under the auspices of the Church Missionary Society of the Church of England, Batchelor lived from 1877 to 1941 among the indigenous Ainu communities in the northern Japanese island of Hokkaido. He was a charismatic and iconoclastic missionary for the Anglican Church in Japan and published highly regarded work on the language and culture of the Ainu people. Batchelor reluctantly left Japan at the outbreak of the Second World War in the Pacific in 1941.

== Early life and missionary career ==
John Batchelor was born in Uckfield, East Sussex son of William Batchelor, a local tailor and parish clerk. Batchelor attended Uckfield Grammar School and with the support of the Reverend E. T. Cardale was accepted as a candidate for study at the Church Missionary Society College, Islington.

On 22 September 1875, Batchelor set out with a group of Church Missionary Society (CMS) missionaries for Hong Kong. Arriving in Hong Kong on 11 November 1875, he immediately set about studying the Chinese language. While in Hong Kong, Batchelor fell ill to malaria and hearing that the climate in Hokkaido was similar to his native England left for Hokkaido. He left Hong Kong on 31 May 1877, then on 16 July he boarded a freight ship to Hakodate from Yokahama. In Hakodate he was assigned as a junior to the senior missionary Walter Dening of the CMS, settling in the city's Motomachi district. In Hakodate, he had his first encounter with the Ainu.

=== Missionary career ===
- 1877 – Batchelor moved to Hokkaido.
- 1884 – Batchelor married Louisa Andrews, who had a young brother, Walter, who was working as a missionary in Hakodate.
- 1886 – Batchelor moved to the new house in April. That summer, a British Japanologist Basil Hall Chamberlain (1850–1935), professor at Tokyo Imperial University, visited Batchelor's house to write on Ainu and stayed with Batchelor for three weeks. Batchelor took Chamberlain to Ainu villages, which was beneficial to the publishing of a book on Ainu.
- 1889 – Batchelor wrote Japanese Ainu in English and published Ainu-English-Japanese dictionary.
- 1891 – Batchelor and his colleague Lucy Payne of Anglican Church founded Harutori Ainu school in Kushiro. The same year, he moved to Sapporo.
- 1895 – a church was constructed at Biratori, the other at near Mount Usu in Hokkaido.
- 1896 – Batchelor sent an English nurse and missionary Mary Briant to Biratori. She stayed in Japan for 22 years.
- 1906 – Batchelor and his wife adopted a young Ainu woman, Yaeko (1884–1962).
- 1908 – Bachelor went to Sakhalin to preach with Yaeko after the Russo-Japanese War.
- 1909 – Bachelor, his wife, and Yaeko temporarily visited England via Vladivostok by the Siberia Railway.
- 1936 – Batchelor's wife Louisa died at the age of 91.
- 1941 – Batchelor returned to England.

== Views on the treatment of the Ainu communities ==
Batchelor harshly criticised the Japanese for their cruel treatment of the Ainu. He once said, "I'm past eighty, and probably that accounts for it. But I've been told I'm the only foreigner in Japan who can tell the Japanese exactly what I think of them and get away with it."

The Japanese forced the Ainu from their land and forbade them to practice their traditions and culture, Ainu were not allowed to hunt for food, speak the Ainu language, or obtain an education, being forcefully segregated in small villages. After Japan realised they could exploit the Ainu they reversed their policy, Batchelor said "The Japanese treat them better now, simply because they came to realize that the Ainu were a valuable curiosity worth preserving. There was no kindness or sentiment in it — none whatever. They quit trying to exterminate this shattered relic of a dying Caucasian race when visitors with money to spend began coming from all over the world just to see and study them. If today the Ainu are protected wards of the Government, and if the Government has paid me any honor, it is not because of a change of heart on the part of the Japanese; it is only because the Ainu became worth something to Japan." During the era of Samurai in Japan, Ainus had to grovel and smear their face on soil when they met a Japanese soldier, or face immediate decapitation. Japan also forbade the ownership of weapons among the Ainu.

Batchelor wrote extensively, both works about the Ainu language and works in Ainu itself.

== Selected works ==
- John Batchelor (1905). An Ainu-English-Japanese dictionary: (including A grammar of the Ainu language.) (2nd reprint ed.). Tokyo: Methodist publishing house. pp. 525.
- Basil Hall Chamberlain, John Batchelor (1887). Ainu grammar. "Japan Mail" Office, Yokohama: Imperial University. pp. 174.
- John Batchelor (1892). The Ainu of Japan. London: Religious Tract Society. pp. 341.
- John Batchelor (1897). 聖書・新約: アイヌ. Bible society's committee for Japan. p. 706.
- John Batchelor (1896). 聖書・新約: アイヌ. Bible society's committee for Japan. p. 313.
- John Batchelor (1896). Ainu Karisia Eiwange Gusu an Inonno-itak Oma Kambi (The Book of Common Prayer in Ainu). London: S. P. C. K.
- John Batchelor, Church Missionary Society (1902). Sea-girt Yezo: glimpses of missionary work in North Japan. Clerkenwell, E.C.: Church Missionary Society. pp. 120.
- John Batchelor, Kingo Miyabe (1898). Ainu economic plants. Transactions of the Asiatic Society of Japan. Vol. 21. Yokohama: R. Meiklejohn & Co. p. 43.
- John Batchelor, Japanese Central Association (1893). An itinerary of Hokkaido, Japan, Volume 1. Tokyo: Hakodate Chamber of Commerce. p. 28.
- John Batchelor (1904). The Koropok-Guru or pit-dwellers of north Japan, and, A critical examination of the nomenclature of Yezo, Volume 19. Yokohoma: Japan Mail. p. 18.
- John Batchelor (1892). The Ainu of Japan: The Religion, Superstitions, and General History of the Hairy Aborigines of Japan. London: Religious Tract Society. pp. 336.
- John Batchelor (1901). The Ainu and their folk-lore. London: Religious Tract Society. pp. 603.

== See also ==
- Akkorokamui
- Imekanu
