= Kyōsuke Kindaichi =

Japanese linguist (1882–1971)

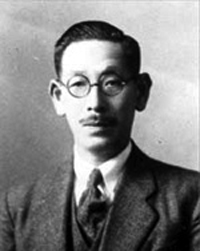
- Born: March 5, 1882; Iwate Prefecture, Empire of Japan
- Died: November 14, 1971 (aged 89); Tokyo, Japan
- Resting place: Tokyo
- Occupation: linguist
- Relatives: Haruhiko Kindaichi (son)

Japanese name
- Kanji: 金田一 京助
- Hiragana: きんだいち きょうすけ
Transcriptions
- Romanization: Kindaichi Kyōsuke

Kyōsuke Kindaichi (金田一 京助, Kindaichi Kyōsuke; May 5, 1882 – November 14, 1971) was a Japanese linguist, chiefly known for his dictations of yukar, or sagas of the Ainu people, as well as his study of the Matagi dialect. He is the author of the dictionary Meikai Kokugo Jiten.

== Biography ==
Kindaichi was born in Morioka, Iwate Prefecture. His son Haruhiko Kindaichi was also a prominent linguist. He was active as a poet and had good contacts with Ishikawa Takuboku.

== In popular culture ==
A fictionalised Kindaichi appears in the anime Woodpecker Detective's Office.

== Honours ==
- Order of Culture (1954)
- Order of the Sacred Treasure, 1st class, Grand Cordon (1971, Posthumous award)
- Junior Third Rank (1971, Posthumous award)
