= Language revitalization =

Effort to promote an endangered language or revive a dead language

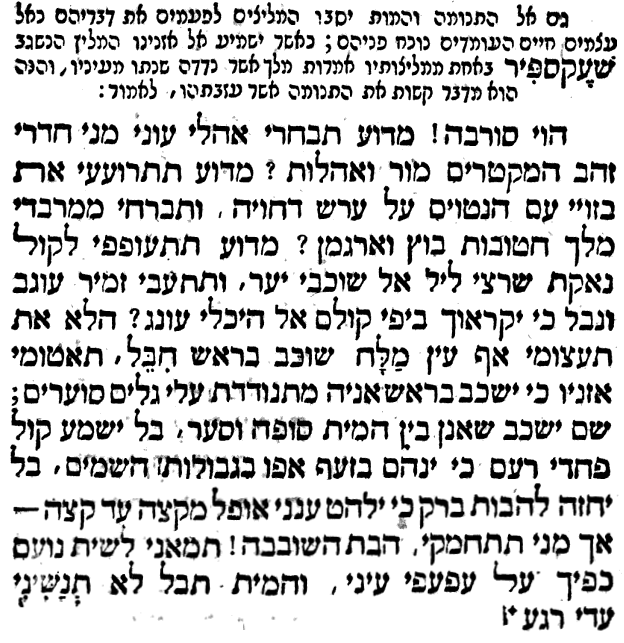
Hebrew translation of the "Are at this hour asleep!" monologue from Henry IV, Part 2 by Solomon Löwisohn, 1816. The revitalization of Hebrew is the only successful example of language revival.

Language revitalization, also referred to as language revival or reversing language shift, is an attempt to halt or reverse the decline of a language or to revive an extinct one. Those involved can include linguists, cultural or community groups, or governments. Some argue for a distinction between language revival (the resurrection of an extinct language with no existing native speakers) and language revitalization (the rescue of a declining or moribund language).

Languages targeted for language revitalization include those whose use and prominence is severely limited. Sometimes various tactics of language revitalization can even be used to try to revive extinct languages. Though the goals of language revitalization vary greatly from case to case, they typically involve attempting to expand the number of speakers and use of a language, or trying to maintain the current level of use to protect the language from extinction. Language revitalization can face significant barriers, not the least of which can come from governments, such as a general lack of support or funding for the projects, or a system that may actively repress the minority language. Other barriers could be a lack of speakers, a lack of relevant teaching material, or vocabulary loss.

Reasons for revitalization vary: they can include physical danger affecting those whose language is dying, economic danger such as the exploitation of indigenous natural resources, political danger such as genocide, or cultural danger/assimilation. For example, between first contact with Europeans and around 2000, it is thought that the number of Indigenous languages in Canada fell from 450 to 60 and in Australia from 250 to 145. In 2012, the UN estimated that more than half of the languages spoken had fewer than 10,000 speakers and that a quarter had fewer than 1,000 speakers—and that, without some efforts to maintain them, most of these would become extinct within a century. These figures are often cited as reasons why language revitalization is necessary to preserve linguistic diversity. Culture and identity are also frequently cited reasons for language revitalization, when a language is perceived as a unique "cultural treasure". A community often sees language as a unique part of its culture, connecting it with its ancestors or with the land, making up an essential part of its history and self-image. Endangered or at risk languages can be elevated by making them into a national language, for example the Quechua language of Peru.

Language revitalization is also closely tied to the linguistic field of language documentation. In this field, linguists try to create a complete record of a language's grammar, vocabulary, and linguistic features. The task of documentation is often taken on with the goal of revitalization in mind, or can otherwise encourage concern for revitalization.

== Reasons for language endangerment ==
Language endangerment can occur for a variety of reasons, though one of the most common is colonialism. In 2006, it was estimated that around 30%-50% of languages might vanish within the following century. Language-loss is often the result of genocide, cultural assimilation, and discrimination leading to fewer native speakers. Other reasons may be illiteracy, poverty, or human-rights violations. In 2015, 560 Indigenous languages were in use in Latin America, but about one fifth of Indigenous people had lost their ancestral native language(s) during "recent decades". In the Caribbean, nearly all Indigenous languages have disappeared. Colonial powers have used discriminatory educational practices against Indigenous languages; in 20th-century Mexico, schools taught almost exclusively Spanish, in an attempt to assimilate Indigenous Mexicans into a uniform Mexican identity; similarly, institutions in the United States and Canada forcibly assimilated Indigenous children, banning all Indigenous languages, and "operated under a mission of linguicide".

Creole languages also face endangerment. "Creoles" are often typically formed via the mixing of two or more distinct languages, and are often, but not always formed from so-called "pidgin" languages. Furthermore, Creoles have historically been formed due to colonialism; perhaps the most common instance of Creole languages being used is in former plantation colonies. Creole languages have historically been suppressed in favor of the colonizing language; in St. Lucia, where the majority of the people spoke a Creole language (St. Lucian Kwéyòl), English was made the only national language. Globalization poses a threat to the continued use of Creoles; as Errington (2003) argues, globalization's sociolinguistic impact restrict the ability for Creole and other marginalized languages to survive by creating a climate in which already dominant languages are valued.

== Degrees of language endangerment ==
=== UNESCO Language Vitality and Endangerment framework ===
Uses a six-point scale is as follows:

- Safe: All generations use language in a variety of settings.
- Stable: Multilingualism in the native language and one or more dominant language(s) has usurped certain important communication contexts.
- Definitively Endangered: spoken by older people; not fully used by younger generations.
- Severely Endangered: Only a few adult speakers remain; no longer used as a native language by children.
- Critically Endangered: The language is spoken only by grandparents and older generations.
- Extinct: There is no one who can speak or remember the language.

=== Other scales ===
Another scale for identifying degrees of language endangerment is used in a 2003 paper ("Language Vitality and Endangerment") commissioned by UNESCO from an international group of linguists. The linguists, among other goals and priorities, create a scale with six degrees for language vitality and endangerment. They also propose nine factors or criteria (six of which use the six-degree scale) to "characterize a language's overall sociolinguistic situation". The nine factors with their respective scales are:

1. Intergenerational language transmission
  - safe: all generations use the language
  - unsafe: some children use the language in all settings, all children use the language in some settings
  - definitively endangered: few children speak the language; predominantly spoken by the parental generation and older
  - severely endangered: spoken by older generations; not used by the parental generation and younger
  - critically endangered: few speakers remain and are mainly from the great grandparental generation
  - extinct: no living speakers
2. Absolute number of speakers
3. Proportion of speakers within the total population
  - safe: the language is spoken by approximately 100% of the population
  - unsafe: the language is spoken by nearly but visibly less than 100% of the population
  - definitively endangered: the language is spoken by a majority of the population
  - severely endangered: the language is spoken by less than 50% of the population
  - critically endangered: the language has very few speakers
  - extinct: no living speakers
4. Trends in existing language domains
  - universal use (safe): spoken in all domains; for all functions
  - multilingual parity (unsafe): multiple languages (2+) are spoken in most social domains; for most functions
  - dwindling domains (definitively endangered): mainly spoken in home domains and is in competition with the dominant language; for many functions
  - limited or formal domains (severely endangered): spoken in limited social domains; for several functions
  - highly limited domains (critically endangered): spoken in highly restricted domains; for minimal functions
  - extinct: no domains; no functions
5. Response to new domains and media
  - dynamic (safe): spoken in all new domains
  - robust/active (unsafe): spoken in most new domains
  - receptive (definitively endangered): spoken in many new domains
  - coping (severely endangered): spoken in some new domains
  - minimal (critically endangered): spoken in minimal new domains
  - inactive (extinct): spoken in no new domains
6. Materials for language education and literacy
  - safe: established orthography and extensive access to educational materials
  - unsafe: access to educational materials; children developing literacy; not used by administration
  - definitively endangered: access to educational materials exist at school; literacy in language is not promoted
  - severely endangered: literacy materials exist however are not present in school curriculum
  - critically endangered: orthography is known and some written materials exist
  - extinct: no orthography is known
7. Governmental and institutional language attitudes and policies (including official status and use)
  - equal support (safe): all languages are equally protected
  - differentiated support (unsafe): primarily protected for private domains
  - passive assimilation (definitively endangered): no explicit protective policy; language use dwindles in public domain
  - active assimilation (severely endangered): government discourages use of language; no governmental protection of language in any domain
  - forced assimilation (critically endangered): language is not recognized or protected; government recognized another official language
  - prohibition (extinct): use of language is banned
8. Community members' attitudes towards their own language
  - safe: language is revered, valued, and promoted by whole community
  - unsafe: language maintenance is supported by most of the community
  - definitively endangered: language maintenance is supported by much of the community; the rest are indifferent or support language loss
  - severely endangered: language maintenance is supported by some of the community; the rest are indifferent or support language loss
  - critically endangered: language maintenance is supported by only a few members of the community; the rest are indifferent or support language loss
  - extinct: complete apathy towards language maintenance; prefer dominant language
9. Amount and quality of documentation.
  - superlative (safe): extensive audio, video, media, and written documentation of the language
  - good (unsafe): audio, video, media, and written documentation all exist; a handful of each
  - fair (definitively endangered): some audio and video documentation exists; adequate written documentation
  - fragmentary (severely endangered): limited audio and video documentation exists at low quality; minimal written documentation
  - inadequate (critically endangered): only a handful of written documentation exists
  - undocumented (extinct): no documentation exists

== Theory ==
One of the most important preliminary steps in language revitalization/recovering involves establishing the degree to which a particular language has been "dislocated". This helps involved parties find the best way to assist or revive the language.

=== Steps in reversing language shift ===
There are many different theories or models that attempt to lay out a plan for language revitalization. One of these is provided by celebrated linguist Joshua Fishman. Fishman's model for reviving threatened (or sleeping) languages, or for making them sustainable, consists of an eight-stage process. Efforts should be concentrated on the earlier stages of restoration until they have been consolidated before proceeding to the later stages. The eight stages are:

1. Acquisition of the language by adults, who in effect act as language apprentices (recommended where most of the remaining speakers of the language are elderly and socially isolated from other speakers of the language).
2. Create a socially integrated population of active speakers (or users) of the language (at this stage it is usually best to concentrate mainly on the spoken language rather than the written language).
3. In localities where there are a reasonable number of people habitually using the language, encourage the informal use of the language among people of all age groups and within families and bolster its daily use through the establishment of local neighbourhood institutions in which the language is encouraged, protected and (in certain contexts at least) used exclusively.
4. In areas where oral competence in the language has been achieved in all age groups, encourage literacy in the language, but in a way that does not depend upon assistance from (or goodwill of) the state education system.
5. Where the state permits it, and where numbers warrant, encourage the use of the language in compulsory state education.
6. Where the above stages have been achieved and consolidated, encourage the use of the language in the workplace.
7. Where the above stages have been achieved and consolidated, encourage the use of the language in local government services and mass media.
8. Where the above stages have been achieved and consolidated, encourage use of the language in higher education, government, etc.

This model of language revival is intended to direct efforts to where they are most effective and to avoid wasting energy trying to achieve the later stages of recovery when the earlier stages have not been achieved. For instance, it is probably wasteful to campaign for the use of a language on television or in government services if hardly any families are in the habit of using the language.

Additionally, Tasaku Tsunoda describes a range of different techniques or methods that speakers can use to try to revitalize a language, including techniques to revive extinct languages and maintain weak ones. The techniques he lists are often limited to the current vitality of the language. He claims that the immersion method cannot be used to revitalize an extinct or moribund language. In contrast, the master-apprentice method of one-on-one transmission on language proficiency can be used with moribund languages. Several other methods of revitalization, including those that rely on technology such as recordings or media, can be used for languages in any state of viability.

A method's effectiveness depends on the language's viability.
Method	Degree of endangerment		
	Weakening	Moribund	Dead/extinct
Immersion	effective	ineffective	ineffective
Neighborhood	effective	ineffective	ineffective
Bilingual	effective	ineffective	ineffective
Master–apprentice	effective	effective	ineffective
Total physical response	effective	effective	ineffective
Telephone	effective	effective	ineffective
Radio	effective	effective	effective
Multimedia	effective	effective	effective
Two-way	effective	effective	effective
Formulaic	effective	effective	effective
Artificial pidgin	effective	effective	effective
Place name	effective	effective	effective
Reclamation	effective	effective	effective
Adoption	effective	effective	effective

=== Factors in successful language revitalization ===
David Crystal, in his book Language Death, proposes that language revitalization is more likely to be successful if its speakers:

- increase the language's prestige within the dominant community;
- increase their wealth and income;
- increase their legitimate power in the eyes of the dominant community;
- have a strong presence in the education system;
- can write down the language;
- can use electronic technology.

In her book, Endangered Languages: An Introduction, Sarah Thomason notes the success of revival efforts for modern Hebrew and the relative success of revitalizing Māori in New Zealand (see § Specific examples). One notable factor these two examples share is that the children were raised in fully immersive environments. In the case of Hebrew, it was on early collective-communities called kibbutzim. For the Māori language In New Zealand, this was done through a language nest.

Furthermore, the production of educational materials in an at-risk language can be a factor in increasing the numbers of speakers: Navajo and Hawaiian, in collaboration with native speakers and educators, were added to the language platform Duolingo in 2018. This action allowed a greater number of people to engage with and learn the languages when previously there were little or no educational materials available. However, some concerns were raised by native speakers over the accuracy of Duolingo's material.

=== Revival linguistics ===
In 2011, Ghil'ad Zuckermann proposed "Revival Linguistics" as a new linguistic discipline and paradigm.

Zuckermann's term "Revival Linguistics" is modelled upon "Contact Linguistics". Revival linguistics inter alia explores the universal constraints and mechanisms involved in language reclamation, renewal and revitalization. It draws perspicacious comparative insights from one revival attempt to another, thus acting as an epistemological bridge between parallel discourses in various local attempts to revive sleeping tongues all over the globe.

According to Zuckermann, "revival linguistics combines scientific studies of native language acquisition and foreign language learning. After all, language reclamation is the most extreme case of second-language learning. Revival linguistics complements the established area of documentary linguistics, which records endangered languages before they fall asleep."

Zuckermann proposes that "revival linguistics changes the field of historical linguistics by, for instance, weakening the family tree model, which implies that a language has only one parent."

There are disagreements in the field of language revitalization as to the degree that revival should concentrate on maintaining the traditional language, versus allowing simplification or widespread borrowing from the majority language.

==== Compromise ====
Zuckermann acknowledges the presence of "local peculiarities and idiosyncrasies" but suggests that

there are linguistic constraints applicable to all revival attempts. Mastering them would help revivalists and first nations' leaders to work more efficiently. For example, it is easier to resurrect basic vocabulary and verbal conjugations than sounds and word order. Revivalists should be realistic and abandon discouraging, counter-productive slogans such as "Give us authenticity or give us death!"

Nancy Dorian has pointed out that conservative attitudes toward loanwords and grammatical changes often hamper efforts to revitalize endangered languages (as with Tiwi in Australia), and that a division can exist between educated revitalizers, interested in historicity, and remaining speakers interested in locally authentic idiom (as has sometimes occurred with Irish). Some have argued that structural compromise may, in fact, enhance the prospects of survival, as may have been the case with English in the post-Norman period.

==== Traditionalist ====
Other linguists have argued that when language revitalization borrows heavily from the majority language, the result is a new language, perhaps a creole or pidgin. For example, the existence of "Neo-Hawaiian" as a separate language from "Traditional Hawaiian" has been proposed, due to the heavy influence of English on every aspect of the revived Hawaiian language. This has also been proposed for Irish, with a sharp division between "Urban Irish" (spoken by second-language speakers) and traditional Irish (as spoken as a first language in Gaeltacht areas). Ó Béarra stated: "[to] follow the syntax and idiomatic conventions of English, [would be] producing what amounts to little more than English in Irish drag." With regard to the then-moribund Manx language, the scholar T. F. O'Rahilly stated, "When a language surrenders itself to foreign idiom, and when all its speakers become bilingual, the penalty is death." Neil McRae has stated that the uses of Scottish Gaelic are becoming increasingly tokenistic, and native Gaelic idiom is being lost in favor of artificial terms created by second-language speakers.

== Specific revitalization efforts ==
The total revival of a dead language (in the sense of having no native speakers) to become the shared means of communication of a self-sustaining community of several million first language speakers has happened only once, in the case of Hebrew, resulting in Modern Hebrew – now the national language of Israel. In this case, there was a unique set of historical and cultural characteristics that facilitated the revival. (See Revival of the Hebrew language.) Hebrew, once largely a liturgical language, was re-established as a means of everyday communication by Jews, some of whom had lived in what is now the State of Israel, starting in the nineteenth century. It is the world's most famous and successful example of language revitalization.

In a related development, literary languages without native speakers enjoyed great prestige and practical utility as lingua francas, often counting millions of fluent speakers at a time. In many such cases, a decline in the use of the literary language, sometimes precipitous, was later accompanied by a strong renewal. This happened, for example, in the revival of Classical Latin in the Renaissance, and the revival of Sanskrit in the early centuries AD. An analogous phenomenon in contemporary Arabic-speaking areas is the expanded use of the literary language (Modern Standard Arabic, a form of the Classical Arabic of the 6th century AD). This is taught to all educated speakers and is used in radio broadcasts, formal discussions, etc.

In addition, literary languages have sometimes risen to the level of becoming first languages of very large language communities. An example is standard Italian, which originated as a literary language based on the language of 13th-century Florence, especially as used by such important Florentine writers as Dante, Petrarch and Boccaccio. This language existed for several centuries primarily as a literary vehicle, with few native speakers; even as late as 1861, on the eve of Italian unification, the language only counted about 500,000 speakers (many non-native), out of a total population of c. 22,000,000. The subsequent success of the language has been through conscious development, where speakers of any of the numerous Italian languages were taught standard Italian as a second language and subsequently imparted it to their children, who learned it as a first language. This, however, came at the expense of local Italian languages, most of which are now endangered. Success was enjoyed in similar circumstances by High German, standard Czech, Castilian Spanish and other languages.

Language revitalization efforts are ongoing around the world. Revitalization teams are utilizing modern technologies to increase contact with indigenous languages and to record traditional knowledge.

=== Africa ===
The Coptic language began its decline when Arabic became the predominant language in Egypt. Pope Shenouda III established the Coptic Language Institute in December 1976 in Saint Mark's Coptic Orthodox Cathedral in Cairo for the purpose of reviving the Coptic language.

Ge'ez, or Classical Ethiopic, is largely used within a liturgical context by the Ethiopian Orthodox Tewahedo Church and the Eritrean Orthodox Tewahedo Church. Once the principal language of the Axumite Empire, the language was often used as a lingua franca until the 16th century where spoken languages such as Amharic began to take its place. There are modern revivalist movements to revive the use of Ge'ez as a literary and spoken language.

=== North America ===
Widespread use of Native American languages was significantly reduced by the U.S. government through mandated cultural assimilation in boarding schools where indigenous children were punished for using their native language. In recent years, a growing number of Native American tribes have been trying to revitalize their languages. For example, there are apps (including phrases, word lists and dictionaries) in many Native languages including Cree, Cherokee, Chickasaw, Lakota, Ojibwe, Oneida, Massachusett, Navajo, Halq'emeylem, Gwych'in, and Lushootseed.

In Canada, the Wapikoni Mobile project travels to indigenous communities and provides lessons in film making. Program leaders travel across Canada with mobile audiovisual production units, and aim to provide indigenous youth with a way to connect with their culture through a film topic of their choosing. The Wapikona project submits its films to events around the world as an attempt to spread knowledge of indigenous culture and language.

Wampanoag, a language spoken by the people of the same name in Massachusetts, underwent a language revival project led by Jessie Little Doe Baird, a trained linguist. Members of the tribe use the extensive written records that exist in their language, including a translation of the Bible and legal documents, in order to learn and teach Wampanoag. The project has seen children speaking the language fluently for the first time in over 100 years. In addition, there are currently attempts at reviving the Chochenyo language of California, which had become extinct.

Efforts are being made by the Confederated Tribes of the Grand Ronde Community and others to keep Chinook Jargon, also known as Chinuk Wawa, alive. This is helped by the corpus of songs and stories collected from Victoria Howard and published by Melville Jacobs.

The open-source platform FirstVoices hosts community-managed websites for 85 language revitalization projects, covering multiple varieties of 33 Indigenous languages in British Columbia as well as over a dozen languages from "elsewhere in Canada and around the globe", along with 17 dictionary apps.

==== Tlingit ====
Similar to other indigenous languages, Tlingit is critically endangered. Fewer than 100 fluent Elders existed as of 2017. From 2013 to 2014, the language activist, author, and teacher, Sʔímlaʔx^{w} Michele K. Johnson from the Syilx Nation, attempted to teach two hopeful learners of Tlingit in the Yukon. Her methods included textbook creation, sequenced immersion curriculum, and film assessment. The aim was to assist in the creation of adult speakers that are of parent-age, so that they too can begin teaching the language. In 2020, Lance X̱ʼunei Twitchell led a Tlingit online class with Outer Coast College. Dozens of students participated. He is an associate professor of Alaska Native Languages in the School of Arts and Sciences at the University of Alaska Southeast which offers a minor in Tlingit language and an emphasis on Alaska Native Languages and Studies within a Bachelorʼs degree in Liberal Arts.

==== Mixtec ====
In Mexico, the Mixtec people's language heavily revolves around the interaction between climate, nature, and what it means for their livelihood. UNESCO's LINKS (Local and Indigenous Knowledge) program recently underwent a project to create a glossary of Mixtec terms and phrases related to climate. UNESCO believes that the traditional knowledge of the Mixtec people via their deep connection with weather phenomena can provide insight on ways to address climate change. Their intention in creating the glossary is to "facilitate discussions between experts and the holders of traditional knowledge".

=== South America ===
Kichwa is the variety of the Quechua language spoken in Ecuador. Quechua is one of the most widely spoken indigenous languages in South America with approximately 7 million speakers. Despite this fact, Kichwa is a threatened language, mainly because of the expansion of Spanish in South America. One community of original Kichwa speakers, Lagunas, was one of the first indigenous communities to switch to the Spanish language. According to King, this was because of the increase of trade and business with the large Spanish-speaking town nearby. The Lagunas people assert that it was not for cultural assimilation purposes, as they value their cultural identity highly. However, once this contact was made, language for the Lagunas people shifted through generations, to Kichwa and Spanish bilingualism and now is essentially Spanish monolingualism. The feelings of the Lagunas people present a dichotomy with language use, as most of the Lagunas members speak Spanish exclusively and only know a few words in Kichwa.

The prospects for Kichwa language revitalization are not promising, as parents depend on schooling for this purpose, which is not nearly as effective as continual language exposure in the home. Schooling in the Lagunas community, although having a conscious focus on teaching Kichwa, consists of mainly passive interaction, reading, and writing in Kichwa. In addition to grassroots efforts, national language revitalization organizations, like CONAIE, focus attention on non-Spanish speaking indigenous children, who represent a large minority in the country. Another national initiative, Bilingual Intercultural Education Project (PEBI), was ineffective in language revitalization because instruction was given in Kichwa and Spanish was taught as a second language to children who were almost exclusively Spanish monolinguals. Although some techniques seem ineffective, Kendall A. King provides several suggestions:

1. Exposure to and acquisition of the language at a young age.
2. Extreme immersion techniques.
3. Multiple and diverse efforts to reach adults.
4. Flexibility and coordination in planning and implementation
5. Directly addressing different varieties of the language.
6. Planners stressing that language revitalization is a long process
7. Involving as many people as possible
8. Parents using the language with their children
9. Planners and advocates approaching the problem from all directions.

Specific suggestions include imparting an elevated perception of the language in schools, focusing on grassroots efforts both in school and the home, and maintaining national and regional attention.

==== Rapa Nui ====
Of the youth in Rapa Nui (Easter Island), ten percent learn their mother language. The rest of the community has adopted Spanish in order to communicate with the outside world and support its tourism industry. Through a collaboration between UNESCO and the Chilean Corporación Nacional de Desarrollo Indigena, the Department of Rapa Nui Language and Culture at the Lorenzo Baeza Vega School was created. Since 1990, the department has created primary education texts in the Rapa Nui language. In 2017, the Nid Rapa Nui, a non-governmental organization was also created with the goal of establishing a school that teaches courses entirely in Rapa Nui.

=== Asia ===
==== Hebrew ====
The revival of the Hebrew language is the only successful example of a revived dead language. The Hebrew language survived into the medieval period as the language of Jewish liturgy and rabbinic literature. With the rise of Zionism in the 19th century, it was revived as a spoken and literary language, becoming primarily a spoken lingua franca among the early Jewish immigrants to Ottoman Palestine and received the official status in the 1922 constitution of the British Mandate for Palestine and subsequently of the State of Israel.

==== Sanskrit ====
There have been recent attempts at reviving Sanskrit in India. However, despite these attempts, there are no first language speakers of Sanskrit in India. In each of India's recent decennial censuses, several thousand citizens (Note: 6,106 Indians in 1981, 49,736 in 1991, 14,135 in 2001, and 24,821 in 2011, have reported Sanskrit to be their mother tongue.) have reported Sanskrit to be their mother tongue. However, these reports are thought to signify a wish to be aligned with the prestige of the language, rather than being genuinely indicative of the presence of thousands of L1 Sanskrit speakers in India. There has also been a rise of so-called "Sanskrit villages", but experts have cast doubt on the extent to which Sanskrit is really spoken in such villages.

==== Soyot ====
The Soyot language of the small-numbered Soyots in Buryatia, Russia, one of the Siberian Turkic languages, has been reconstructed and a Soyot-Buryat-Russian dictionary was published in 2002. The language is currently taught in some elementary schools.

==== Ainu ====
The Ainu language of the indigenous Ainu people of northern Japan is currently moribund, but efforts are underway to revive it. A 2006 survey of the Hokkaido Ainu indicated that only 4.6% of Ainu surveyed were able to converse in or "speak a little" Ainu. As of 2001, Ainu was not taught in any elementary or secondary schools in Japan, but was offered at numerous language centres and universities in Hokkaido, as well as at Tokyo's Chiba University.

Despite this, there is an active movement to revitalize the language, mainly in Hokkaido but also elsewhere such as Kanto. Ainu oral literature has been documented both in hopes of safeguarding it for future generations, as well as using it as a teaching tool for language learners. Beginning in 1987, the Ainu Association of Hokkaido, with approximately 500 members, began hosting 14 Ainu language classes, Ainu language instructors training courses and Family Ainu Learning Initiative and have released instructional materials on the language, including a textbook. Also, Yamato linguists teach Ainu and train students to become Ainu instructors in university. In spite of these efforts, as of 2011 the Ainu language was not yet taught as a subject in any secondary school in Japan.

Due to the Ainu Cultural Promotion Act of 1997, Ainu dictionaries transformed and became tools for improving communication and preserving records of the Ainu language in order to revitalize the language and promote the culture. This act had aims to promote, disseminate, and advocate on behalf of Ainu cultural traditions. The main issue with this act however, was that not a single Ainu person was included in the "Expert" meetings prior to the law's passage, and as a result of this there was no mention of language education and how it should be carried out. The focus at this point was on Ainu culture revitalization rather than Ainu language revitalization.

As of 2011, there has been an increasing number of second-language learners, especially in Hokkaido, in large part due to the pioneering efforts of the late Ainu folklorist, activist and former Diet member Shigeru Kayano, himself a native speaker, who first opened an Ainu language school in 1987 funded by Ainu Kyokai. The Ainu Association of Hokkaido is the main supporter of Ainu culture in Hokkaido. Ainu language classes have been conducted in some areas in Japan and small numbers of young people are learning Ainu. Efforts have also been made to produce web-accessible materials for conversational Ainu because most documentation of the Ainu language focused on the recording of folktales. The Ainu language has been in media as well; the first Ainu radio program was called FM Pipaushi, which has run since 2001 along with 15-minute radio Ainu language lessons funded by FRPAC, and newspaper The Ainu Times has been established since 1997. In 2016, a radio course was broadcast by the STVradio Broadcasting to introduce Ainu language. The course put extensive efforts in promoting the language, creating 4 text books in each season throughout the year.

In addition, the Ainu language has been seen in public domains such as the outlet shopping complex's name, Rera, which means 'wind', in the Minami Chitose area and the name Pewre, meaning 'young', at a shopping centre in the Chitose area. There is also a basketball team in Sapporo founded under the name Rera Kamuy Hokkaido, after rera kamuy 'god of the wind' (its current name is Levanga Hokkaido). The well-known Japanese fashion magazine's name Non-no means 'flower' in Ainu.

Another Ainu language revitalization program is Urespa, a university program to educate high-level persons on the language of the Ainu. The effort is a collaborative and cooperative program for individuals wishing to learn about Ainu languages. This includes performances which focus on the Ainu and their language, instead of using the dominant Japanese language.

Another form of Ainu language revitalization is an annual national competition, which is Ainu language-themed. People of many differing demographics are often encouraged to take part in the contest. Since 2017, the popularity of the contest has increased.

On 15 February 2019, Japan approved a bill to recognize the Ainu language for the first time and enacted the law on 19 April 2019.

Outside of Japan, there have also been efforts to revive the Ainu culture and language in other countries, including Australia and Russia.

In 2019, researchers working together from both the Society for Academic Research of Ainu (SARC), representatives from Hokkaido University, and with the assistance of linguists spanning multiple universities and countries assisted in the creation of AI Pirika, an AI created with the goal of assisting with speech recognition and serving as a conversation partner.

On 12 July 2020, the Japanese government opened the National Ainu Museum in Shiraoi, Hokkaido. It forms one of three institutions named Upopoy (which means 'singing in a large group' in the Ainu language) alongside the National Ainu Park and a memorial site on high ground on the east side of Lake Poroto (ポロト湖) where Ainu services are held. Its director, Masahiro Nomoto, says that "One of our main objectives is to preserve and revive the language, as this is one of the most threatened elements of Ainu culture".

Announcements on some bus routes in Hokkaido can since be heard in Ainu, efforts are being undertaken to archive Ainu speech recordings by the Agency for Cultural Affairs, and there is a popular educational YouTube channel which teaches conversational Ainu.

==== Manchu ====
In China, the Manchu language is one of the most endangered languages, with speakers only in three small areas of Manchuria remaining. Some enthusiasts are trying to revive the language of their ancestors using available dictionaries and textbooks, and even occasional visits to Qapqal Xibe Autonomous County in Xinjiang, where the related Xibe language is still spoken natively.

==== Spanish ====
In the Philippines, a local variety of Spanish that was primarily based on Mexican Spanish was the lingua franca of the country since Spanish colonization in 1565 and was an official language alongside Filipino (standardized Tagalog) and English until 1987, following the ratification of a new constitution, where it was re-designated as a voluntary language.

As a result of its loss as an official language and years of marginalization at the official level during and after American colonization, the use of Spanish amongst the overall populace decreased dramatically and became moribund, with the remaining native speakers left being mostly elderly people.

The language has seen a gradual revival, however, due to official promotion under the administration of former President Gloria Macapagal Arroyo. Schools were encouraged to offer Spanish, French, and Japanese as foreign language electives. Results were immediate as the job demand for Spanish speakers had increased since 2008. As of 2010, the Instituto Cervantes in Manila reported the number of Spanish-speakers in the country with native or non-native knowledge at approximately 3 million, the figure albeit including those who speak the Spanish-based creole Chavacano. Complementing government efforts is a notable surge of exposure through the mainstream media and, more recently, music-streaming services.

==== Western Armenian ====
The Western Armenian language has been classified as a definitely endangered language in the Atlas of the World's Languages in Danger (2010), as most speakers of the dialect remain in diasporic communities away from their homeland in Anatolia, following the Armenian genocide. In spite of this, there have been various efforts to revitalize the language, especially within the Los Angeles community where the majority of Western Armenians reside.

Within her dissertation, Shushan Karapetian discusses at length the decline of the Armenian language in the United States, and new means for keeping and reviving Western Armenian, such as the creation of the Saroyan Committee or the Armenian Language Preservation Committee, launched in 2013. Other attempts at language revitalization can be seen within the University of California, Irvine. Armenian is also one of the languages Los Angeles County is required to provide voting information in. The DPSS (California Department of Social Services) also identifies Armenian as one of its "threshold languages".

==== Chong language ====
In Thailand, there exists a Chong language revitalization project, headed by Suwilai Premsrirat.

==== Zotuallai ====
In Myanmar and India, there exists a Zotuallai also known as Pau Cin Hau script revitalization project, headed by Go Suan Pau.. A key component of the initiative is the proposed inclusion of both Zotuallai and Zolai (Roman script) in Google Translate.

=== Europe ===
In Europe, in the 19th and early 20th centuries, the use of both local and learned languages declined as the central governments of the different states imposed their vernacular language as the standard throughout education and official use (this was the case in the United Kingdom, France, Spain, Italy and Greece, and to some extent, in Germany and Austria-Hungary).

In the last few decades, local nationalism and human rights movements have made a more multicultural policy standard in European states; sharp condemnation of the earlier practices of suppressing regional languages was expressed in the use of such terms as "linguicide".

==== Basque ====
In Francoist Spain, use of the Basque language was discouraged by the government's repressive policies. In the Basque Country, "Francoist repression was not only political, but also linguistic and cultural." Franco's regime suppressed Basque from official discourse, education, and publishing, making it illegal to register newborn babies under Basque names, and even requiring tombstone engravings in Basque to be removed. In some provinces the public use of Basque was suppressed, with people fined for speaking it. Public use of Basque was frowned upon by supporters of the regime, often regarded as a sign of anti-Francoism or separatism in the late 1960s.

Since 1968, Basque has been immersed in a revitalisation process, facing formidable obstacles. However, significant progress has been made in numerous areas. Six main factors have been identified to explain its relative success:

1. implementation and acceptance of Standard Basque (Euskara Batua), which was developed by the Euskaltzaindia;
2. integration of Basque into the education system;
3. creation of media in Basque (radio, newspapers, and television);
4. the established new legal framework;
5. collaboration between public institutions and people's organisations;
6. campaigns for Basque language literacy.

While those six factors influenced the revitalisation process, the extensive development and use of language technologies is also considered a significant additional factor. Overall, in the 1960s and later, the trend reversed and education and publishing in Basque began to flourish. A sociolinguistic survey shows that there has been a steady increase in Basque speakers since the 1990s, and the percentage of young speakers exceeds that of the old.

==== Irish ====
One of the best known European attempts at language revitalization concerns the Irish language. While English is dominant through most of Ireland, Irish, a Celtic language, is still spoken in certain areas called Gaeltacht, but there it is in serious decline. The challenges faced by the language over the last few centuries have included exclusion from important domains, social denigration, the death or emigration of many Irish speakers during the Irish famine of the 1840s, and continued emigration since. Efforts to revitalise Irish were being made, however, from the mid-1800s, and were associated with a desire for Irish political independence. Contemporary Irish language revitalization has chiefly involved teaching Irish as a compulsory language in mainstream English-speaking schools. But the failure to teach it in an effective and engaging way means (as linguist Andrew Carnie notes) that students do not acquire the fluency needed for the lasting viability of the language, and this leads to boredom and resentment. Carnie also noted a lack of media in Irish (2006), though this is no longer the case.

The decline of the Gaeltachtaí and the failure of state-directed revitalisation have been countered by an urban revival movement. This is largely based on an independent community-based school system, known generally as Gaelscoileanna. These schools teach entirely through Irish and their number is growing, with over thirty such schools in Dublin alone. They are an important element in the creation of a network of urban Irish speakers (known as Gaeilgeoirí), who tend to be young, well-educated and middle-class. It is now likely that this group has acquired critical mass, a fact reflected in the expansion of Irish-language media. Irish language television has enjoyed particular success. It has been argued that they tend to be better educated than monolingual English speakers and enjoy higher social status. They represent the transition of Irish to a modern urban world, with an accompanying rise in prestige.

==== Scottish Gaelic ====
There are also current attempts to revive the related language of Scottish Gaelic, which was suppressed following the formation of the United Kingdom, and entered further decline due to the Highland clearances. Currently, Gaelic is only spoken widely in the Western Isles and some relatively small areas of the Highlands and Islands. The decline in fluent Gaelic speakers has slowed; however, the population center has shifted to L2 speakers in urban areas, especially Glasgow.

==== Manx ====
Another Celtic language, Manx, lost its last native speaker in 1974 and was declared extinct by UNESCO in 2009, but never completely fell from use. The language is now taught in primary and secondary schools, including as a teaching medium at the Bunscoill Ghaelgagh, used in some public events and spoken as a second language by approximately 1,800 people. Revitalization efforts include radio shows in Manx Gaelic and social media and online resources. The Manx government has also been involved in the effort by creating organizations such as the Manx Heritage Foundation (Culture Vannin) and the position of Manx Language Officer. The government has released an official Manx Language Strategy for 2017–2021.

==== Cornish ====
There have been a number of attempts to revive the Cornish language, both privately and some under the Cornish Language Partnership. Some of the activities have included translation of the Christian scriptures, a guild of bards, and the promotion of Cornish literature in modern Cornish, including novels and poetry.

==== Caló ====
The Romani arriving in the Iberian Peninsula developed an Iberian Romani dialect. As time passed, Romani ceased to be a full language and became Caló, a cant mixing Iberian Romance grammar and Romani vocabulary. With sedentarization and obligatory instruction in the official languages, Caló is used less and less. As Iberian Romani proper is extinct and as Caló is endangered, some people are trying to revitalise the language. The Spanish politician Juan de Dios Ramírez Heredia promotes Romanò-Kalò, a variant of International Romani, enriched by Caló words. His goal is to reunify the Caló and Romani roots.

==== Livonian ====
The Livonian language, a Finnic language, once spoken on about a third of modern-day Latvian territory, died in the 21st century with the death of the last native speaker Grizelda Kristiņa on 2 June 2013. Today there are about 210 people mainly living in Latvia who identify themselves as Livonian and speak the language on the A1-A2 level according to the Common European Framework of Reference for Languages and between 20 and 40 people who speak the language on level B1 and up. Today all speakers learn Livonian as a second language. There are different programs educating Latvians on the cultural and linguistic heritage of Livonians and the fact that most Latvians have common Livonian descent.

Programs worth mentioning include:

- Livones.net with extensive information about language, history and culture;
- The Livonian Institute of the University of Latvia doing research on the Livonian language, other Finnic languages in Latvia and providing an extensive Livonian–Latvian–Estonian dictionary with declinations/conjugations;
- Virtual Livonia providing information on the Livonian language and especially its grammar;
- Mierlinkizt: An annual summer camp for children to teach children about the Livonian language, culture etc.;
- Līvõd Īt (Livonian Union).

The Livonian linguistic and cultural heritage is included in the Latvian cultural canon and the protection, revitalization and development of Livonian as an indigenous language is guaranteed by Latvian law

==== Old Prussian ====
A few linguists and philologists are involved in reviving a reconstructed form of the extinct Old Prussian language from Luther's catechisms, the Elbing Vocabulary, place names, and Prussian loanwords in the Low Prussian dialect of Low German. Several dozen people use the language in Lithuania, Kaliningrad, and Poland, including a few children who are natively bilingual.

The Prusaspirā Society has published its translation of Antoine de Saint-Exupéry's The Little Prince. The book was translated by Piotr Szatkowski (Pīteris Šātkis) and released in 2015. The other efforts of Baltic Prussian societies include the development of online dictionaries, learning apps and games. There also have been several attempts to produce music with lyrics written in the revived Baltic Prussian language, most notably in the Kaliningrad Oblast by Romowe Rikoito, Kellan and Āustras Laīwan, but also in Lithuania by Kūlgrinda in their 2005 album Prūsų Giesmės (Prussian Hymns), and in Latvia by Rasa Ensemble in 1988 and Valdis Muktupāvels in his 2005 oratorio "Pārcēlātājs Pontifex" featuring several parts sung in Prussian.

Important in this revival was Vytautas Mažiulis, who died on 11 April 2009, and his pupil Letas Palmaitis, leader of the experiment and author of the website Prussian Reconstructions. Two late contributors were Prāncis Arellis (Pranciškus Erelis), Lithuania, and Dailūns Russinis (Dailonis Rusiņš), Latvia. After them, Twankstas Glabbis from Kaliningrad oblast and Nērtiks Pamedīns from East-Prussia, now Polish Warmia-Masuria actively joined.

==== Sorbian ====
Currently, Sorbian is taught at 25 primary schools and several secondary schools. At the Lower Sorbian Gymnasium in Cottbus and the Sorbian Gymnasium in Bautzen, it is compulsory. In many primary and Sorbian schools, lessons are held in the Sorbian language. The daily newspaper Serbske Nowiny is published in Upper Sorbian, and the weekly Nowy Casnik in Lower Sorbian. In addition, the religious weekly resp. monthly journals Katolski Posoł and Pomhaj Bóh are published. The cultural magazine Rozhlad appears monthly, along with one children's magazine each in Upper and Lower Sorbian (Płomjo and Płomje, respectively), as well as the educational magazine Serbska šula.

Mitteldeutscher Rundfunk (MDR) and Rundfunk Berlin-Brandenburg (RBB) also broadcast monthly half-hour TV magazines in Sorbian, as well as several hours of daily radio programming—the Sorbian radio. Wikipedia editions exist in both written forms of the Sorbian language.

==== Wymysorys ====
Wymysorys, also known as "Vilamovian", is a critically endangered West Germanic language. It is spoken by 20 people in Wilamowice, with only one non-elderly speaker. It is currently undergoing revitalisation.

==== Yola ====
The Yola language revival movement has cultivated in Wexford in recent years, and the "Gabble Ing Yola" resource center for Yola materials claims there are around 140 speakers of the Yola language today.

=== Oceania ===
==== Australia ====
The European colonization of Australia, and the consequent damage sustained by Aboriginal communities, had a catastrophic effect on indigenous languages, especially in the southeast and south of the country, leaving some with no living traditional native speakers. A number of Aboriginal communities in Victoria and elsewhere are now trying to revive some of the Aboriginal Australian languages. The work is typically directed by a group of Aboriginal elders and other knowledgeable people, with community language workers doing most of the research and teaching. They analyze the data, develop spelling systems and vocabulary and prepare resources. Decisions are made in collaboration. Some communities employ linguists, and there are also linguists who have worked independently, such as Luise Hercus and Peter K. Austin.

- In the state of Queensland, an effort is being made to teach some Indigenous languages in schools and to develop workshops for adults. More than 150 languages were once spoken within the state, but today fewer than 20 are spoken as a first language, and less than two per cent of schools teach any Indigenous language. The Gunggari language is one language which is being revived, with only three native speakers left.
- In the Northern Territory, the Pertame Project is an example in Central Australia. Pertame, from the country south of Alice Springs, along the Finke River, is a dialect in the Arrernte group of languages. With only 20 fluent speakers left by 2018, the Pertame Project is seeking to retain and revive the language, headed by Pertame elder Christobel Swan.
- In the far north of South Australia, the Diyari language has an active programme under way, with materials available for teaching in schools and the wider community. Also in South Australia, there is a unit at the University of Adelaide which teaches and promotes the use of the Kaurna language, headed by Rob Amery, who has produced many books and course materials.
- The Victorian Department of Education and Training reported 1,867 student enrollments in 14 schools offering an Aboriginal Languages Program in the state of Victoria in 2018.

==== New Zealand ====
One of the best cases of relative success in language revitalization is the case of Maori, also known as te reo Māori. It is the ancestral tongue of the indigenous Maori people of New Zealand and a vehicle for prose narrative, sung poetry, and genealogical recital. The history of the Maori people is taught in Maori in sacred learning houses through oral transmission. Even after Maori became a written language, the oral tradition was preserved.

Once European colonization began, many laws were enacted in order to promote the use of English over Maori among indigenous people. The Education Ordinance Act of 1847 mandated school instruction in English and established boarding schools to speed up assimilation of Maori youths into European culture. The Native School Act of 1858 forbade Māori from being spoken in schools.

During the 1970s, a group of young Maori people, the Ngā Tamatoa, successfully campaigned for Maori to be taught in schools. Also, Kōhanga Reo, Māori language preschools, called language nests, were established. The emphasis was on teaching children the language at a young age, a very effective strategy for language learning. The Maori Language Commission was formed in 1987, leading to a number of national reforms aimed at revitalizing Maori. They include media programmes broadcast in Maori, undergraduate college programmes taught in Maori, and an annual Maori language week. Each iwi (tribe) created a language planning programme catering to its specific circumstances. These efforts have resulted in a steady increase in children being taught in Maori in schools since 1996.

==== Hawaiian ====
On six of the seven inhabited islands of Hawaii, Hawaiian was displaced by English and is no longer used as the daily language of communication. The one exception is Niʻihau, where Hawaiian has never been displaced, has never been endangered, and is still used almost exclusively. Efforts to revive the language have increased in recent decades. Hawaiian language immersion schools are now open to children whose families want to retain (or introduce) Hawaiian language into the next generation. The local National Public Radio station features a short segment titled "Hawaiian word of the day". Additionally, the Sunday editions of the Honolulu Star-Bulletin and its successor, the Honolulu Star-Advertiser, feature a brief article called Kauakūkalahale, written entirely in Hawaiian by a student.

== Health benefits of language revitalization ==
Language revitalisation has been linked to increased health outcomes for Indigenous Australian communities involved in reclaiming traditional language. Benefits range from improved mental health for community members, increasing connectedness to culture, identity, and a sense of wholeness. Indigenous languages are a core element in the formation of identity, providing pathways for cultural expression, agency, spiritual and ancestral connection. Connection to culture is considered to play an important role in childhood development, and is a UN convention right.

Colonisation and subsequent linguicide carried out through policies such as those that created Australia's Stolen Generations have damaged this connection. It has been proposed that language revitalization may play an important role in countering intergenerational trauma that has been caused. Researchers at the University of Adelaide and South Australian Health and Medical Research Institute have found that language revitalisation of Aboriginal languages is linked to better mental health. One study in the Barngarla Community in South Australia has been looking holistically at the positive benefits of language reclamation, healing mental and emotional scars, and building connections to community and country that underpin wellness and wholeness. The study identified the Barngarla peoples' connection to their language as a strong component of developing a strong cultural and personal identity; the people are as connected to language as they are to culture, and culture is key to their identity. Some proponents claim that language reclamation is a form of empowerment and builds strong connections with community and wholeness.

== Criticism ==
The protection of minority languages from extinction is often not a concern for speakers of the dominant language. There is often prejudice and deliberate persecution of minority languages, in order to appropriate the cultural and economic capital of minority groups. At other times governments deem that the cost of revitalization programs and creating linguistically diverse materials is too great to take on.

John McWhorter, American linguist and professor at Columbia University, has argued that programs to revive indigenous languages will almost never be very effective because of the practical difficulties involved. He also argues that the death of a language does not necessarily mean the death of a culture. He argues that language death is, ironically, a sign of hitherto isolated peoples migrating and sharing space. In a 2009 article titled The Cosmopolitan Tongue: The Universality of English, McWhorter argues, "to maintain distinct languages across generations happens only amidst unusually tenacious self-isolation—such as that of the Amish—or brutal segregation".

At the end of the day, language death is, ironically, a symptom of people coming together. Globalization means hitherto isolated peoples migrating and sharing space. For them to do so and still maintain distinct languages across generations happens only amidst unusually tenacious self-isolation?such as that of the Amish? or brutal segregation. (Jews did not speak Yiddish in order to revel in their diversity but because they lived in an apartheid society.) Crucially, it is black Americans, the Americans whose English is most distinct from that of the mainstream, who are the ones most likely to live separately from whites geographically and spiritually.

The alternative, it would seem, is indigenous groups left to live in isolation? complete with the maltreatment of women and lack of access to modern medicine and technology typical of such societies. Few could countenance this as morally justified, and attempts to find some happy medium in such cases are frustrated by the simple fact that such peoples, upon exposure to the West, tend to seek membership in it.

As we assess our linguistic future as a species, a basic question remains. Would it be inherently evil if there were not 6,000 spoken languages but one?

We must consider the question in its pure, logical essence, apart from particular associations with English and its history. Notice, for example, how the discomfort with the prospect in itself eases when you imagine the world's language being, say, Eyak.

— John McWhorter, The Cosmopolitan Tongue: The Universality of English, World Affairs, vol. 172, no. 2, pp. 67–68.

Kenan Malik, Neurobiologist and author, has also argued that it is "irrational" to try to preserve all the world's languages, as language death is natural and in many cases inevitable, even with intervention. He proposes that language death improves communication by ensuring more people speak the same language. This may benefit the economy and reduce conflict.

"To have a public policy that a certain culture or language should be preserved shows a fundamental misunderstanding. I don't see why it's in the public good to preserve Manx or Cornish or any other language for that matter. ... If a language is one that people don't participate in, it's not a language anymore."

— Kenan Malik, Are dying languages worth saving?, BBC News

== See also ==
- Category:Language activists
- Contemporary Latin
- Directorate of Language Planning and Implementation
- Endangered languages
- Language documentation
- Language nest
- Language planning
- Language policy
- Official language
- English-only movement
- Linguistic purism
- Minority language
- Regional language
- Rosetta Project
- Sacred language
- Second-language acquisition
- Treasure language
- Languages in censuses

=== Digital projects and repositories ===
- Lingua Libre − a libre online tool used to record words and phrases of any language (thousands of recordings have already been done in endangered languages like Atikamekw, Occitan, Basque, Catalan, and are all available on Wikimedia Commons)
- Tatoeba contains example sentences with translations in dozens of endangered languages, including Belarusian, Breton, Basque and Cornish.
- The Living Archive of Aboriginal Languages − contains works in endangered languages of the Northern Territory, Australia
- FirstVoices - contains community-managed dictionaries, songs, stories, and multimedia for Indigenous languages in British Columbia

=== Organizations ===
- Foundation for Endangered Languages
- The Language Conservancy
- Pūnana Leo, Hawaiian language schools
- Resource Network for Linguistic Diversity
- Culture Vannin, Manx Gaelic language organization
- SIL International
- First Peoples' Cultural Council, Indigenous language, arts, and heritage revitalization in British Columbia

=== Lists ===
- Lists of endangered languages
- List of endangered languages with mobile apps
- Lists of extinct languages
- List of language regulators
- List of revived languages

== Bibliography ==
- Bugaeva, Anna (2010). "Internet applications for endangered languages: A talking dictionary of Ainu" (PDF). Waseda Institute for Advanced Study Research Bulletin. 3: 73–81. Archived from the original (PDF) on 12 May 2021.
- Gayman, Jeffry (2011). "Ainu right to education and Ainu practice of 'education': current situation and imminent issues in light of Indigenous education rights and theory". Intercultural Education. 22 (1): 15–27. doi:10.1080/14675986.2011.549642. S2CID 144373133.
- Hansen, A. S. (2014). "Re-vitalizing an Indigenous Language: Dictionaries of Ainu Languages in Japan, 1625–2013". Lexicographica. 30 (1): 547–578. doi:10.1515/lexi-2014-0017. S2CID 156901164.
- Martin, Kylie (2011). "Aynu itak: On the Road to Ainu Language Revitalization" (PDF). Media and Communication Studies メディア·コミュニケーション研究. 60: 57–93. hdl:2115/47031. Archived (PDF) from the original on 21 April 2015.
- Miyaoka, Osahito; Sakiyama, Osamu; Krauss, Michael E., eds. (2007). The Vanishing Languages of the Pacific Rim. Oxford: Oxford University Press. pp. 377–382. doi:10.1093/oso/9780199266623.001.0001. ISBN 978-0-19-153289-4.
- Teeter, Jennifer; Okazaki, Takayuki (2011). "Ainu as a Heritage Language of Japan: History, Current State and Future of Ainu Language Policy and Education". Heritage Language Journal. 8 (2): 251–269. doi:10.46538/hlj.8.2.5.
- Tsunoda, Tasaku (2005). Language Endangerment and Language Revitalization. Berlin: Mouton De Gruyter. doi:10.26530/oapen_626366. hdl:20.500.12657/31654. ISBN 978-3-11-089658-9.
- Uzawa, Kanako (2019). "What Does Ainu Cultural Revitalisation Mean to Ainu and Wajin Youth in the 21st century? Case Study of Urespa as a Place to Learn Ainu Culture in the City of Sapporo, Japan". AlterNative. 15 (2): 168–179. doi:10.1177/1177180119846665. S2CID 197693428.
