= Akiho =

Akiho is a Japanese given name and surname. According to WWWJDIC, there are more than a hundred different ways this name might be written in kanji.

== Surname ==
- Andy Akiho (born 1971), American percussionist and composer

== Given name ==
- Akiho Miyashiro (都城 秋穂, 1920–2008), Japanese male geologist
- Akiho Yoshizawa (吉沢 明歩, born 1984), Japanese female adult video actress
- Akiho Suzumoto (涼本 あきほ, fl. 2018–present), Japanese female voice actress

Fictional characters:

- Akiho Ishiyama, supporting character in Code Lyoko
- Akiho Hayama (葉山 秋穂), the heroine of Rakka Ryūsui
- Akiho Nagomi (和実 あきほ), in Delicious Party Pretty Cure
- Akiho Senomiya (瀬乃宮 あき穂), in Robotics;Notes
