= CEDICT =

Chinese–English dictionary

The CEDICT project was started by Paul Denisowski in 1997 and is maintained by a team on mdbg.net under the name CC-CEDICT, with the aim to provide a complete Chinese to English dictionary with pronunciation in pinyin for the Chinese characters.

== Content ==
CEDICT is a text file; other programs (or simply Notepad or egrep or equivalent) are needed to search and display it. This project is used by several other Chinese-English projects. The Unihan Database uses CEDICT data for most of its information about character compounds, but this is auxiliary and is explicitly not a part of the main Unicode database.

Features:

- Traditional Chinese and Simplified Chinese
- Pinyin (several pronunciations)
- American English (several)
- As of 16 July 2025, it had 123,524 entries in UTF-8.

The basic format of a CEDICT entry is:

Traditional Simplified [pin1 yin1] /American English equivalent 1/equivalent 2/
漢字 汉字 [han4 zi4] /Chinese character/CL:個|个/

Example of a simple egrep search:

$ egrep -i 有勇無謀 cedict.txt
有勇無謀 有勇无谋 [you3 yong3 wu2 mou2] /bold but not very astute/

== History ==
Year	Event
1991	EDICT Japanese dictionary project was started by Jim Breen.
1997	CEDICT project started by Paul Denisowski, on the model of EDICT. Continued by Erik Peterson.
2007	MDBG started a new project called CC-CEDICT which continues the CEDICT project with a new license: Creative Commons Attribution-Share Alike 3.0 License, allowing more projects to use it. Additionally a work flow has been set up to streamline the process of submitting, reviewing and processing new entries.

== Related projects ==
CEDICT has shown the way to some other projects:

- HanDeDict (~149,000 Chinese entries) for German
- CFDICT (~60,000 entries) for French
- Some older CEDICT data is also found in the Adsotrans dictionary.
- February 2012: ChE-DICC, the Spanish-Chinese free dictionary starts (currently beta)
- CHDICT (~19,000 entries) for Hungarian
- CC-Canto is Pleco Software's addition of Cantonese language readings in Jyutping transcription to CC-CEDICT
- Cantonese CEDICT features Cantonese language readings in Yale transcription and has Cantonese-specific words, many of which were taken from "A Dictionary of Cantonese Slang" in possible copyright infringement.
- CC-CIDICT (over 124,000 entries) is a free, open-source Chinese–Indonesian dictionary. It is a direct derivative of the CC-CEDICT project. The project is community-managed and released under a Creative Commons Attribution–ShareAlike 4.0 International (CC BY-SA 4.0) license.
