= Degree of endangerment =

Conservation status of a language

The picture shows the dialects of the Romani, which are under threat of disappearance.

Degree of endangerment is an evaluation assigned by UNESCO to the languages in the Atlas of the World's Languages in Danger. Evaluation is given according to nine criteria, the most important of which is the criterion of language transmission between generations.

== Degree of endangerment ==
Status	Explanation	Examples
Safe	The language is used by all generations. The transmission of the language from generation to generation is not disturbed	English, Arabic, Spanish, German, Russian, Ukrainian, French
Vulnerable	The language is used by most children, but it is used with some restrictions. For example, they speak this language only at home.	Adyghe, Anal, Bashkir, Belarusian, Chuvash, Neapolitan, Yiddish
Definitely endangered	The language is not learned by children as a native	Erzya, Mari, Newar, Romani, Udmurt, Walloon
Severely endangered	The language is used by older generations and is understandable to parents, but they do not use it when communicating with children and among themselves	Breton, Ingrian, Judaeo-Spanish, Nafusi, Nanai
Language revitalization	The language is in the process of being restored	Cornish, Manchu, Manx
Critically endangered languages	Only old people know the language and it is rarely used by them	Dahalik, Duruwa, Orok, Tofa, Ulch
Extinct language	1. There are no living native speakers in the world 2. Previously, the language definitely existed, but now there is no reliable information about its state	1. Dalmatian, Obispeño, Gothic; 2. Ancient Cappadocian, Livonian, Yukaghir
