= Forvo =

Pronunciation website

- Website type: Linguistics
- Owner: Forvo Media SL
- Website: forvo.com
- Commercial: Yes
- Registration: Optional, but required to download MP3s and to add pronunciations
- Launched: January 2008
- Content license: Creative Commons Attribution-NonCommercial-ShareAlike 3.0
- License was Creative Commons from January 2008 until August 2019. See note below.

Forvo.com (/ˈfɔːrvoʊ/ FOR-voh) is a website that allows access to, and playback of, pronunciation sound clips in many different languages to facilitate language learning. Forvo.com was first envisioned in 2007 by co-founder Israel Rondón, and came to fruition in 2008. Forvo.com is owned by Forvo Media SL, based in San Sebastián, Spain. It claims on its "about" page to be the largest pronunciation guide website on the Internet. It has been listed among the 50 best websites of 2013 by Time.

All sound clips on Forvo.com are user-generated, which are voted on by other users, positively or negatively, in an effort to ensure that the highest quality sound clips have priority in the site's listings. The pronunciations are also reviewed and edited by a volunteer team of editors.

Forvo has an API that allows other websites to draw from its pronunciation repository which requires a fee ($2/year for non-commercial use).

== Recommendations for adding words ==
Forvo just encourages adding simple words but there are some exceptions that can be clearly found in their recommendations and policy.

== Forvo License and User's Rights ==
For a long time since the beginning of Forvo in 2008 it operated under Creative Commons BY-NC-SA 3.0. By the end of 2019 Forvo had removed the "Creative Commons" terms and conditions from their website, replacing them with an "ad hoc" license that severely restricts user's rights to copy, modify and redistribute the audio files.

From 2008 until 2019 at Forvo's request volunteers recorded their voices and approximately 5 million audios were recorded under Creative Commons BY-NC-SA 3.0. Afterwards, Forvo suddenly changed its license to make all recordings their exclusive property. Many users have complained about the new restrictions on audio downloading. Forvo tried to revoke the rights of users and impede them from downloading their own voices.

More than 5 million audios were recorded under a Creative Commons license that grants irrevocable rights to users to obtain a copy, modify and redistribute the data. However, Forvo violated the Creative Commons license by restricting the freedom of its users. In contrast, the free and open source alternative Lingua Libre allows users to copy, modify and share their audios.

== See also ==
- Lingua Libre
- Common Voice
