= WWWJDIC =

WWWJDIC is an online Japanese dictionary based on the electronic dictionaries compiled and collected by Australian academic Jim Breen. The main Japanese–English dictionary file (EDICT) contains over 180,000 entries, and the ENAMDICT dictionary contains over 720,000 Japanese surnames, first names, place names and product names. WWWJDIC also contains several specialized dictionaries covering topics such as life sciences, law, computing, engineering, etc.

For example sentences with Japanese words, WWWJDIC makes use of a sentence database from the Tatoeba project, largely based on the Tanaka Corpus. Unlike the original Tanaka Corpus, the sentences from the Tatoeba project are not public domain, but are available under the non-restrictive CC-BY license. The sentence collection contains over 150,000 sentence pairs in Japanese and English.

In addition to Japanese–English, the dictionary has Japanese paired with German, French, Russian, Hungarian, Swedish, Spanish and Dutch. However, currently there are no example sentences for these languages.

The dictionary is updated freely and may be copied under its own licence arrangements.

Several mirror sites of the main WWWJDIC also exist around the world. These sites update daily from the home site at the Electronic Dictionary Research and Development Group (EDRDG).

== See also ==
- Japanese language education
