= Lower Sorbian Gymnasium Cottbus =

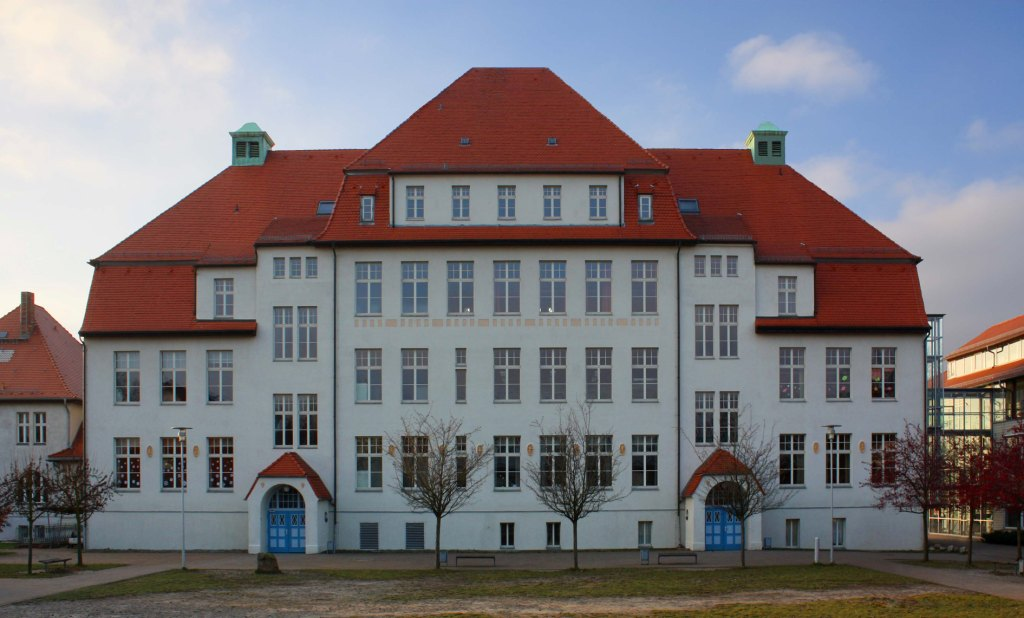

Location
- Cottbus, Brandenburg; Germany; 51°46′10″N 14°19′52″E

Information
- Type: Public
- Established: 1952
- Founder: Council of Ministers of East Germany
- Principal: Anke Hille-Sickert
- Gender: Co-ed
- Language: Lower Sorbian, German
- Campus: Urban
- Accreditation: Federal Ministry of Education and Research, Ministry for Education, Youth and Sport of Brandenburg
- Website: www.nsg-cottbus.de

Lower Sorbian Gymnasium Cottbus (Lower Sorbian: Dolnoserbski gymnazium Chóśebuz, German: Niedersorbisches Gymnasium Cottbus), is a coeducational gymnasium (e.g. preparatory high school or grammar school) in Cottbus the second-largest city in Brandenburg, Germany. It is the only high school in Lower Lusatia in which education is organized in Lower Sorbian language and the language is compulsory up to the twelfth grade. While German language is widely used as the first language by many students and professors, in May 2005 and following the 2004 enlargement of the European Union some students recognized education in the school as a good preparation for future participation in economic exchanges with neighboring West Slavic countries of Czech Republic and Poland.

== See also ==
- Secondary education
- Brandenburg University of Technology
- (Upper) Sorbian Gymnasium Bautzen
