= Sorbian Gymnasium Bautzen =

Serbski gymnazij Budyšin Sorbian Gymnasium in Bautzen
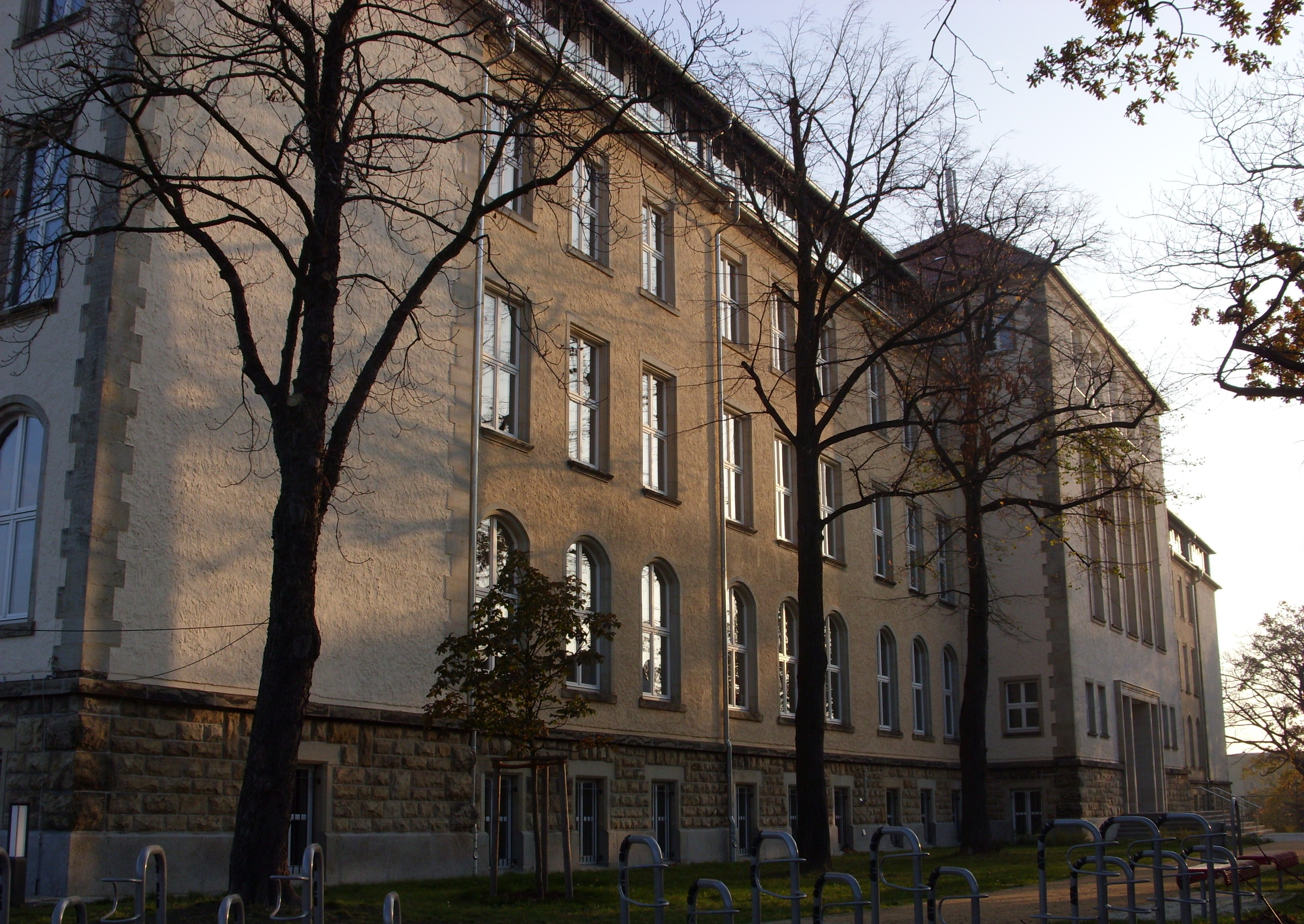

Location
- Bautzen; Germany
- Coordinates: 51.1861°N 14.4355°E

Information
- Type: Public
- Established: 1947
- Founder: Council of Ministers of East Germany
- Gender: Co-ed
- Language: Upper Sorbian, German
- Campus: Urban
- Accreditation: Federal Ministry of Education and Research
- Website: serbski-gymnazij.de/..

The Sorbian Gymnasium in Bautzen (Upper Sorbian: Serbski gymnazij Budyšin, German: Sorbisches Gymnasium Bautzen) is a coeducational gymnasium (e.g. preparatory high school or grammar school) in Saxony, Germany, which teaches in Upper Sorbian and German. The school is acting under the slogan "Develop Sorbian identity and cultivate humanistic traditions".

== Notable alumni ==
- Stanislaw Tillich
- Bogna Koreng
- Klaus Thielmann

== See also ==
- Secondary education
- Lower Sorbian Gymnasium Cottbus
