= Jim Breen =

Australian linguist

James William Breen BSc (Melb), MBA (Melb), PhD (Melb), AMusA (AMEB), RSA
- Born: 1947 (age 78–79)
- Other name: Jim Breen
- Occupations: Head of the Department of Digital Systems, Monash University
- Known for: WWWJDIC, JMdict, EDICT, KANJIDIC
- Title: Professor (retired)
- Board member of: Japanese Studies Centre, Monash University
- Spouse: Julia Breen
- Children: 3

Academic background
- Education: University of Melbourne, Australian Music Examinations Board
- Alma mater: University of Melbourne
- Thesis: Extraction of neologisms from Japanese corpora (2017)
- Doctoral advisor: Timothy Baldwin

Academic work
- Discipline: Computational Linguistics, Computer Science
- Sub-discipline: Digital and Data Communications, Lexicography
- Institutions: Monash University, Chisholm Institute of Technology
- Website: www.edrdg.org/~jwb/

James William Breen (born 1947) is an Australian retired academic, computational linguist and lexicographer. He is best known for creating and maintaining several foundational free resources for Japanese language learning and computational linguistics, including the EDICT/JMDict Japanese–English dictionaries, the KANJIDIC kanji dictionary, and the WWWJDIC online search portal. These resources are considered "reliable and close to comprehensive" and form the backbone of many popular Japanese dictionary applications and websites.

== Career ==
=== Industry and Academia ===
After completing a BSc in mathematics at the University of Melbourne, Breen began his career in 1968 as a trainee programmer for the Australian Postmaster-General's Department. He subsequently worked for the Defence Department, Telecom Australia (now Telstra) and a private consultancy, specialising in systems programming, computer networking, and communications. During this time, he also earned an MBA from the University of Melbourne.

In 1985, Breen moved into academia, assuming position as Principal Lecturer at the Chisholm Institute of Technology. He immediately became Head of the Department of Robotics & Digital Technology (later the Department of Digital Systems). In 1990, Chisholm merged with Monash University, where Breen's position was converted to Associate Professor and later to a fixed-term full Professor while he headed the department. He served as Head of Department for 11 years 6 months, until 1997.

Breen took early retirement from his tenured position in August 2003, but remained affiliated with Monash as an Honorary (later Adjunct) Senior Research Fellow. Until mid-2025, he held this position in the Japanese Studies Centre, where he also served on the board. (See a list of his publications).

=== Contributions to Japanese Lexicography ===
Following his retirement, Breen's research interests shifted decisively to computational linguistics. His major project has, for a very long time, been the development and curation of free, open-source Japanese lexical resources. These resources are widely used worldwide, including in the creation of popular language learning tools such as Jisho.org, Rikai, and mobile apps like ImiWa and AEDict.

- EDICT/JMDict: EDICT started off as a personal project but later evolved into the collaborative JMDict project, a large, structured Japanese-English dictionary file. As of 2018, it contained over 180,000 terms and has grown further, forming the core data for countless applications. As of 2025, Breen is still constantly engaged in updating and adding entries into the file.
- KANJIDIC: A machine-readable dictionary file containing detailed information on thousands of kanji, including readings, meanings, and reference codes.
- WWWJDIC: A long-running web portal and server that provides a free interface to search the EDICT/JMDict and KANJIDIC files.

From December 2000 to June 2001, Breen was a Visiting Professor at the Research Institute for the Languages and Cultures of Asia and Africa (ILCAA) at the Tokyo University of Foreign Studies in Japan.

In 2009, he commenced a part-time PhD in computational linguistics at the University of Melbourne, supervised by Timothy Baldwin. His thesis, "Extraction of neologisms from Japanese corpora," was submitted in 2017.

== Personal life ==
Breen currently lives in Camberwell, Victoria with his wife, Julia, a Suzuki method music teacher. They have three adult children and grandchildren. An active rower, he is a member and former treasurer of the Hawthorn Rowing Club. He and his wife also maintain a weekend home in Jamieson, Victoria. Breen has been a dedicated user of the Linux operating system since 1994 and is an occasional music reviewer for the Classic Melbourne website.
