= Kombumori Station =

Railway station in Nemuro, Hokkaido, Japan

Coordinates: 43.2286°N 145.5422°E

Kombumori Station 昆布盛駅
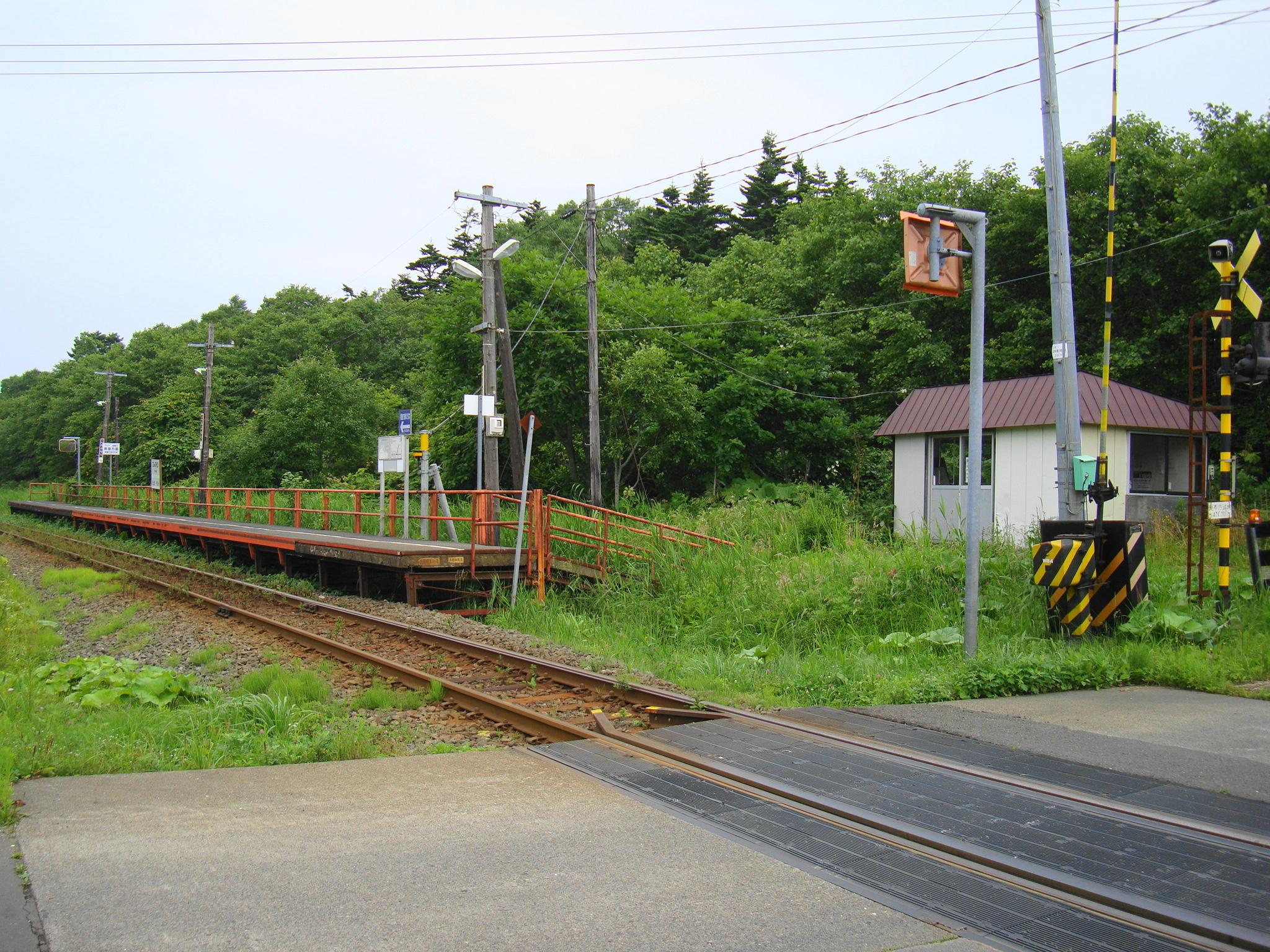
- Kombumori Station (August 2010)

General information
- Location: Nemuro, Hokkaido; Japan
- Operator: Hokkaido Railway Company
- Line: ■ Nemuro Main Line
- Platforms: 1 Side platform
- Tracks: 1

Construction
- Structure type: At-grade
- Accessible: No
Location
- Location within Japan

Kombumori Station (昆布盛駅, Konbumori-eki) is a railway station on the Nemuro Main Line of JR Hokkaido located in Nemuro, Hokkaidō, Japan. The station opened on October 1, 1961.

== Layout ==
Kombumori Station has a single side platform.

=== Platforms ===
1	■Nemuro Main Line	For Kushiro and Nemuro

== History ==
=== Future plans ===
In June 2023, this station was selected to be among 42 stations on the JR Hokkaido network to be slated for abolition owing to low ridership.

== Adjacent stations ==
«	Service	»
Nemuro Main Line
Rapid: Does not stop at this station
Ochiishi	Local	Nishi-Wada
