= Kanayama =

Kanayama (金山; "gold mountain") is a Japanese surname. Notable people with the surname include:

- Heizo Kanayama (金山 平三; 1883–1964), Japanese painter
- Hidenari Kanayama (金山 英勢; born 1990), Japanese luger
- Junki Kanayama (金山 隼樹; born 1988), Japanese football goalkeeper
- Kazuo Kanayama (金山 和雄; born 1952), Japanese golfer
- Masahide Kanayama (金山 政英; 1909–1997), Japanese diplomat

== See also ==
- Kanayama Castle, a castle in Gunma Prefecture, Japan
- Kanayama Station (disambiguation), multiple train stations in Japan
- Kanayama Dam (disambiguation), multiple dams in Japan
- Kaneyama (disambiguation), another toponym written with the same characters
