= Higashi-Nemuro Station =

Railway station in Nemuro, Hokkaido, Japan

Higashi-Nemuro Station 東根室駅
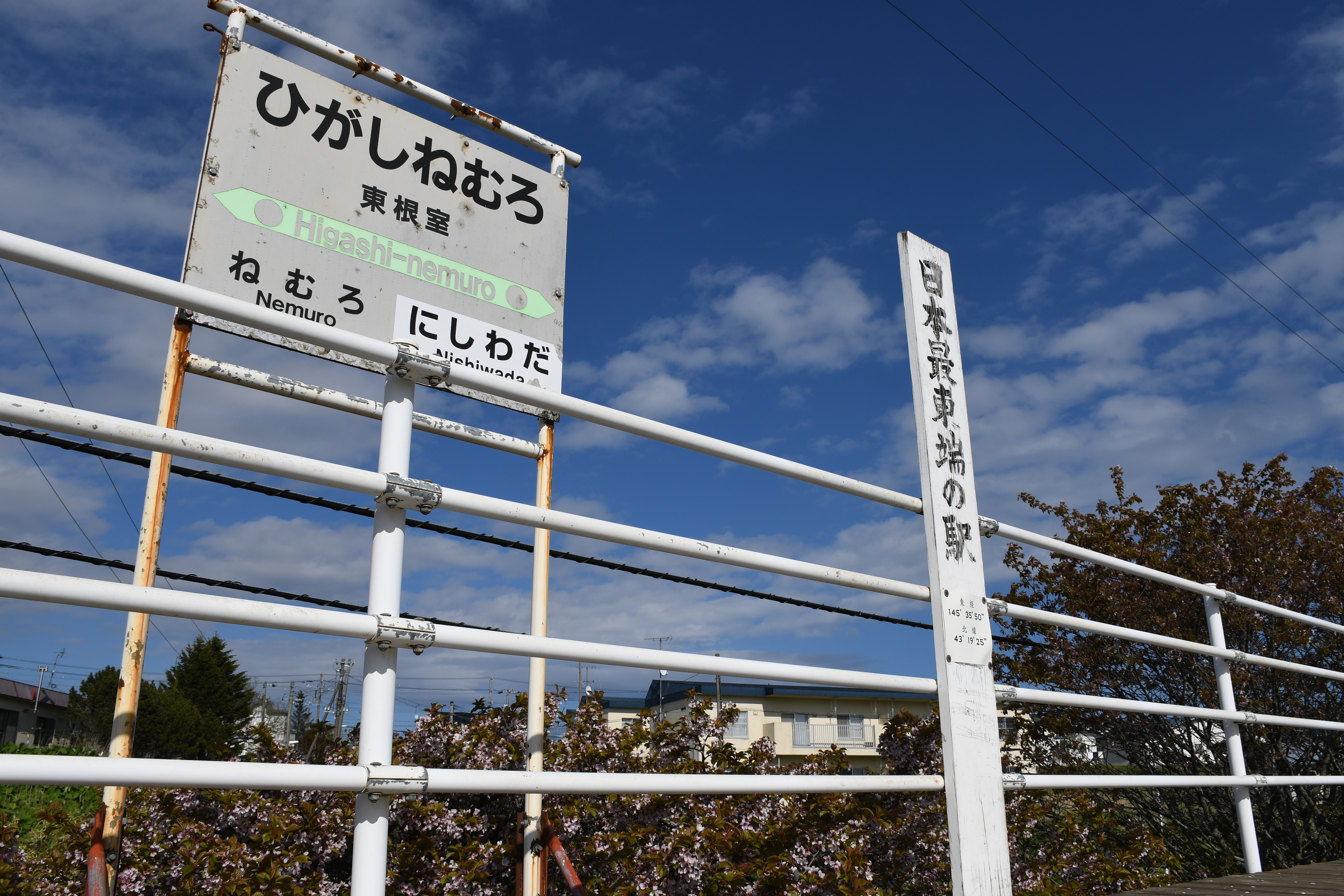

General information
- Location: 2-15 Koyocho, Nemuro City, Nemuro Subprefecture; Hokkaido Prefecture; Japan
- Coordinates: 43°19′16″N 145°36′05″E
- Operator: JR Hokkaido
- Line: Nemuro Main Line
- Distance: 442.3 km (274.8 mi) from Takikawa
- Platforms: 1 side platform
- Tracks: 1

Construction
- Structure type: At grade

History
- Opened: September 1, 1961
- Closed: March 14, 2025

Services
Preceding station	JR Hokkaido	Following station
Nishi-Wada towards Takikawa	Nemuro Main Line	Nemuro Terminus
Location
- Location within Hokkaido Location within Japan

Higashi-Nemuro Station (東根室駅, Higashi-Nemuro-eki) was a railway station on the Nemuro Main Line of JR Hokkaido located in Nemuro, Hokkaido, Japan. The station opened on September 1, 1961, and closed on March 14, 2025. It was the easternmost railway station in Japan.

== Station layout ==
The unmanned station had a single wooden platform serving a single track. The easternmost station status was indicated by a monument beside the platform.

== History ==
The station began operations unofficially on February 1 1961, with the station officially opening on September 1 1961.

The station was proposed to be closed on August 23, 2024. On March 14, 2025, the station was abolished due to low number of passengers.

== Gallery ==
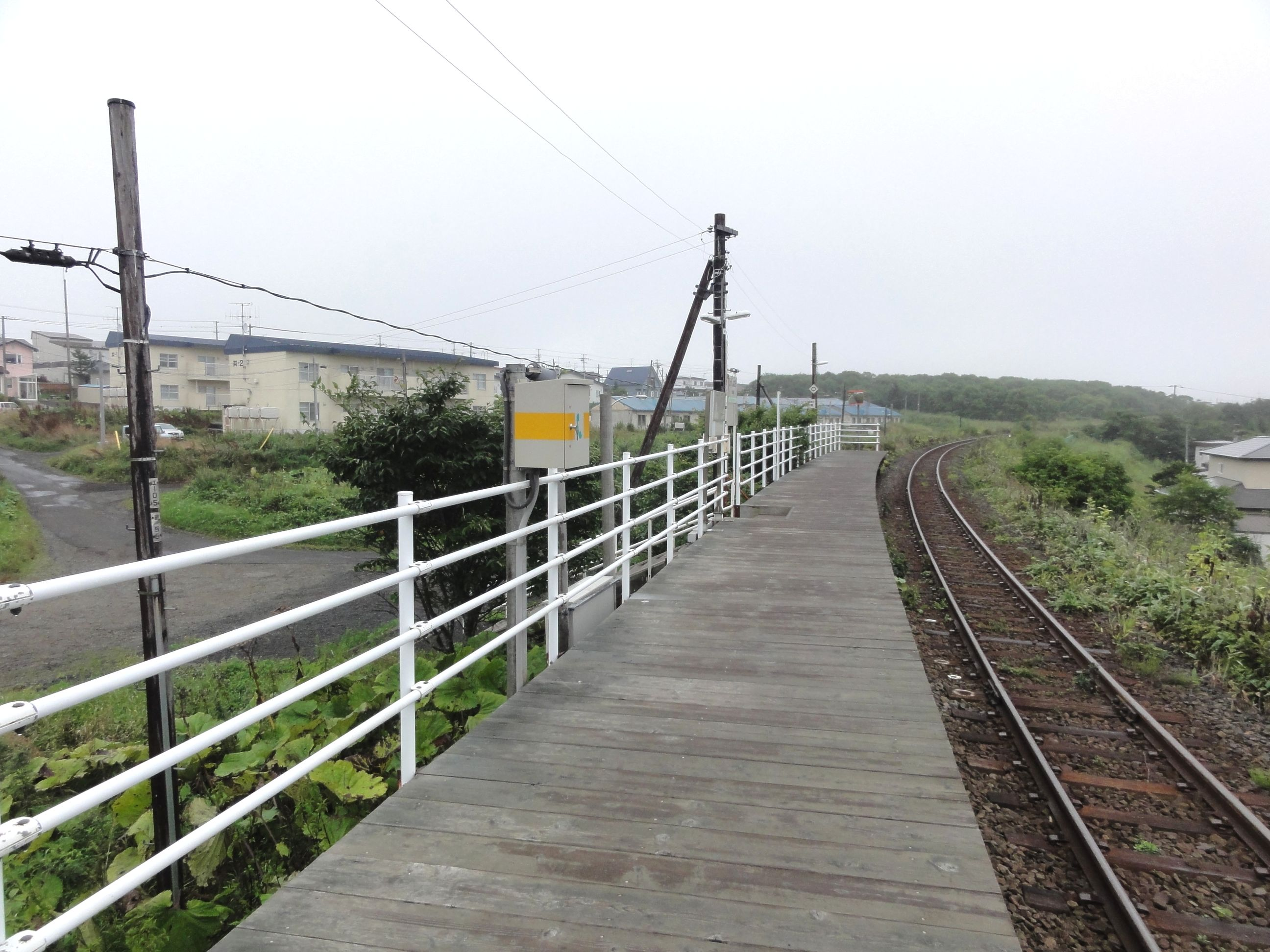
Station platform, August 2011

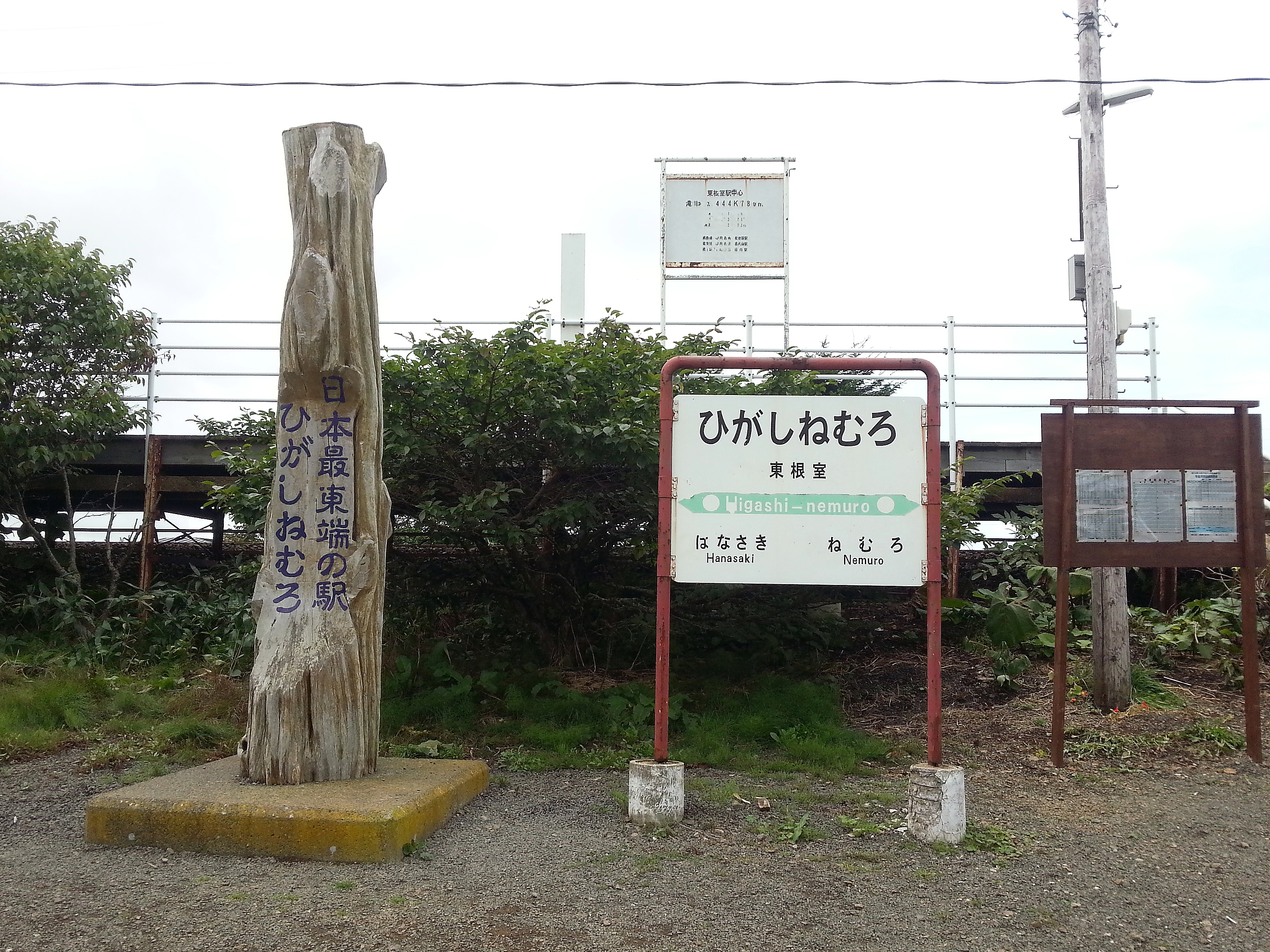
Eastern most station monument, September 2013
