= K46 =

K46 may refer to:

- K-46 (Kansas highway)
- K-46 (1927), now part of U.S. Route 160
- Blair Municipal Airport, in Washington County, Nebraska
- BMW K46, a German sport bike
- Furuse Station, in Hokkaido, Japan
- HMS La Malouine (K46), a Flower-class corvette of the Royal Navy
- INS Vipul (K46), a Veer-class corvette of the Indian Navy
- Potassium-46, an isotope of potassium
