= Nemuro Main Line =

Railway line in Hokkaido, Japan

Nemuro Line
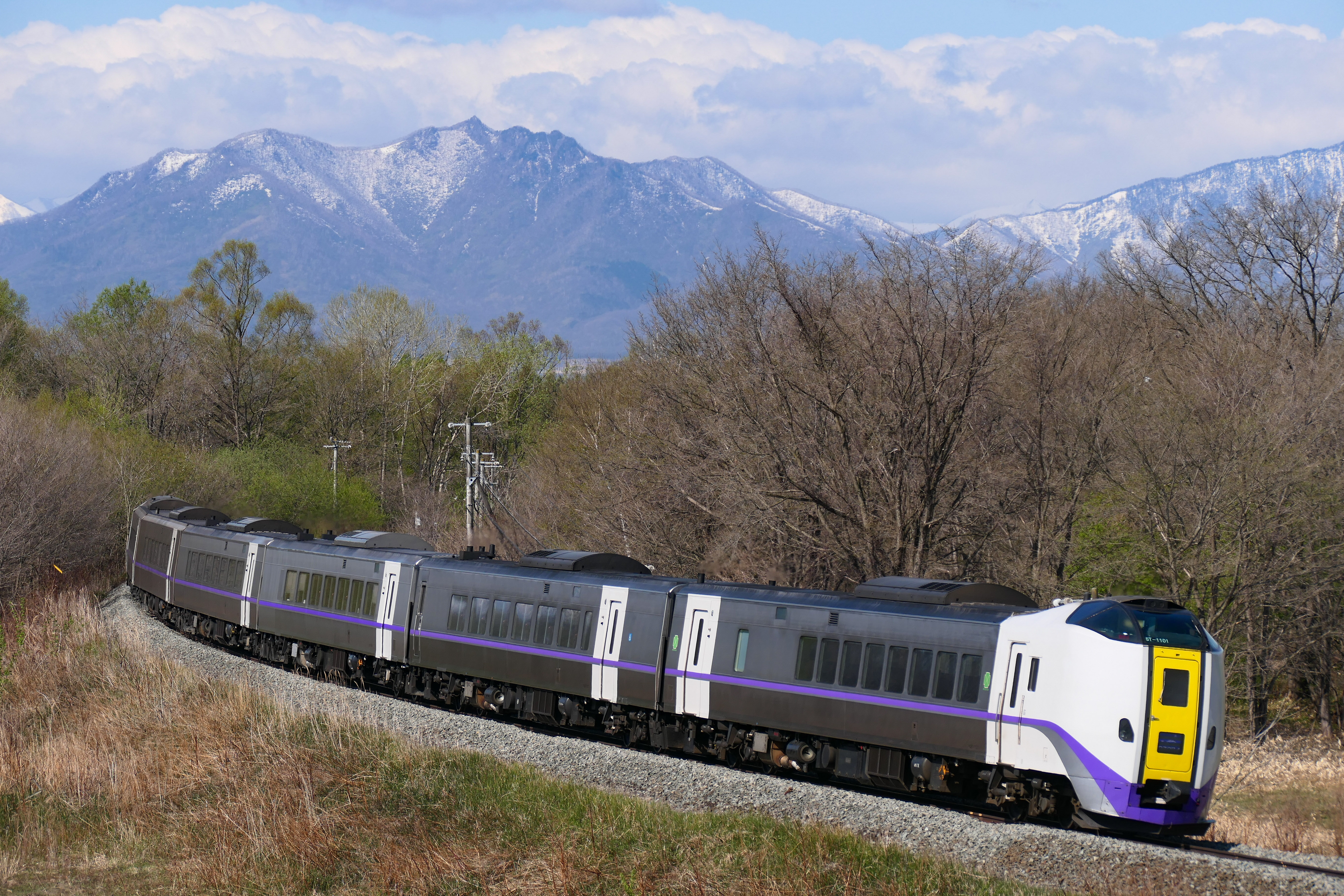
- A KiHa 261-1000 series DMU between Taisei and Memuro

Overview
- Native name: 根室本線
- Status: In operation
- Owner: JR Hokkaido
- Locale: Hokkaido
- Termini: Takikawa; Nemuro
- Stations: 59

Service
- Type: Regional rail
- Operator: JR Hokkaido
- Depot: Kushiro
- Rolling stock: KiHa 261 series DMU, KiHa 40 series DMU, KiHa 54 series DMU, H100 series DEMU

History
- Opened: 1901; 125 years ago
- Closed: 1 April 2024 (Furano–Shintoku)

Technical
- Line length: 386.2 km (240.0 mi)
- Num of tracks: Entire line single tracked
- Character: Rural
- Track gauge: 1,067 mm (3 ft 6 in)
- Electrification: None
- Operating speed: 120 km/h (75 mph) (max)
Route map

Nemuro Main Line (根室本線, Nemuro-honsen) is a railway line in Hokkaido. Following the closure of the Furano–Shintoku section on 1 April 2024, the line is operated by Hokkaido Railway Company (JR Hokkaido) in two sections, being Takikawa to Furano and Shintoku to Nemuro (including Obihiro and Kushiro). Nemuro is the most easterly situated station on the Japanese rail system.

== Services ==
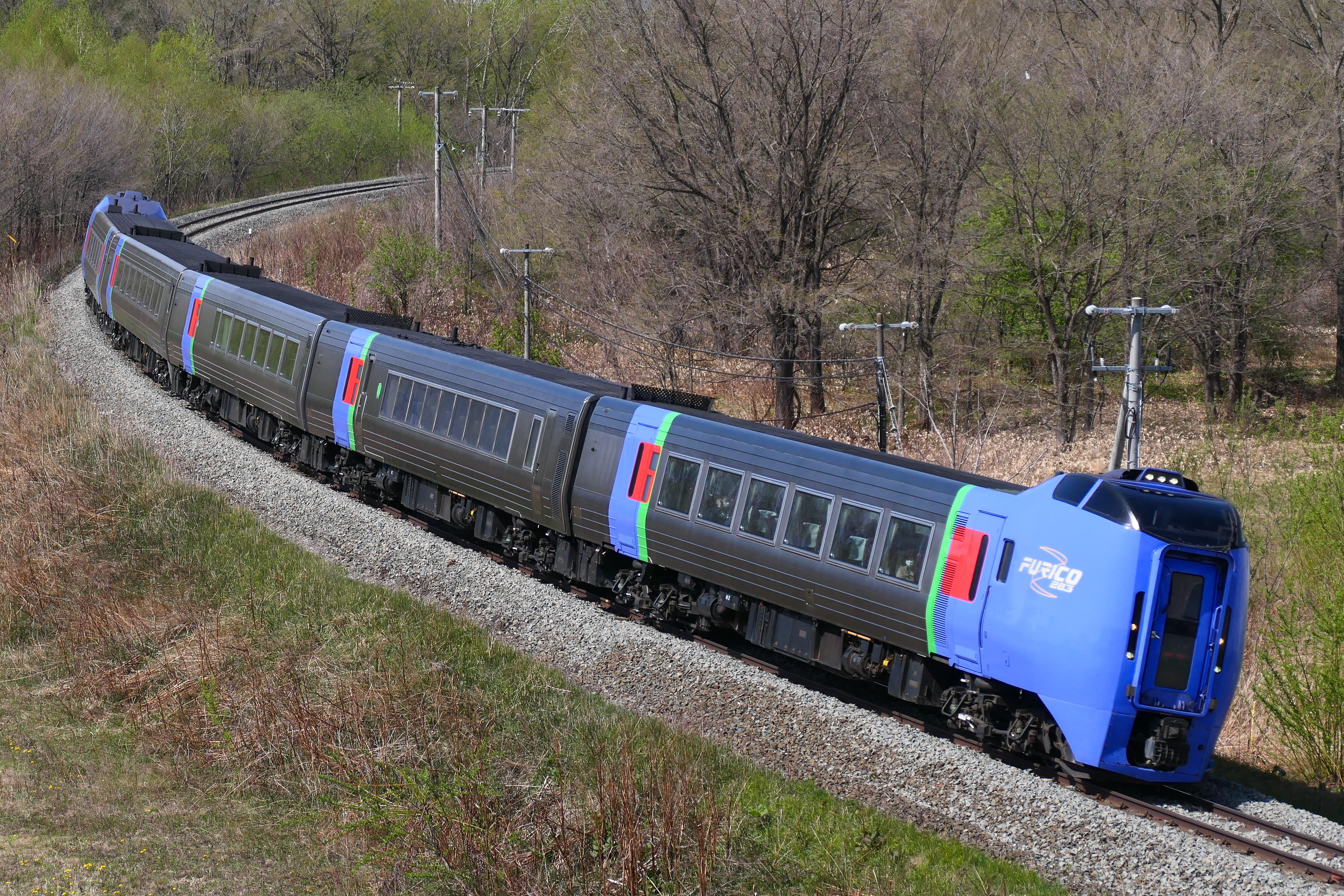
Ōzora limited express train

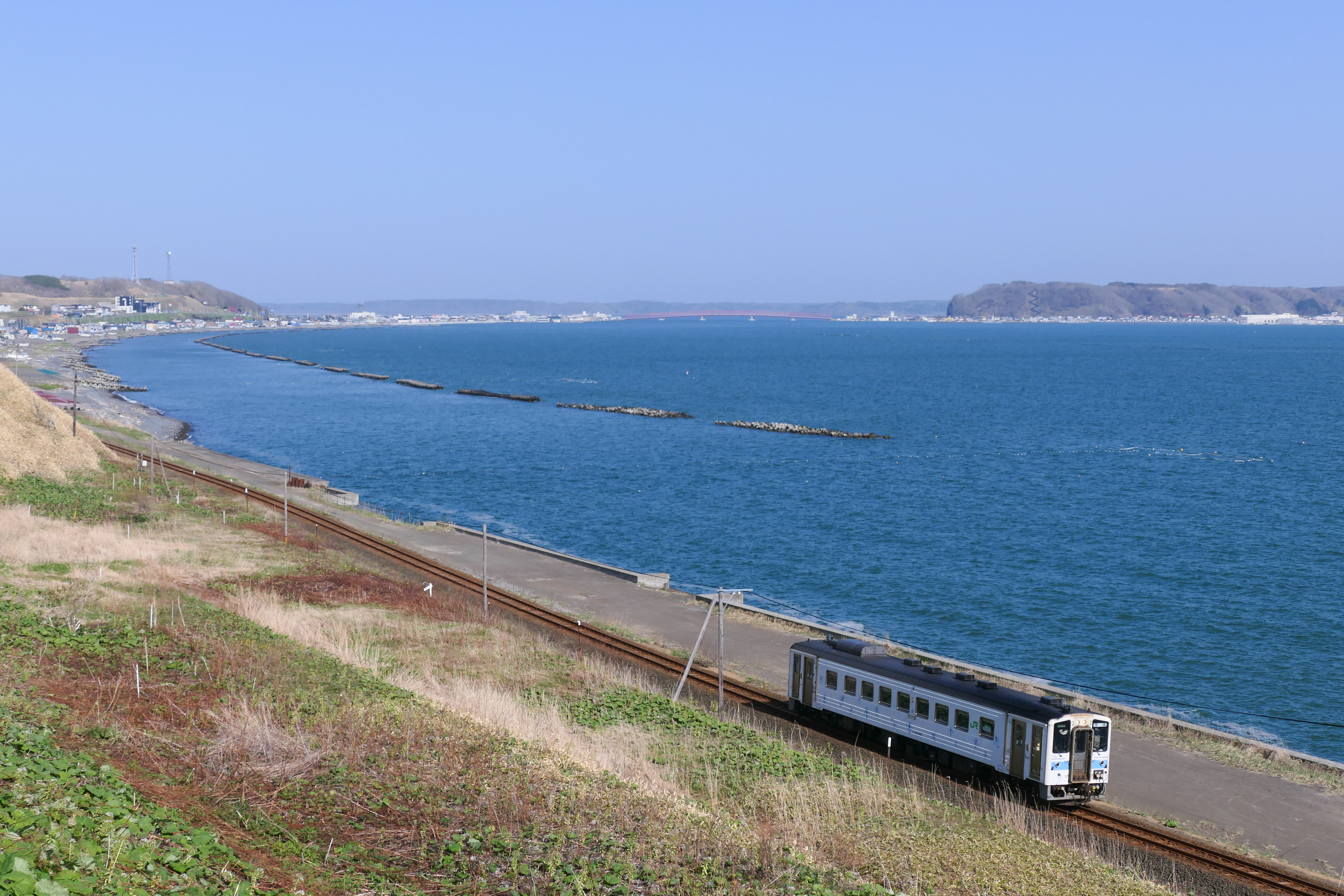
A KiHa 54-500 DMU on a local service

Nemuro Main Line local train pulling into Shin-Fuji, 2021

Map with main stations (as of 2024)

Local trains operate between Takikawa and Furano 9 times per day. Prior to August 2016 four trains per day operated between Furano and Higashi-Shikagoe. Due to typhoon damage sustained that month, the line was closed between Higashi-Shikagoe and Shintoku, and passengers transferred to a bus.

On 1 April 2024, the Furano–Shintoku section was closed, splitting the line in two.

The segment east of Shintoku forms part of the trunk route between Sapporo (via the Sekisho Line) and eastern Hokkaido, and has more frequent service, although with decreasing frequencies as the line goes east. The limited express train Ōzora runs between Sapporo and Kushiro six times a day, while the Tokachi runs five times a day between Sapporo and Obihiro. There are 11 daily local services between Shintoku and Ikeda, 8 daily local services between Ikeda and Urahoro, and 6 daily local services between Urahoro and Kushiro.

The segment between Kushiro and Nemuro has the official nickname Hanasaki Line (花咲線, Hanasaki-sen). There are two rapid trains Nosappu (ノサップ) and Hanasaki (はなさき) which run once a day each. Six daily local services operate between Kushiro and Attoko, and four or five operate to the eastern terminus at Nemuro. As of late 2022, this segment of the line saw frequent delays and cancellations due to deer incursions causing trains to make emergency stops.

Nemuro can be reached in a continuous 1,559.2 km train journey from Tokyo Station, which takes a total of just over 15 hours on four trains, departing Tokyo at 6:32 am and arriving in Nemuro at 9:39 pm.

== Stations ==
LE: Limited express
R: Rapid
All non-local trains stop at stations signed "+", some stop at "*", no such trains stop at "-". Local trains stop at all stations, except from Nunobe to Ochiai (no services since 2024 due to line closure), and stations marked "◌" where some local trains skip.

| No. | Station name | Japanese | Distance (km) | LE | R | Transfers | Location (all in Hokkaido) |
|---|---|---|---|---|---|---|---|
| A21 | Takikawa | 滝川 | 0.0 | | + | ■ Hakodate Main Line | Takikawa |
| T22 | Higashi-Takikawa | 東滝川 | 7.2 | | - | | Takikawa |
| T23 | Akabira | 赤平 | 13.7 | | + | | Akabira |
| T24 | Moshiri | 茂尻 | 17.2 | | + | | Akabira |
| T25 | Hiragishi | 平岸 | 20.7 | | - | | Akabira |
| T26 | Ashibetsu | 芦別 | 26.6 | | + | | Ashibetsu |
| T27 | Kami-Ashibetsu | 上芦別 | 30.5 | | + | | Ashibetsu |
| T28 | Nokanan | 野花南 | 35.2 | | * | | Ashibetsu |
| T30 | Furano | 富良野 | 54.6 | | + | ■ Furano Line | Furano |
| T31 | Nunobe | 布部 | 60.9 | | | | Furano |
| T32 | Yamabe | 山部 | 66.7 | | | | Furano |
| T33 | Shimo-Kanayama | 下金山 | 74.7 | | | | Minamifurano, Sorachi |
| T34 | Kanayama | 金山 | 81.6 | | | | Minamifurano, Sorachi |
| T35 | Higashi-Shikagoe | 東鹿越 | 94.8 | | | | Minamifurano, Sorachi |
| T36 | Ikutora | 幾寅 | 98.8 | | | | Minamifurano, Sorachi |
| T37 | Ochiai | 落合 | 108.2 | | | | Minamifurano, Sorachi |
| | Kami-Ochiai Junction | 上落合(信) | 112.2 | | | | Minamifurano, Sorachi |
| K23 | Shintoku | 新得 | 136.3 | + | + | ■ Sekishō Line | Shintoku, Kamikawa |
| K24 | Tokachi-Shimizu | 十勝清水 | 145.4 | * | + | | Shimizu, Kamikawa |
| K26 | Mikage | 御影 | 155.9 | - | - | | Shimizu, Kamikawa |
| K27 | Memuro | 芽室 | 166.5 | * | + | | Memuro, Kasai |
| K28 | Taisei | 大成 | 168.6 | - | - | | Memuro, Kasai |
| K29 | Nishi-Obihiro | 西帯広 | 173.4 | - | - | | Obihiro |
| K30 | Hakurindai | 柏林台 | 176.6 | - | - | | Obihiro |
| K31 | Obihiro | 帯広 | 180.1 | + | + | | Obihiro |
| K32 | Satsunai | 札内 | 184.9 | - | | | Makubetsu, Nakagawa |
| K34 | Makubetsu | 幕別 | 194.3 | - | | | Makubetsu, Nakagawa |
| K35 | Toshibetsu | 利別 | 200.8 | - | | | Ikeda, Nakagawa |
| K36 | Ikeda | 池田 | 204.3 | + | | | Ikeda, Nakagawa |
| K37 | Tōfutsu | 十弗 | 212.8 | - | | | Toyokoro, Nakagawa |
| K38 | Toyokoro | 豊頃 | 218.2 | - | | | Toyokoro, Nakagawa |
| K39 | Shin-Yoshino | 新吉野 | 225.3 | - | | | Urahoro, Tokachi |
| K40 | Urahoro | 浦幌 | 231.7 | * | | | Urahoro, Tokachi |
| K42 | Atsunai | 厚内 | 250.1 | - | | | Urahoro, Tokachi |
| K45 | Onbetsu | 音別 | 265.1 | - | | | Kushiro |
| K47 | Shiranuka | 白糠 | 281.1 | * | | | Shiranuka, Shiranuka |
| K48 | Nishi-Shoro | 西庶路 | 286.5 | - | | | Shiranuka, Shiranuka |
| K49 | Shoro | 庶路 | 288.6 | - | | | Shiranuka, Shiranuka |
| K50 | Otanoshike | 大楽毛 | 299.0 | - | | | Kushiro |
| K51 | Shin-Otanoshike ◌ | 新大楽毛 | 300.8 | - | | | Kushiro |
| K52 | Shin-Fuji | 新富士 | 305.7 | - | | | Kushiro |
| K53 | Kushiro | 釧路 | 308.4 | + | + | | Kushiro |
| B54 | Higashi-Kushiro | 東釧路 | 311.3 | | * | ■ Senmō Main Line | Kushiro |
| | Musa | 武佐 | 312.5 | | * | | Kushiro |
| | Beppo | 別保 | 317.0 | | * | | Kushiro Town, Kushiro |
| | Kami-Oboro | 上尾幌 | 331.7 | | * | | Akkeshi, Akkeshi |
| | Oboro | 尾幌 | 340.9 | | - | | Akkeshi, Akkeshi |
| | Monshizu | 門静 | 350.1 | | - | | Akkeshi, Akkeshi |
| | Akkeshi | 厚岸 | 355.0 | | + | | Akkeshi, Akkeshi |
| | Chanai | 茶内 | 375.2 | | + | | Hamanaka, Akkeshi |
| | Hamanaka | 浜中 | 382.2 | | + | | Hamanaka, Akkeshi |
| | Anebetsu | 姉別 | 392.3 | | - | | Hamanaka, Akkeshi |
| | Attoko | 厚床 | 398.9 | | + | | Nemuro |
| | Bettoga ◌ | 別当賀 | 414.5 | | * | | Nemuro |
| | Ochiishi | 落石 | 424.8 | | + | | Nemuro |
| | Konbumori ◌ | 昆布盛 | 428.8 | | * | | Nemuro |
| | Nishi-Wada ◌ | 西和田 | 433.6 | | * | | Nemuro |
| | ~~Higashi-Nemuro~~ | 東根室 | 442.3 | | | | Nemuro |
| | Nemuro | 根室 | 443.8 | | + | | Nemuro |

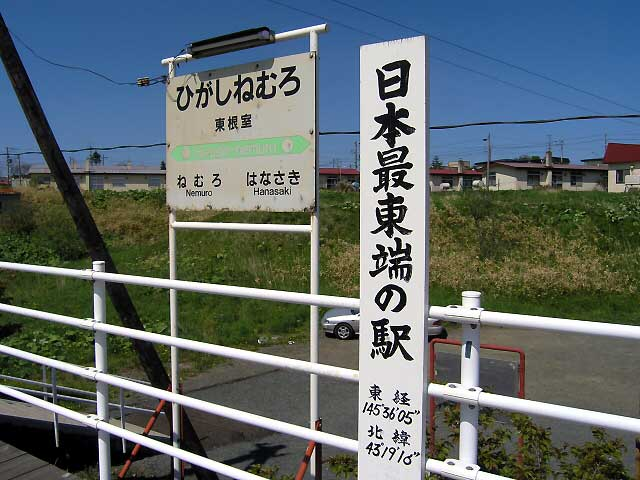
Higashi-Nemuro Station, the former easternmost railway station in Japan (closed in March 2025)

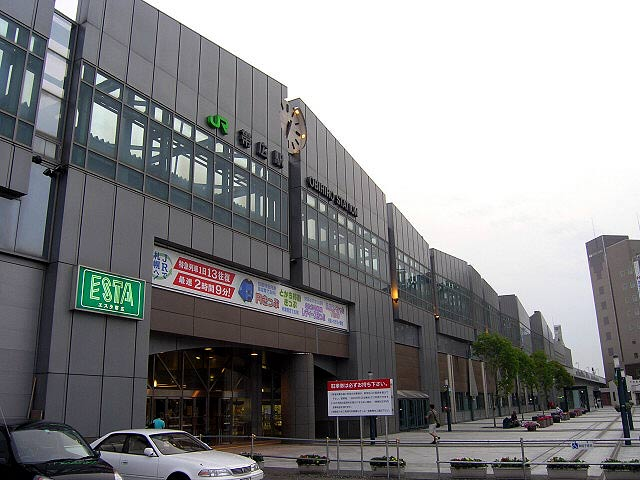
Obihiro Station

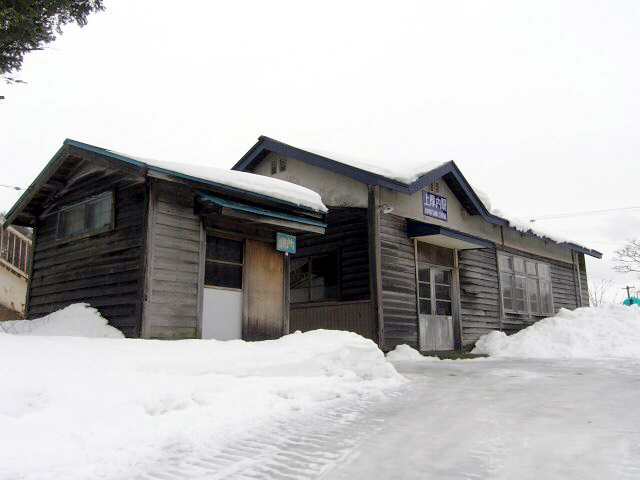
Kami-Atsunai Station

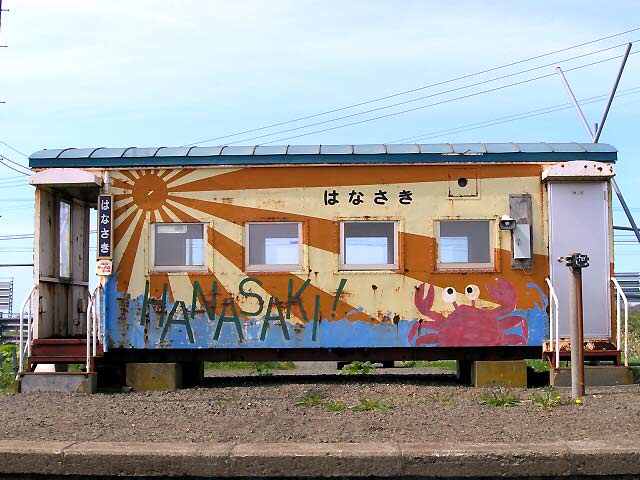
Hanasaki Station (closed in March 2016)

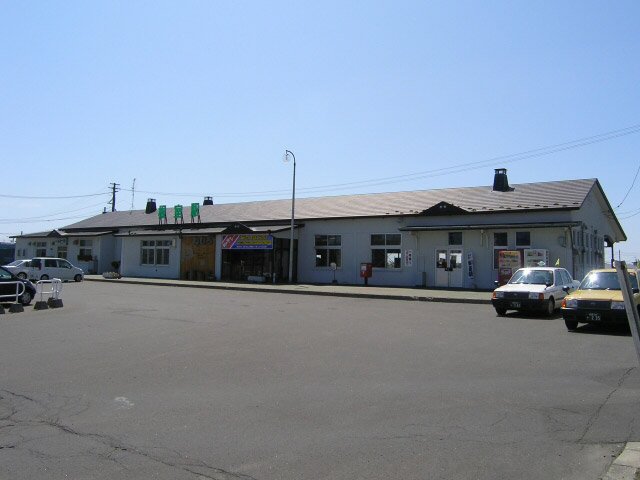
Nemuro Station, the easternmost railway station in Japan

== History ==
The line was built as a link line between central and eastern Hokkaido, by Hokkaido Government Railway (北海道官設鉄道, Hokkaidō Kansetsu Tetsudō). The first section of the current Nemuro Line was opened between Kushiro–Shiranuka in 1901. The line was extended westward, reaching Furano in 1907. In 1913 the Furano–Takikawa section opened, shortening the route by 53.5 km. The first section, originally included as part of the Nemuro Line, become classified as the Furano Line in 1913.

In 1911, 1st class sleeping accommodation was included on the Hakodate to Kushiro train, and a dining car was added from 1916.

The first section of the line east of Kushiro opened in 1917, reaching Nemuro in 1921.

In 1966, two major deviations opened, the first, east of Kanayama, associated with the construction of the Kanayama Dam, and the second between Ochiai and Shintoku, including the 5,790 m Shinkarikachi tunnel allowing the line to bypass the 1907 Karikachi tunnel and associated 1 in 40 (2.5%) grades.

In 1971, a refrigerated container train was introduced between Kushiro and Tokyo.

In 1990, a new tunnel and associated alignment opened near Atsunai, and a deviation near Shimanoshita associated with the construction of the Takisato Dam was opened in 1991. The completion of the dam led to Takisato Station being closed in the same yaer and submerged underwater in 1999.

=== Decline and closures ===
In 1981, the Sekishō Line opened between Shin-Yubari and Shintoku, becoming the main route between central and southeastern Hokkaido and shortening the distance for stations east of Shintoku to Sapporo. This led to a rapid decline in ridership on the Furano-Shintoku segment of the Nemuro Main Line, from 4,664 a day in 1980 to 654 a day in 1985. Population decline in the area also contributed to a decline in ridership. By 2015, only 152 people per day were using this segment of the line, most of whom were commuting senior high school students.

On 31 August 2016, torrential rainfall damaged the 17.4 km section between Higashi-Shikagoe and Kami-Ochiai Junction resulting in the passenger service from Higashi-Shikagoe to Shintoku being replaced by a bus. Thereafter, on 19 November 2016, JR Hokkaido's president announced plans to rationalise the network by up to 1,237 km, or ~50% of the current network, including closure of the Nemuro Line between Furano and Kami-Ochiai Junction. In January 2022, the four local governments between Furano and Shintoku gave up on maintaining this segment of the line, and in December the president of JR Hokkaido announced a goal to convert this portion to bus service in 2023 or thereafter. A notice of abolition was submitted on March 31, 2023.

The section between Kushiro and Nemuro was also proposed for conversion to Third Sector operation, but if local governments were not agreeable, such sections would also face closure. In April 2021, Nemuro City raised over 50 million yen through crowdfunding to keep the eastern Hanasaki Line portion open, after JR Hokkaido stated that the line was difficult to maintain on its own. As of mid-2021, this portion of the line saw only about 200 passengers per day.

On 4 March 2017, 3 more stations were closed - Shimanoshita Station (T29), Kami-Atsunai Station (K41) and Inashibetsu Station (K33). On 17 March the following year, Haobi Station (K25) was closed.

On 16 March 2019, Chokubetsu Station (K43), Shakubetsu Station (K44) and Hattaushi Station were closed, two of these becoming signal points: Chokubetsu and Shakubetsu.

On 14 March 2020, Furuse Station (K46) was closed, reducing the number of stations on the Nemuro Main Line to 60.

Map of section Nemuro Main Line closed at 2024

On 1 April 2024 the section of the line between Furano and Shintoku closed, splitting the line in two. On the same day five stations (Higashi-Takikawa (T22), Atsunai (K42), Oboro, Bettoga and Kombumori) were slated to be abolished owing to low ridership.

=== Former connecting lines ===
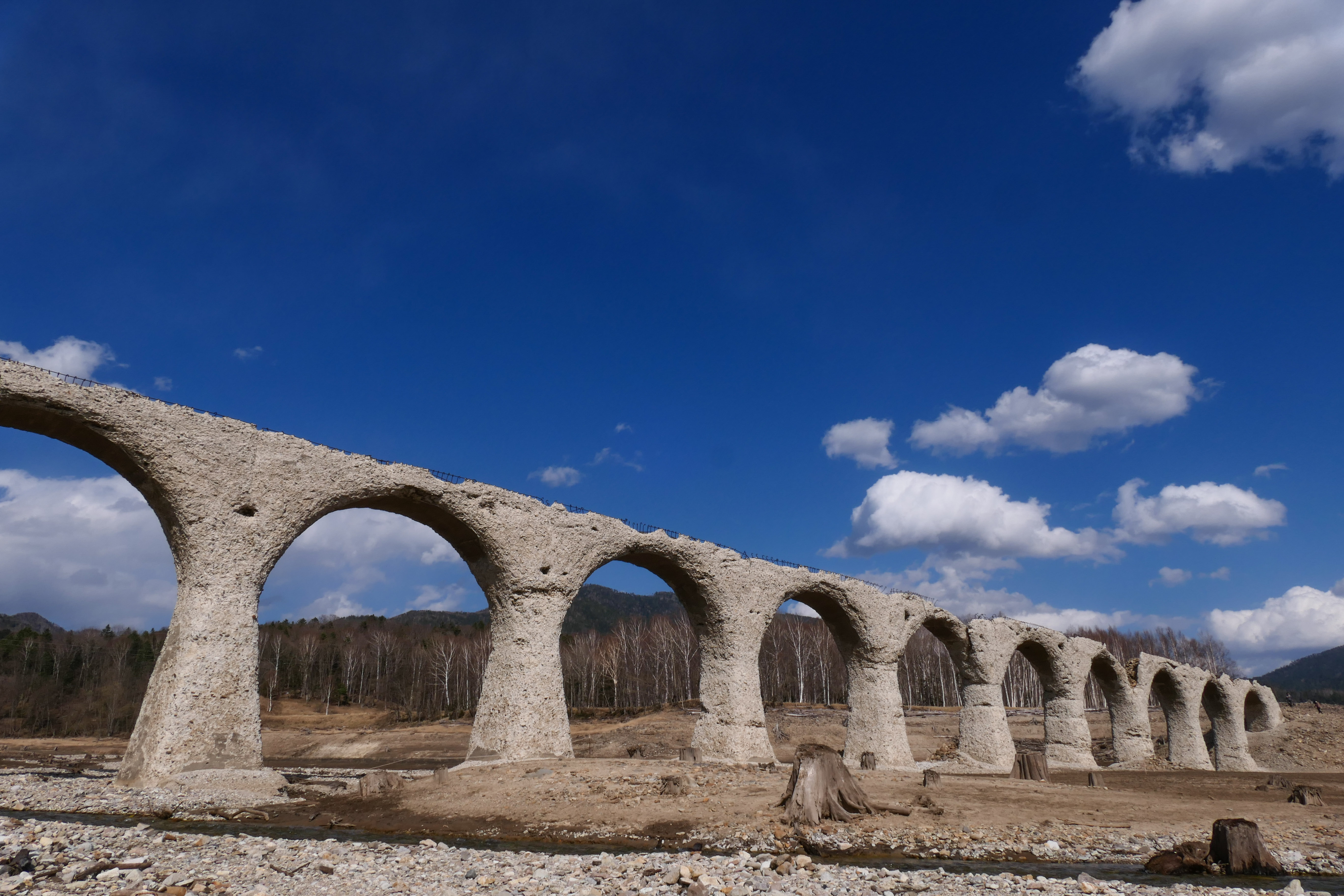
Taushubetsu bridge on the former Tokachi Mitsuma line

==== Ashibetsu area ====
- Ashibetsu station – The Mitsui Mining Co. opened a 10 km line to Tamagawa in 1940/45. A 3 car DMU provided a passenger service 1958–72. The line closed in 1989.
- Kamiashibetsu station

The Mitsubishi Mining Co. opened an 8 km line to Penke Sanko in 1949, and a 1 km branch to the Yuya mine in 1954. Both closed with the mine in 1964.

A 762 mm (2 ft 6.0 in) gauge logging tramway was operated from Kamiashibetsu commencing 1934. By 1954 it had a 31 km 'main line' and 5 branches totalling 44 km. The lines closed in 1961 when log trucks replaced the tramway.

==== Shintoku area ====
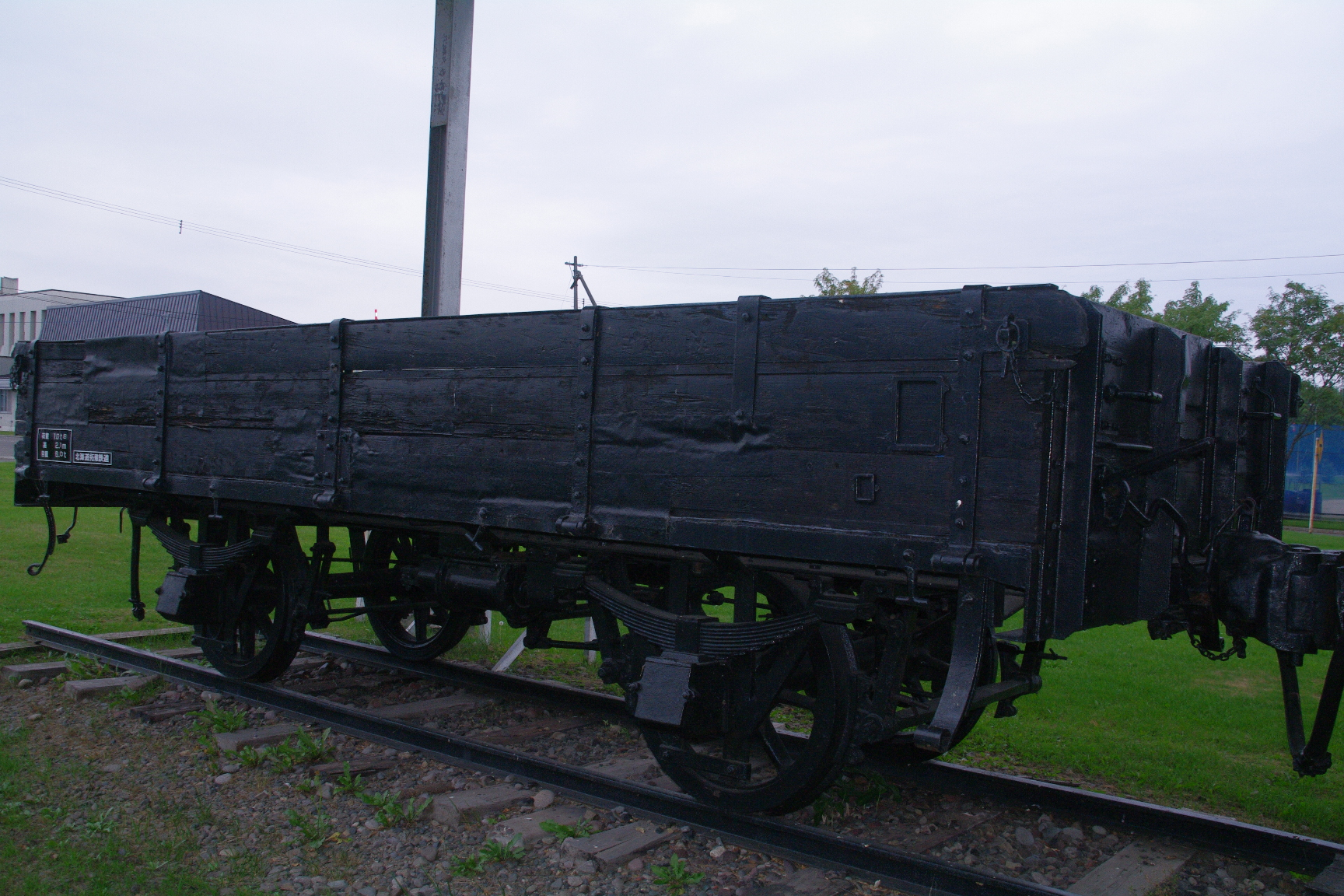
Wagon used on the Kamishihoro line

- Shintoku station – A private 54 km line operated to Kamishihoro, where it connected to the JR Shihoro line (see below). Opened 1928/31, it closed beyond Urimaku in 1949. The remaining 29 km section closed in 1968. The Tokachi–Bandaibashi line (see below) crossed the line twice.
- Tokachi station – A 29 km 762mm line built to haul sugar beets operated to Bandaibashi opened between 1925 and 1928, with 4 branches totalling 28 km. The lines closed in 1951.

==== Obihiro area ====
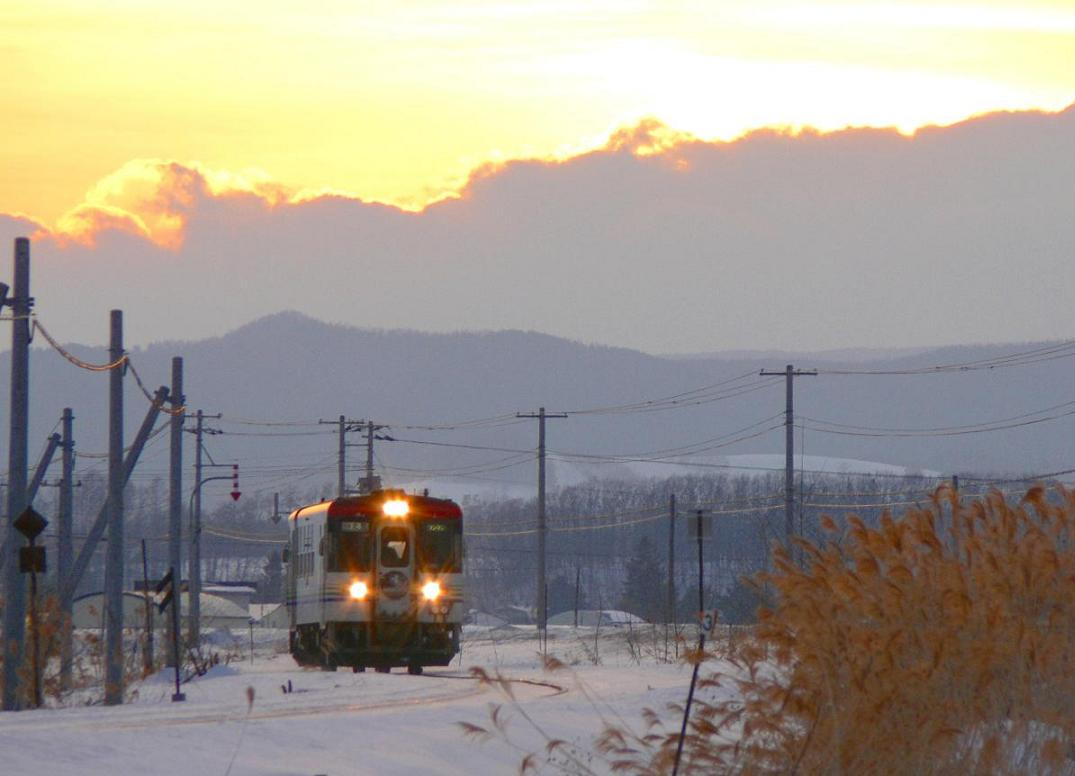
Former Chihoku line, 2006

- Obihiro station

The 78 km Shihoro Line to Tokachi Mitsuma opened in sections between 1925 and 1939. An 18 km deviation built in association with the Nukabira Dam opened in 1955. The line closed in 1987.

The 84 km Hiroo Line opened between 1929 & 1932 and was closed in 1987. A proposal to extend the line to Samani and connect to the Hidaka Main Line did not eventuate.

A 4 km private 1,067 mm (3 ft 6.0 in) line connected a sugar beet factory to Obihiro. The sugar beets were transported to the factory by a 3 line 762mm gauge network totalling 59 km, which operated 1924–77.

- Ikeda station – The 140 km Chihoku line was the original line to Abashiri and connected to the Sekihoku Main Line at Kitami, opening 1910/12. It was transferred to private operation in 1989, and closed in 2006.

==== Shakubetsu–Higashi-Kushiro section ====
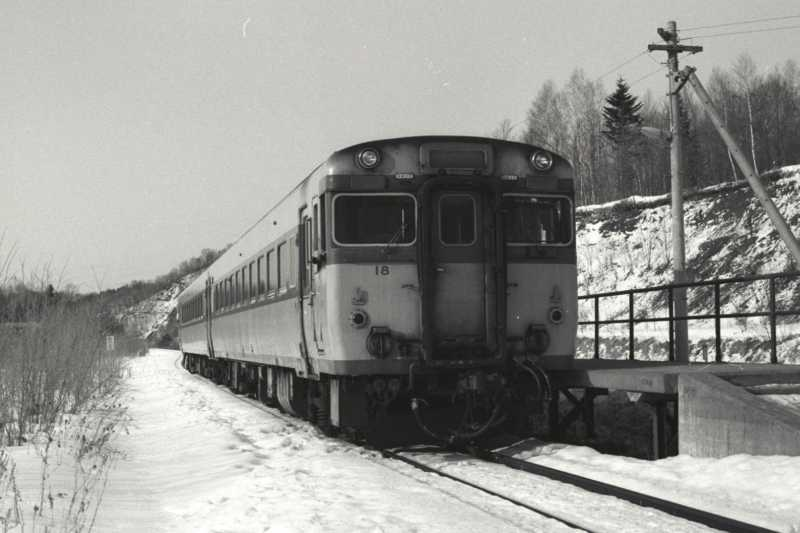
Hokushin station in winter

- Shakubetsu station – The Mitsubishi Mining Co. opened an 11 km 762mm gauge line to Sumiyama in 1920. The line was re-gauged to 1067mm in 1942 and closed with the mine in 1970.
- Shiranuka station – A 25 km Shiranuka Line to Kamicharo opened in 1964, and was extended 8 km to Hokushin in 1972. The line closed in 1983.
- Shinfuji station – A 29 km 762mm gauge horse-drawn tramway was opened to Nakasetsuri in 1929. A charcoal gas-powered locomotive was introduced in 1941, and a 19 km branch to Shinhororo opened in 1943. The lines closed in 1967/68.
- Kushiro station – The Mitsubishi Mining Co. also operated a 44 km line from Kushiro–Yubetsu Sumiyama, opened 1923/26 and closed with the mine in 1970. It also connected to the Nemuro line at Shinfuji, where a 2 km line connecting to a wharf operated 1951–84, ownership of it transferring to the Kushiro Port Co in 1970.
- Higashi Kushiro station – The Pacific Ocean Coal Co. opened a 6 km line from a coal mine at Harutori to Irifune-cho wharf in 1926/27, with a 3 km line connecting the mine to Higashi-Kushiro opening in 1928. Passenger services ceased in 1963, and the line was truncated 2 km in 1966 when a new coal loading wharf opened. The Higashi–Kushiro–Harutori section closed in 1986, with the remaining 4 km Taiheiyo line continuing to operate as the only remaining colliery line in Japan.

==== Hamanaka–Nemuro section ====
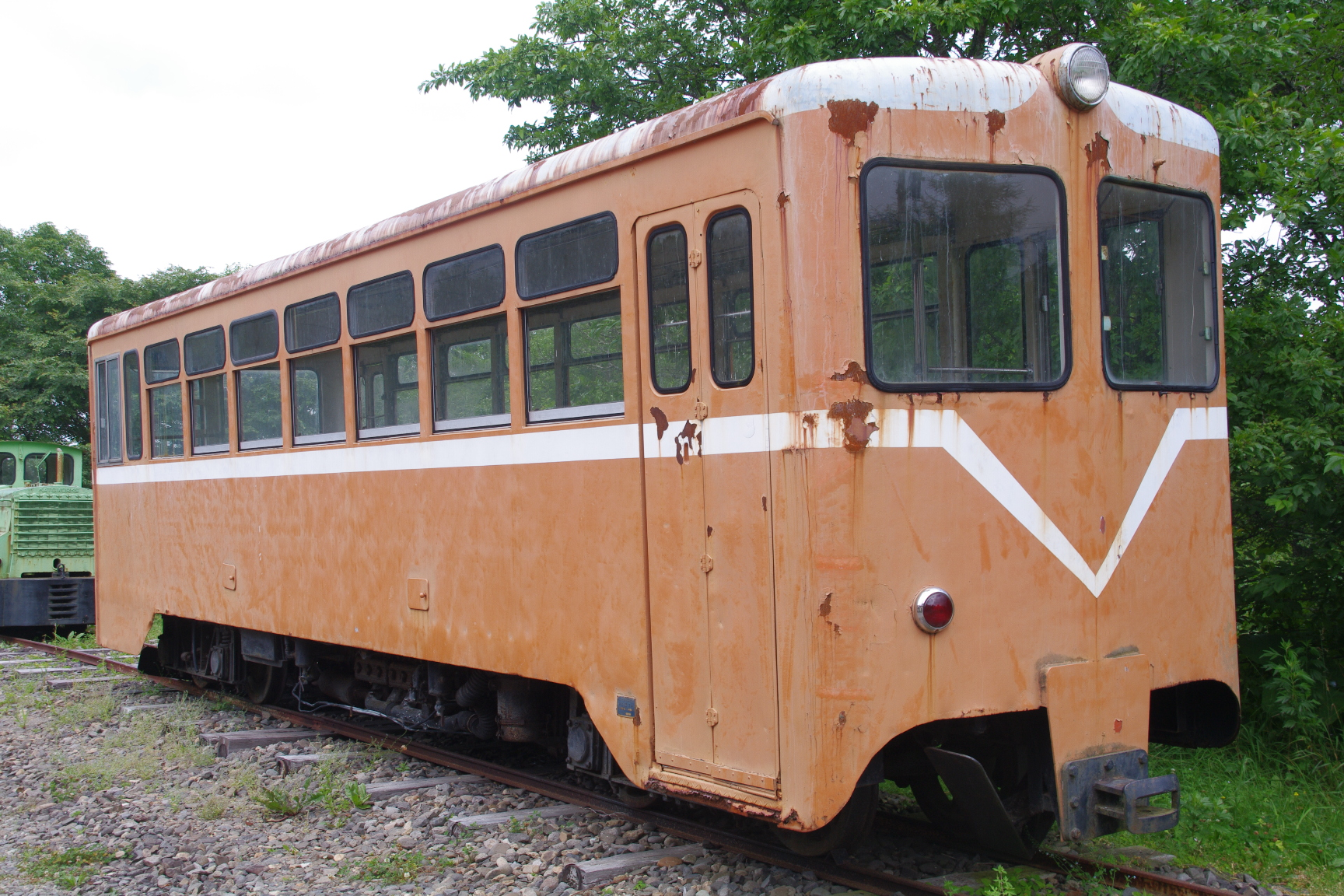
1963 railcar from the Shibetsu development lines

- Hamanaka station – The Hamanaka Prefectural Government operated a 762mm gauge network of 3 lines totalling 27 km opened between 1929 and 1932, closing 1972.
- Attoko station – In 1925 a horse-drawn 762mm tramway opened to Nakashibetsu, being replaced by a 1067mm line in 1933, which closed in 1989. It connected to a branch from Shibecha (on the Senmo Main Line) to Shibetsu which operated between 1936 and 1989, the two branches being known collectively as the Shibetsu Line. A total of 9 separate 762mm gauge development lines connected to stations along the Shibetsu Line were built between 1930 and 1963, the last closing in 1971.
- Nemuro – A 15 km 762mm gauge line operated to Habomai between 1929 and 1959 to transport kelp to the Nemuro port (located about 1 km from the Nemuro JR station), is the most easterly railway in Japan. A proposed 7 km extension to Cape Nosappu was not built.

== See also ==
- List of railway lines in Japan
- Poppoya – 1999 blockbuster Japanese movie set at a fictional station (based on Ikutora Station) on the Nemuro Main Line
