= Higashi-Takikawa Station =

Railway station in Takikawa, Hokkaido, Japan

Coordinates: 43°34′26″N 141°58′50″E

T22 Higashi-Takikawa Station 東滝川駅
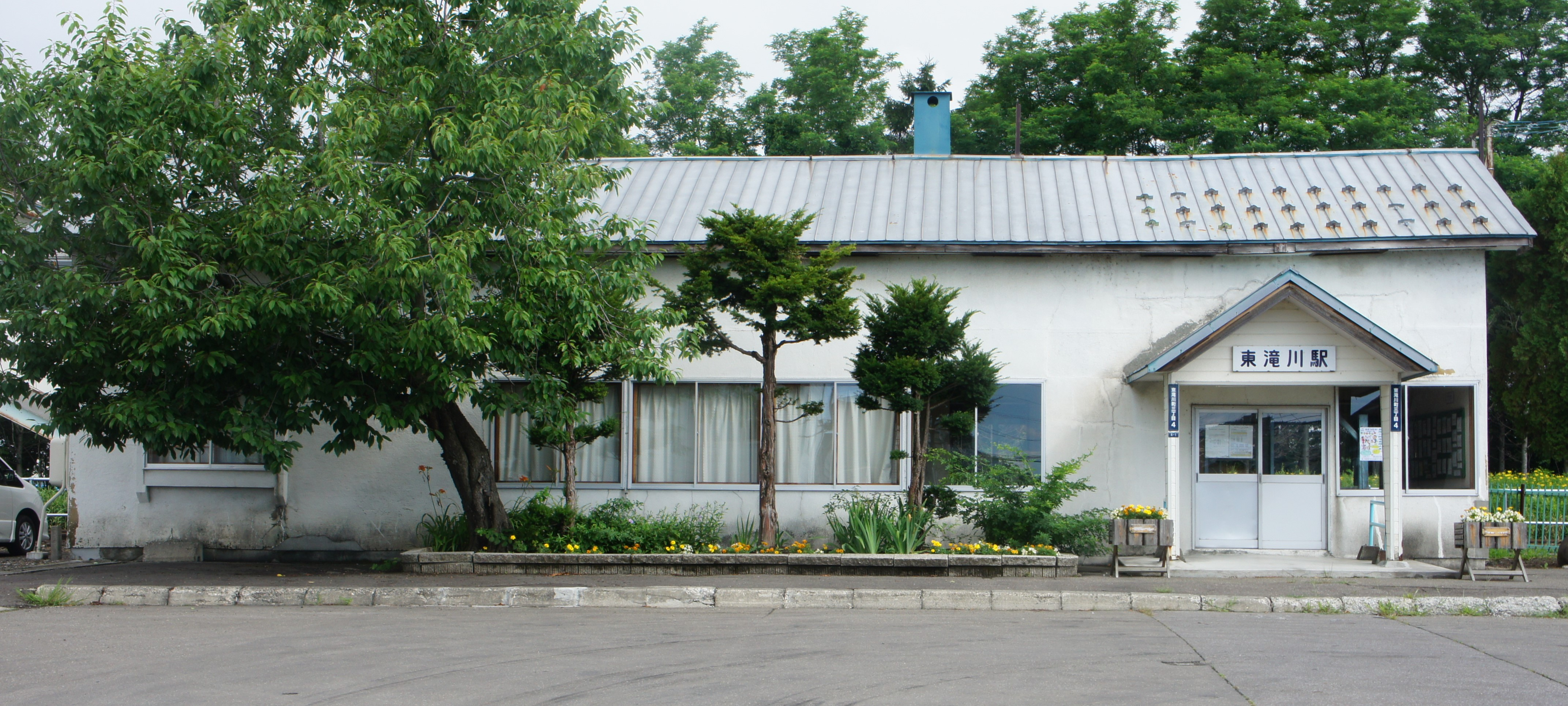
- JR Nemuro-Main-Line Higashi-Takikawa Station building

General information
- Location: Higashi Takikawa, Takikawa City; Hokkaido Prefecture; Japan
- Operator: JR Hokkaido
- Line: Nemuro Main Line
- Platforms: 2 side platforms
- Tracks: 2

Construction
- Structure type: At grade

Other information
- Station code: T22

History
- Opened: 10 November 1913
- Closed: 14 March 2025

Passengers
- 2014: 6 daily

Services
Preceding station	JR Hokkaido	Following station
Takikawa A21 Terminus	Nemuro Main Line	Akabira T23 towards Nemuro
Location
- Location within Hokkaido Location within Japan

Higashi-Takikawa Station (東滝川駅, Higashi-Takikawa-eki) was a railway station on the Nemuro Main Line of JR Hokkaido located in Takikawa, Hokkaidō, Japan. The station opened on 10 November 1913 and closed on 14 March 2025. The station was closed due to low number of passengers.

== History ==
In June 2023, this station was selected to be among 42 stations on the JR Hokkaido network to be slated for abolition owing to low ridership.

In December 2024, JR Hokkaido confirmed the station would be abolished on 14 March 2025.
