= Ikutora Station =

Railway station in Minamifurano, Hokkaido, Japan

Coordinates: 43°9′42″N 142°34′10″E

Ikutora Station 幾寅駅
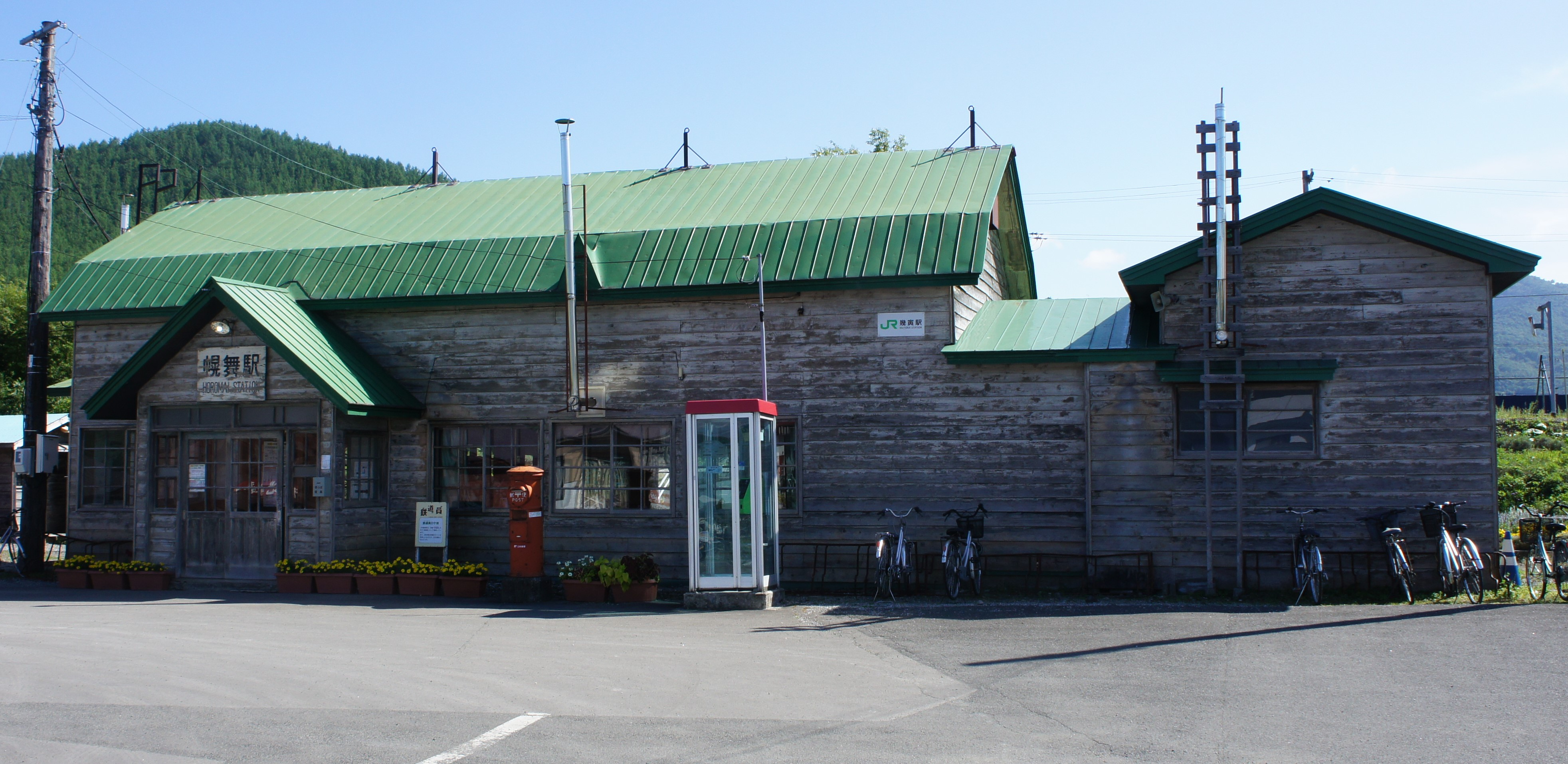

General information
- Location: Minamifurano, Sorachi, Hokkaido; Japan
- Operator: JR Hokkaido
- Line: Nemuro Main Line

Other information
- Station code: T36

History
- Opened: 6 December 1902
- Closed: 1 April 2024
Location

Ikutora Station (幾寅駅, Ikutora-eki) was a railway station on the Nemuro Main Line of JR Hokkaido located in Minamifurano, Hokkaidō, Japan.

The station, which first opened on 6 December 1902, was used as the fictional Horomai Station (幌舞駅) in Yasuo Furuhata's 1999 film Poppoya. The station building still displays a signboard reading Horomai, not Ikutora, over the front entrance.

== Closure ==
In 2016, the section of the Nemuro Main Line between Shintoku and Higashi-Shikagoe underwent extensive damage due to heavy rainfall. Since then, a substitute bus service was put in place serving this section of the Nemuro Main Line. However, in 2024 it was decided that this station, along with the rest of the Nemuro Main Line between Furano and Shintoku, would be closed permanently effective 1 April of that year.

== Adjacent stations ==
Hokkaido Railway Company
Nemuro Main Line

Higashi-Shikagoe T35 – Ikutora T36 – Ochiai T37
