= Yamabe =

Yamabe may refer to:

== People with the surname ==
- Toshiro Yamabe, Japanese go player (山部)(
- Hidehiko Yamabe, Japanese mathematician (山辺)
- Kanae Yamabe, Japanese judoka (山部)

== Places ==
- Yamabe District, Nara, Japan (山辺)
- Yamabe Station, Hokkaido, Japan (山部)
