= Kanayama Station =

Kanayama Station is the name of three train stations in Japan.

- Kanayama Station (Aichi) in Nagoya, Aichi Prefecture
- Kanayama Station (Fukuoka) in Fukuoka, Fukuoka Prefecture
- Kanayama Station (Hokkaido) in Sorachi District, Hokkaido

== See also ==
- Kanayama-cho Station in Naka-ku, Hiroshima
- Shimo-Kanayama Station in Minamifurano, Hokkaido
