= Haobi Station =

Railway station in Shimizu, Hokkaido, Japan

Coordinates: 42.9579°N 142.9063°E

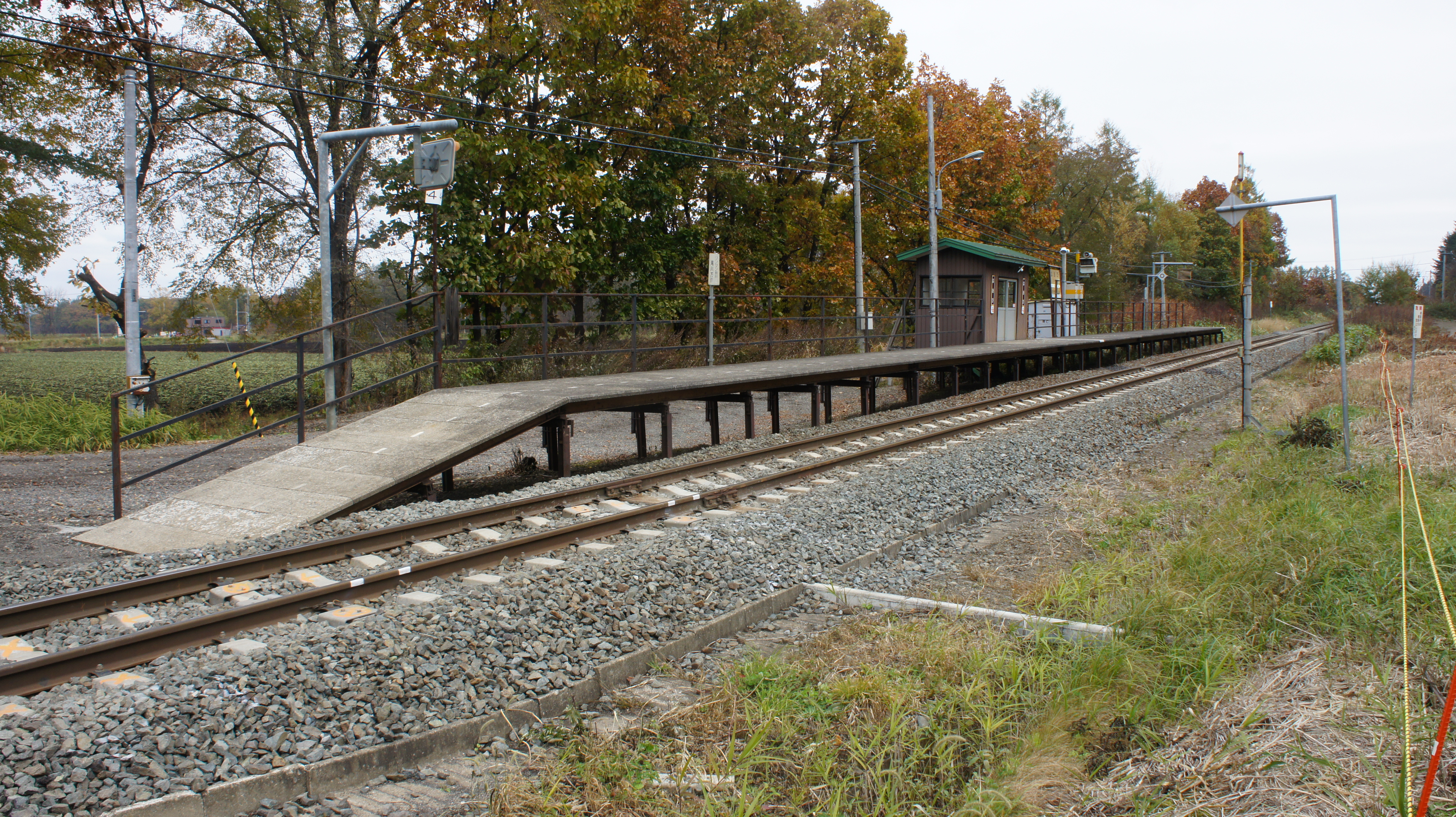
JR Nemuro Main Line Haobi railway

Haobi Station (羽帯駅, Haobi-eki) was a train station in Shimizu, Kamikawa District, Hokkaidō, Japan.

The station closed on 17 March 2018 owing to poor patronage.

== Lines ==
- Hokkaido Railway Company
  - Nemuro Main Line Station K25

== Adjacent stations ==
«	Service	»
Nemuro Main Line
Rapid: Does not stop at this station
Limited Express Ōzora: Does not stop at this station
Limited Express Super Tokachi: Does not stop at this station
Tokachi-Shimizu	Local	Mikage
