= Nunobe Station =

Railway station in Furano, Hokkaido, Japan

Coordinates: 43°17′31″N 142°24′01″E

Nunobe Station (布部駅, Nunobe-eki) was a railway station on the Nemuro Main Line of JR Hokkaido located in Furano, Hokkaidō, Japan. The station opened on December 26, 1927.

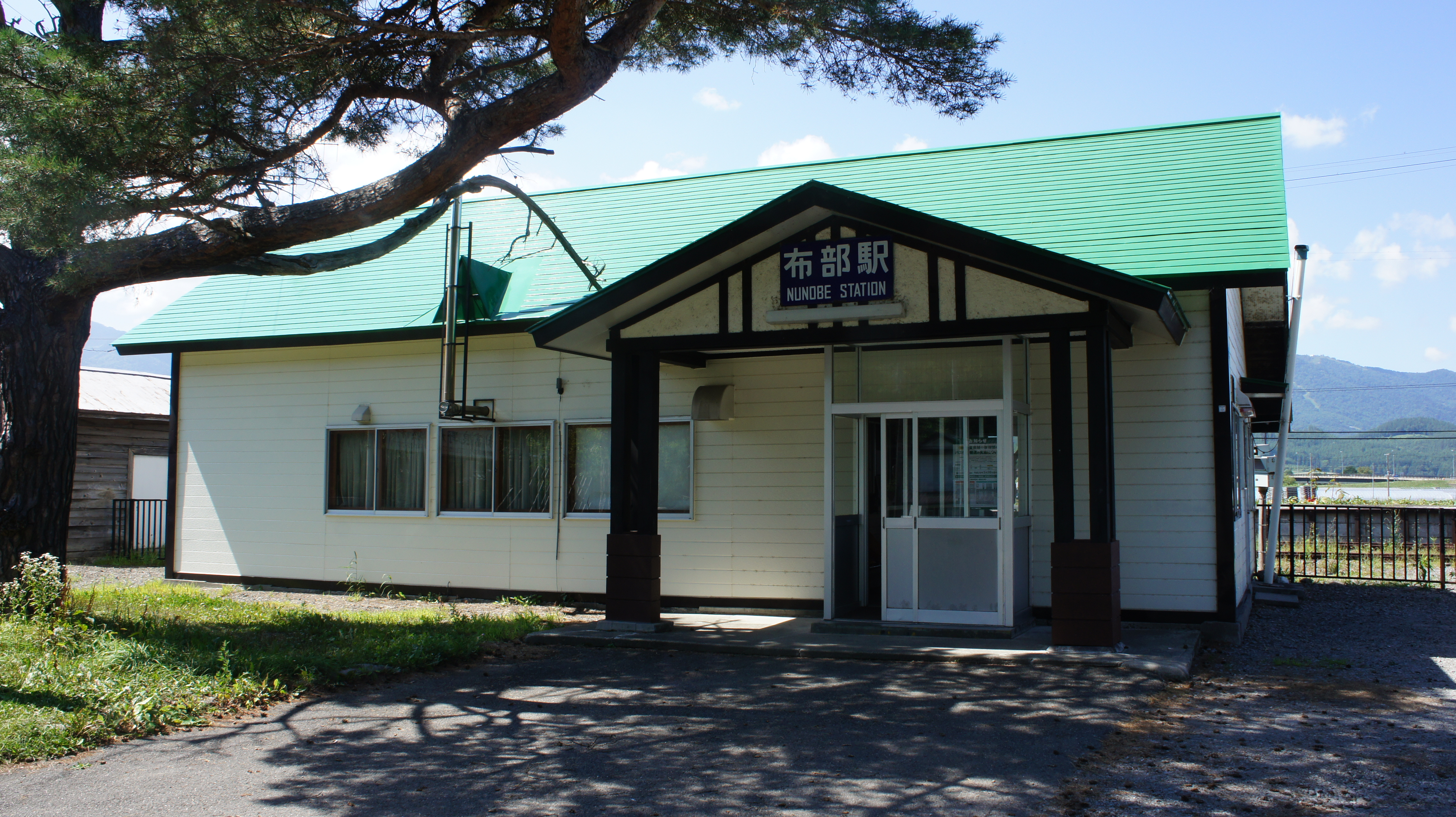
Station building

== Closure ==
In 2024, it was decided that this station, along with the rest of the Nemuro Main Line between Furano and Shintoku, would be closed permanently effective 1 April of that year.
