= Hattaushi Station =

Railway station in Nemuro, Hokkaido, Japan

Coordinates: 43°12′16″N 145°19′22″E

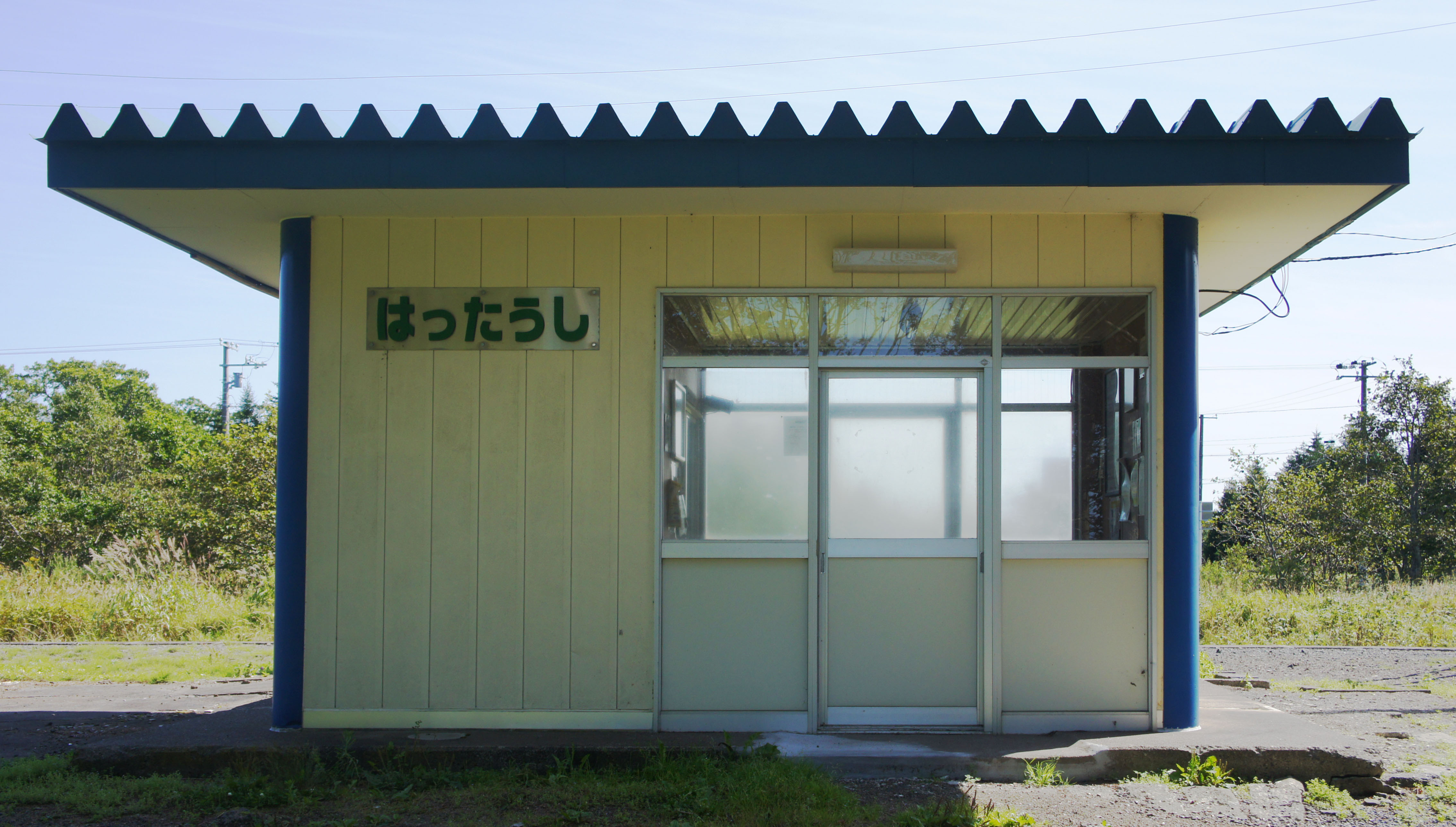
Station building (September 2018)

Hattaushi Station (初田牛駅, Hattaushi-eki) was a railway station on the Nemuro Main Line of JR Hokkaido located in Nemuro, Hokkaidō, Japan.

The station was closed permanently on 16 March 2019.
