= Bettoga Station =

Railway station in Nemuro, Hokkaido, Japan

Coordinates: 43°13′06″N 145°25′25″E

Bettoga Station 別当賀駅
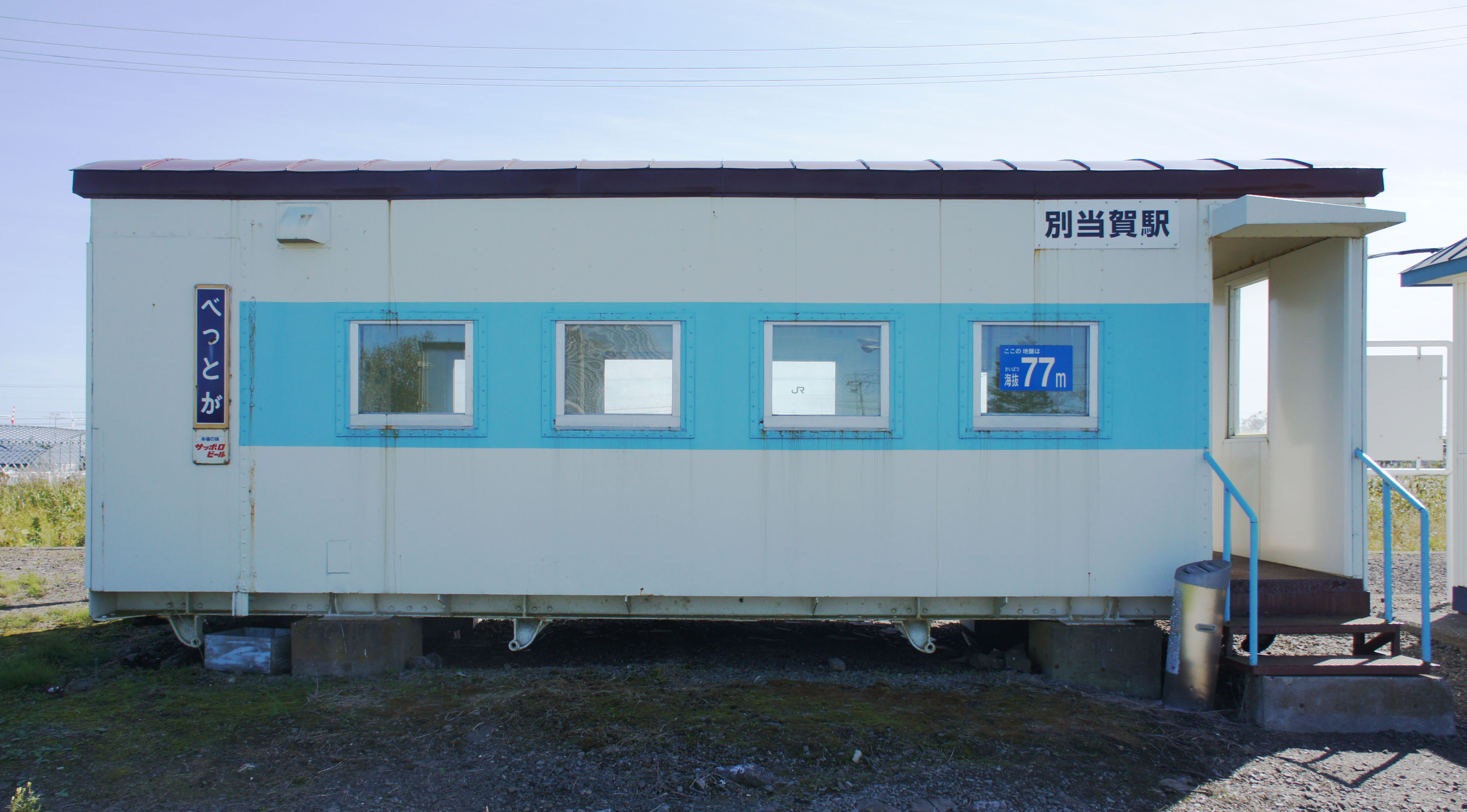
- Bettoga Station (September 2018)

General information
- Location: Nemuro, Hokkaido; Japan
- Operator: Hokkaido Railway Company
- Line: ■ Nemuro Main Line
- Platforms: 1 Side platform
- Tracks: 1

Construction
- Structure type: At-grade
- Accessible: No

History
- Opened: 10 November 1920
Location
- Location within Japan

Bettoga Station (別当賀駅, Bettoga-eki) is a railway station on the Nemuro Main Line of JR Hokkaido located in Nemuro, Hokkaidō, Japan.

The station opened on 10 November 1920.

== History ==
=== Future plans ===
In June 2023, this station was selected to be among 42 stations on the JR Hokkaido network to be slated for abolition owing to low ridership.
