= Inashibetsu Station =

Railway station in Makubetsu, Hokkaido, Japan

Inashibetsu Station 稲士別駅
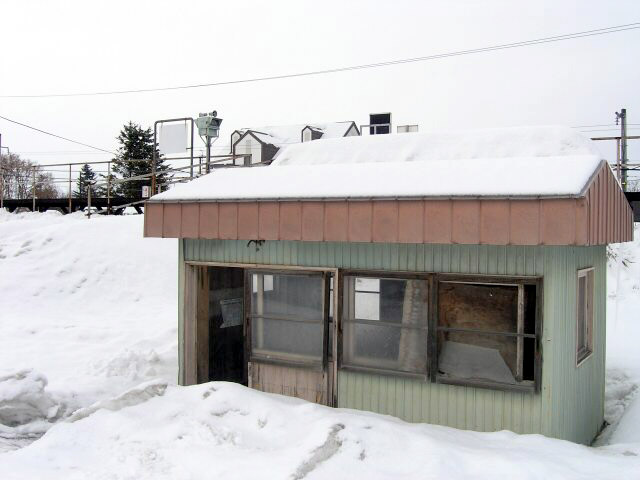

General information
- Location: Japan
- Coordinates: 42°54′14.33″N 143°17′51.08″E
- Operator: JR Hokkaido
- Line: Nemuro Main Line
- Distance: 188.5 kilometers from Takikawa
- Platforms: 1 side platform

History
- Opened: 7 October 1959
- Closed: 4 March 2017
Location

Inashibetsu Station (稲士別駅, Inashibetsu-eki) was a train station in Makubetsu, Nakagawa District, Hokkaidō, Japan. It was closed on March 4, 2017.

== Lines ==
- Hokkaido Railway Company
  - Nemuro Main Line Station K33

== Adjacent stations ==
«	Service	»
Nemuro Main Line
Limited Express Ōzora: Does not stop at this station
Satsunai	Local	Makubetsu
