= Nemuro Station =

Railway station in Nemuro, Hokkaido, Japan

Nemuro Station 根室駅
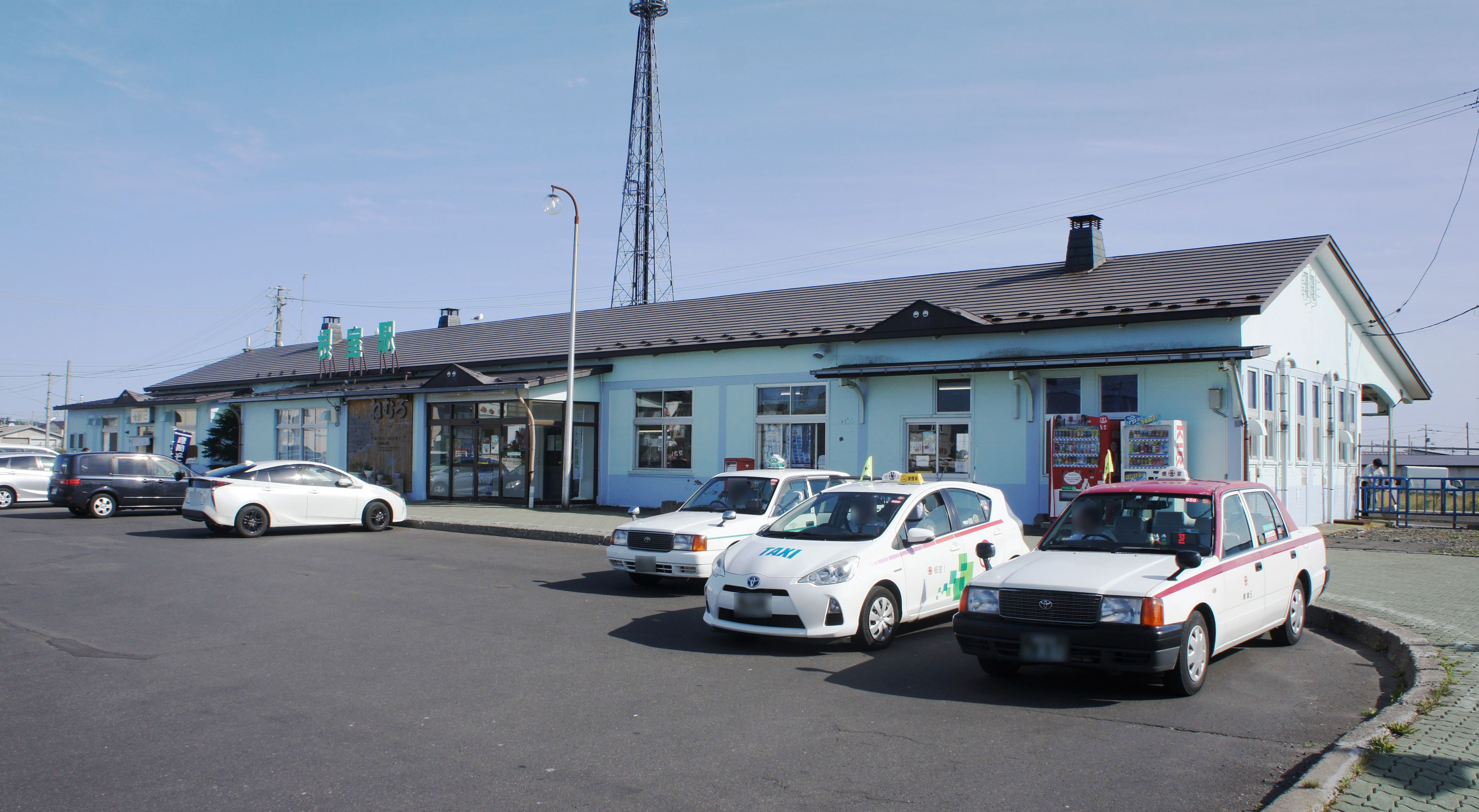
- Nemuro Station (September 2018)

General information
- Location: 2-chome Kowacho, Nemuro City, Nemuro Subprefecture; Hokkaido Prefecture; Japan
- Coordinates: 43.326926°N 145.582731°E
- Operator: JR Hokkaido
- Line: Nemuro Main Line
- Platforms: 1 side platform
- Tracks: 1

Construction
- Structure type: At grade

History
- Opened: 5 August 1921; 105 years ago

Passengers
- 2019: 176 daily

Services
| Preceding station | JR Hokkaido | Following station |
|---|---|---|
| Nishi-Wada towards Takikawa | Nemuro Main Line | Terminus |
Location
- Location within Hokkaido Location within Japan

Nemuro Station (根室駅, Nemuro-eki) is a railway station in Nemuro, Hokkaido. The station is the eastern terminus of the Nemuro Main Line and the easternmost railway station in Japan.

== Layout ==
Nemuro Station has a single side platform.

=== Platforms ===
| 1 | Nemuro Main Line | for Kushiro |

== Adjacent stations ==
| « | Service | » |
Nemuro Main Line
| Ochiishi | Rapid | Terminus |

== Bus service ==
The station serves as Nemuro's central bus terminal, with scheduled overnight service to Sapporo via Nakashibetsu, two or three daily services to Kushiro, and multiple daily services to Nakashibetsu Airport, as well as local bus routes. Sightseeing buses operate to Cape Nosappu during summer months.

== History ==
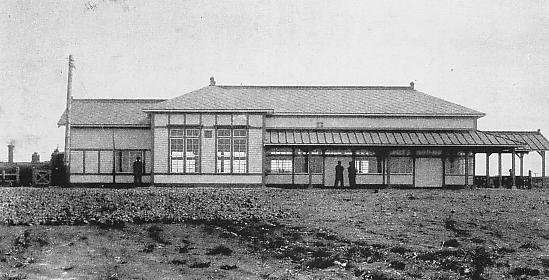
Nemuro Station in Taisho and Pre-war Showa eras (around 1930s)

The station opened on August 5, 1921. It has been the easternmost train station in Japan from 1921 to 1929, from 1959 to 1961, and from 2025. From 1929 to 1959, the easternmost station was on the Nemuro Takushoku Railway in Habomai on the Nemuro Peninsula. From 1961 to 2025, there was Higashi-Nemuro Station on the Nemuro Main Line's eastern approach to Nemuro.

== See also ==
- List of railway stations in Japan
