= Ochiai Station (Hokkaido) =

Railway station in Minamifurano, Hokkaido, Japan

Ochiai Station 落合駅
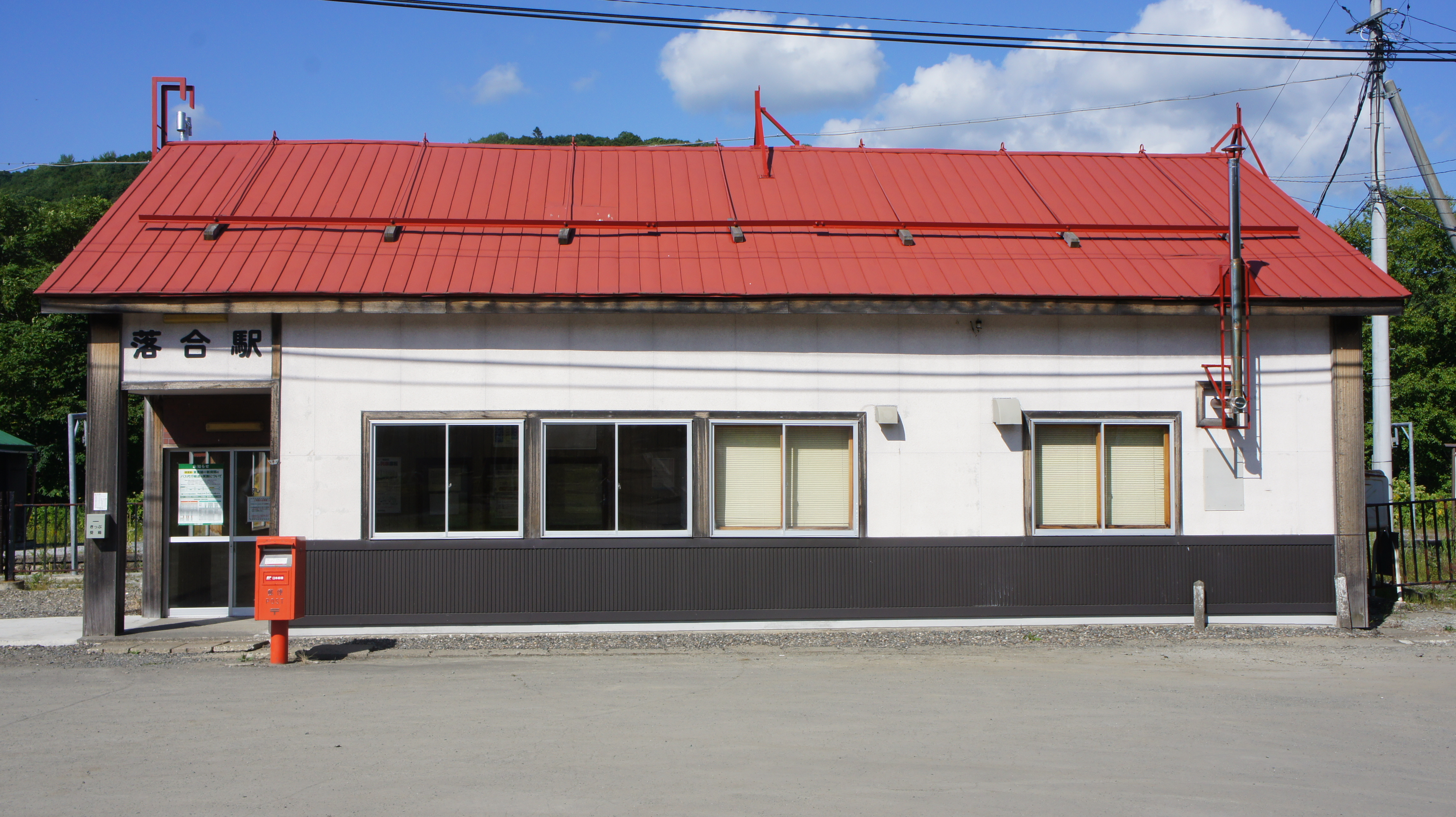

General information
- Location: Minamifurano, Sorachi, Hokkaido; Japan
- Coordinates: 43°7′30″N 142°40′8″E
- Operator: JR Hokkaido
- Line: Nemuro Main Line

Other information
- Station code: T37

History
- Opened: 3 September 1901
- Closed: 1 April 2024
Location

Ochiai Station (落合駅, Ochiai eki) was a railway station on the Nemuro Main Line, operated by Hokkaido Railway Company (JR Hokkaido). It was located in Minamifurano, Hokkaido, Japan, and was numbered T37. The elevation was 413 meters (AMSL).

== Line ==
- JR Hokkaido
  - Nemuro Main Line

== Station structure ==
The station had two platforms serving three tracks.

== History ==
The station opened on 3 September 1901.

In 2016, the section of the Nemuro Main Line between Shintoku and Higashi-Shikagoe suffered extensive damage due to heavy rainfall. Since then, a substitute bus service was put in place serving this section of the Nemuro Main Line. However, in 2024 it was decided that this station, along with the rest of the Nemuro Main Line between Furano and Shintoku, would be closed permanently effective 1 April of that year.

== Surrounding area ==
There were Karikachi signal stop, Karikachi tunnel and Niinai Station between this station and Shintoku Station. In 1966 the old line was replaced by new line through Shin-Karikachi tunnel.

=== Karikachi signal stop ===
Karikachi signal stop (狩勝信号場, Karikachi shingōjō) was located near the west mouth of ( old )Karikachi tunnel. It had zig zag. 43°8′17″N 142°45′17″E

=== Karikachi tunnel ===
Kaikachi tunnel (狩勝トンネル, Karikachi tonneru) was 654m long and 534m high (AMSL) at the highest point. 43°8′7″N 142°45′43″E

=== Niinai Station ===
Niinai station (新内駅, Niinai eki) was located in the middle of the eastern slope. 43°9′33″N 142°48′54″E

== Adjacent stations ==
Hokkaido Railway Company
Nemuro Main Line

Ikutora T36 – Ochiai T37 – Shintoku K23
