= Kami-Atsunai Station =

Former railway station in Urahoro, Hokkaido, Japan

Coordinates: 42.8321°N 143.7496°E

Kami-Atsunai Station 上厚内駅
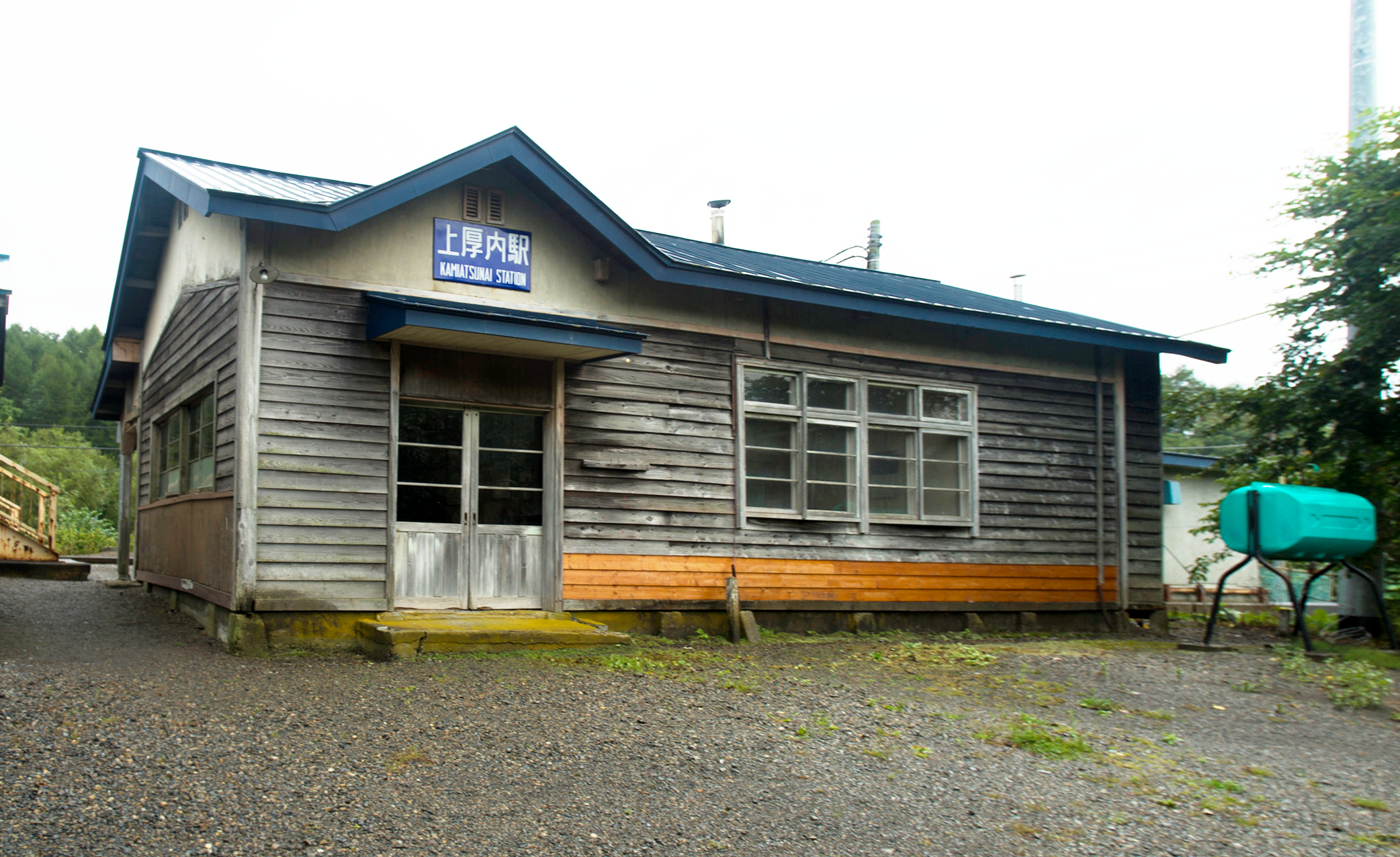
- The station in September 2013

General information
- Location: 184-1 Atsunai, Urahoro-chō, Tokachi-gun, Hokkaido; Japan
- Operator: JR Hokkaido
- Line: ■ Nemuro Line
- Distance: 243.5 km from Takikawa
- Platforms: 2 side platforms
- Tracks: 2

Other information
- Status: Closed
- Station code: K41

History
- Opened: 1 August 1926
- Closed: 3 March 2017
- Rebuilt: 1953
Location
- Location within Japan

Kami-Atsunai Station (上厚内駅, Kami-Atsunai-eki) was a railway station on the Nemuro Main Line in Urahoro, Hokkaido, Japan, operated by Hokkaido Railway Company (JR Hokkaido). Opened in 1926, it closed in March 2017.

== Lines ==
Kami-Atsunai Station was served by the Nemuro Main Line, and was situated 243.5 km from the starting point of the line at Takikawa. The station was numbered "K41".

== Layout ==
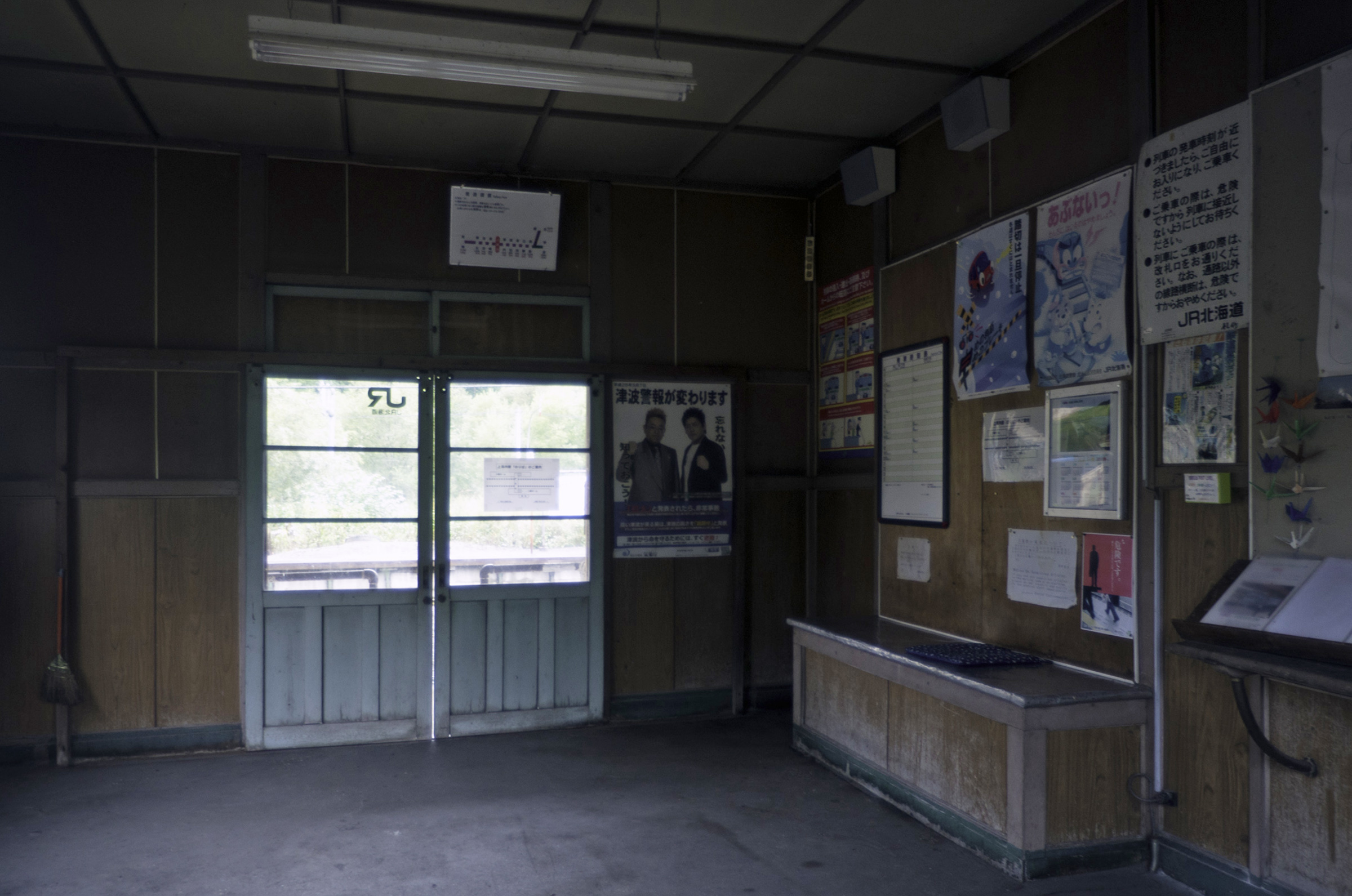
The waiting room in September 2013

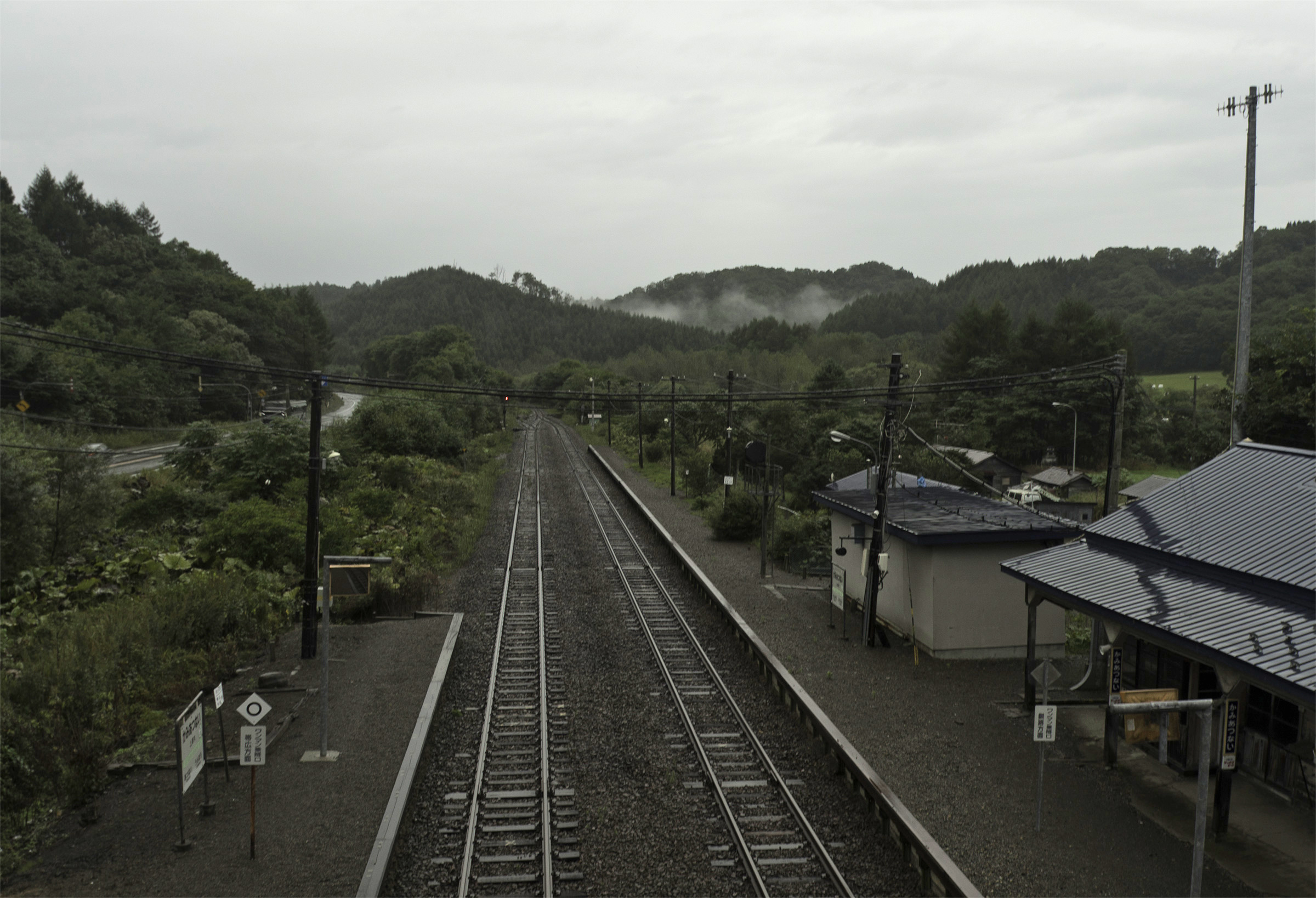
The platforms in September 2013

== Adjacent stations ==
«	Service	»
Nemuro Main Line
Limited Express Ōzora: Does not stop at this station
Urahoro	Local	Atsunai

== History ==
The station opened on 1 August 1926. A new wooden station structure was built in 1953.

With the privatization of Japanese National Railways (JNR) on 1 April 1987, the station came under the control of JR Hokkaido. The station was destaffed in 1992.

=== Closure ===
The station closed following the last day of services on 3 March 2017.

== See also ==
- List of railway stations in Japan
