= Shimo-Kanayama Station =

Railway station in Minamifurano, Hokkaido, Japan

Coordinates: 43°11′51″N 142°24′55″E

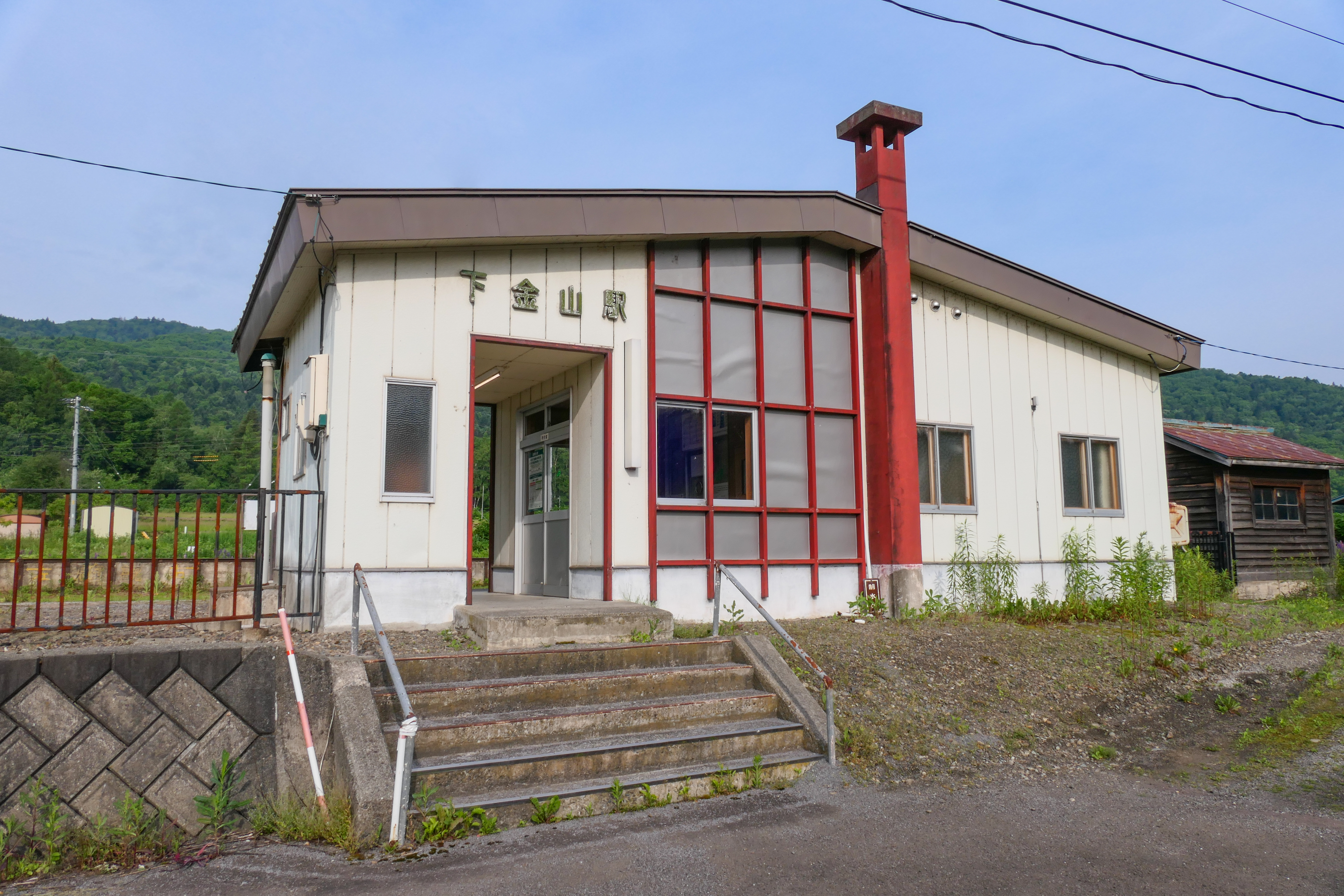
JR Nemuro Main Line Shimo-Kanayama Station building

Shimo-Kanayama Station (下金山駅, Shimo-Kanayama-eki) was a railway station on the Nemuro Main Line of JR Hokkaido located in Minamifurano, Hokkaidō, Japan. The station opened on October 1, 1913.

== Closure ==
In 2024, it was decided that this station, along with the rest of the Nemuro Main Line between Furano and Shintoku, would be closed permanently effective 1 April of that year.
