= Furuse Station =

Railway station in Shiranuka, Hokkaido, Japan

Coordinates: 42.9473°N 144.0077°E

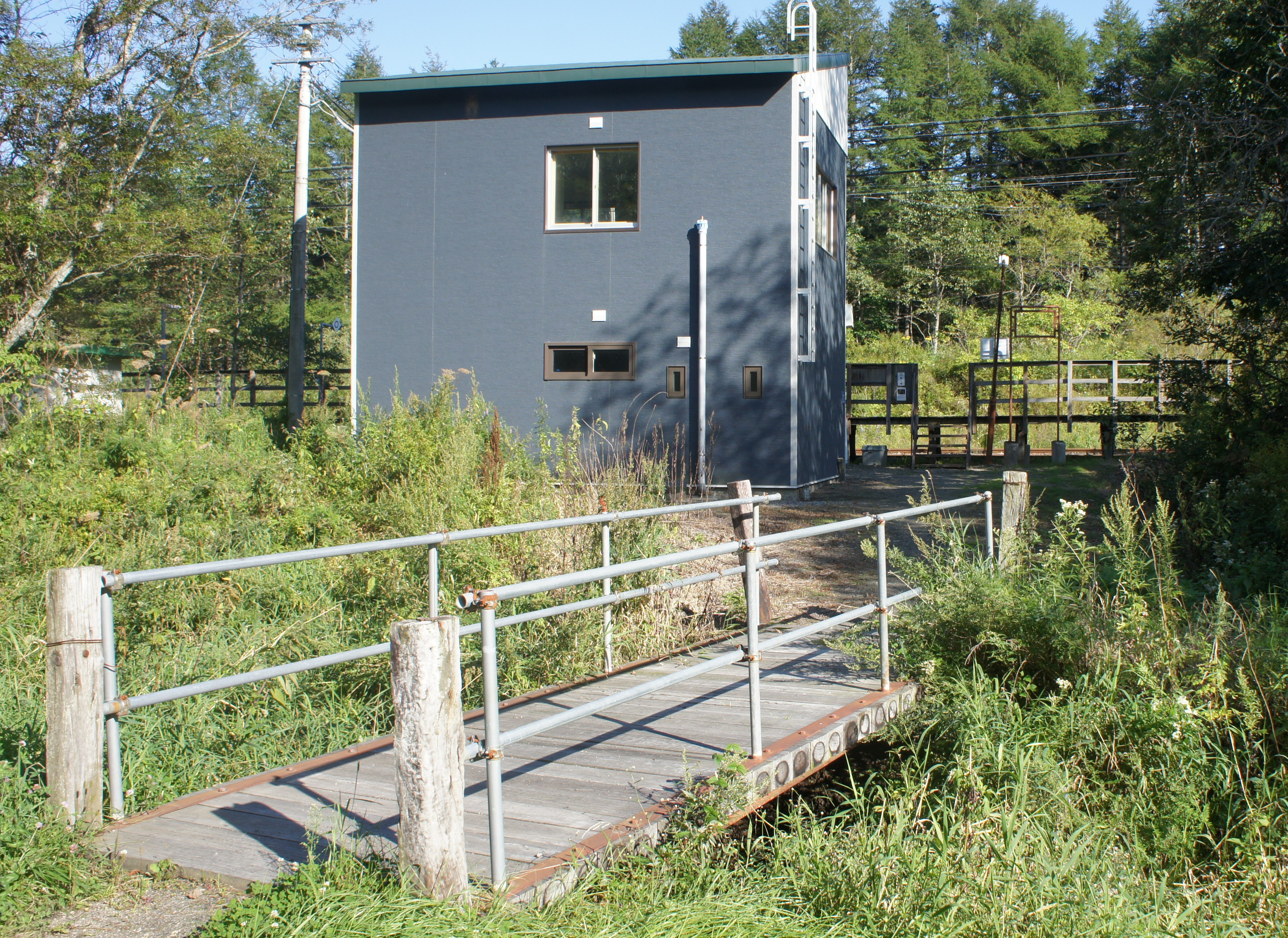
Furuse Station Platform 1 Gateway

Furuse Station (古瀬駅, Furuse-eki) was a train station in Shiranuka, Shiranuka District, Hokkaidō, Japan.

== Lines ==
- Hokkaido Railway Company
  - Nemuro Main Line Station K46

== Adjacent stations ==
«	Service	»
Nemuro Main Line
Limited Express Ōzora: Does not stop at this station
Onbetsu	Local	Shiranuka
