= Kanayama Station (Hokkaido) =

Railway station in Minamifurano, Hokkaido, Japan

Coordinates: 43°08′10″N 142°24′58″E

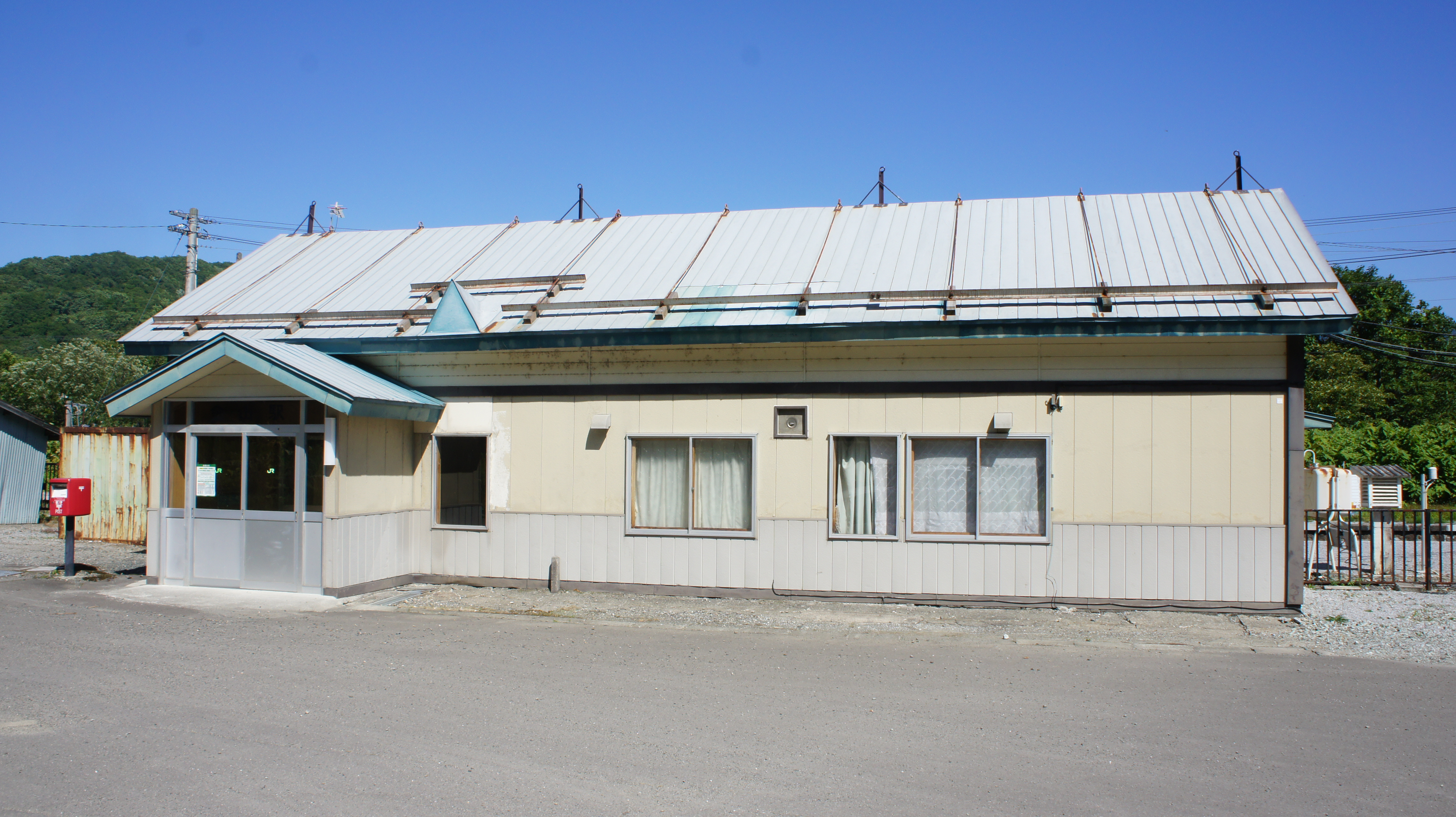
Kanayama station

Kanayama Station (金山駅, Kanayama-eki) was a railway station on the Nemuro Main Line of JR Hokkaido located in Minamifurano, Hokkaidō, Japan.

== Closure ==
In 2024 it was decided that this station, along with the rest of the Nemuro Main Line between Furano and Shintoku, would be closed permanently effective 1 April of that year.
