= Kaneyama =

Kaneyama may refer to:

- Kaneyama, Fukushima, a town in Fukushima Prefecture, Japan
- Kaneyama, Gifu, formerly a town in Gifu Prefecture, Japan
- Kaneyama, Yamagata, a town in Yamagata Prefecture, Japan
