= Higashi-Shikagoe Station =

Railway station in Minamifurano, Hokkaido, Japan

Coordinates: 43°09′50″N 142°31′25″E

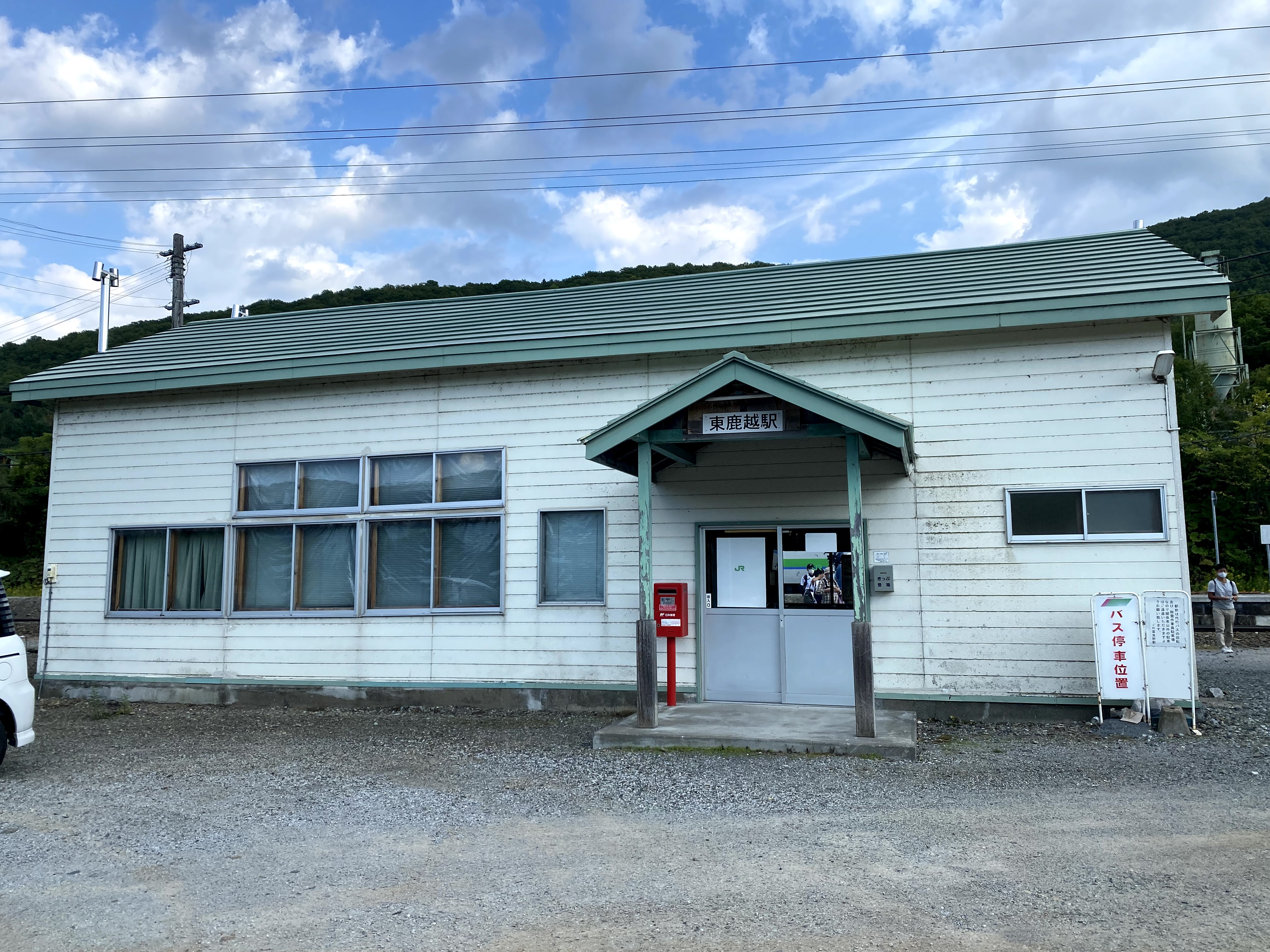
Station building

Higashi-Shikagoe Station (東鹿越駅, Higashi-Shikagoe-eki) was a railway station on the Nemuro Main Line of JR Hokkaido located in Minamifurano, Hokkaidō, Japan. The station opened on December 21, 1941, and was unstaffed.

== History ==
In 2016, the section of the Nemuro Main Line between Shintoku and Higashi-Shikagoe suffered extensive damage due to heavy rainfall. Since then, a substitute bus service was put in place serving this section of the Nemuro Main Line. However, in 2024, it was decided that this station, along with the rest of the Nemuro Main Line between Furano and Shintoku, would be closed permanently effective 1 April of that year.
