= Yamabe Station =

Railway station in Furano, Hokkaido, Japan

Coordinates: 43°14′41″N 142°22′53″E

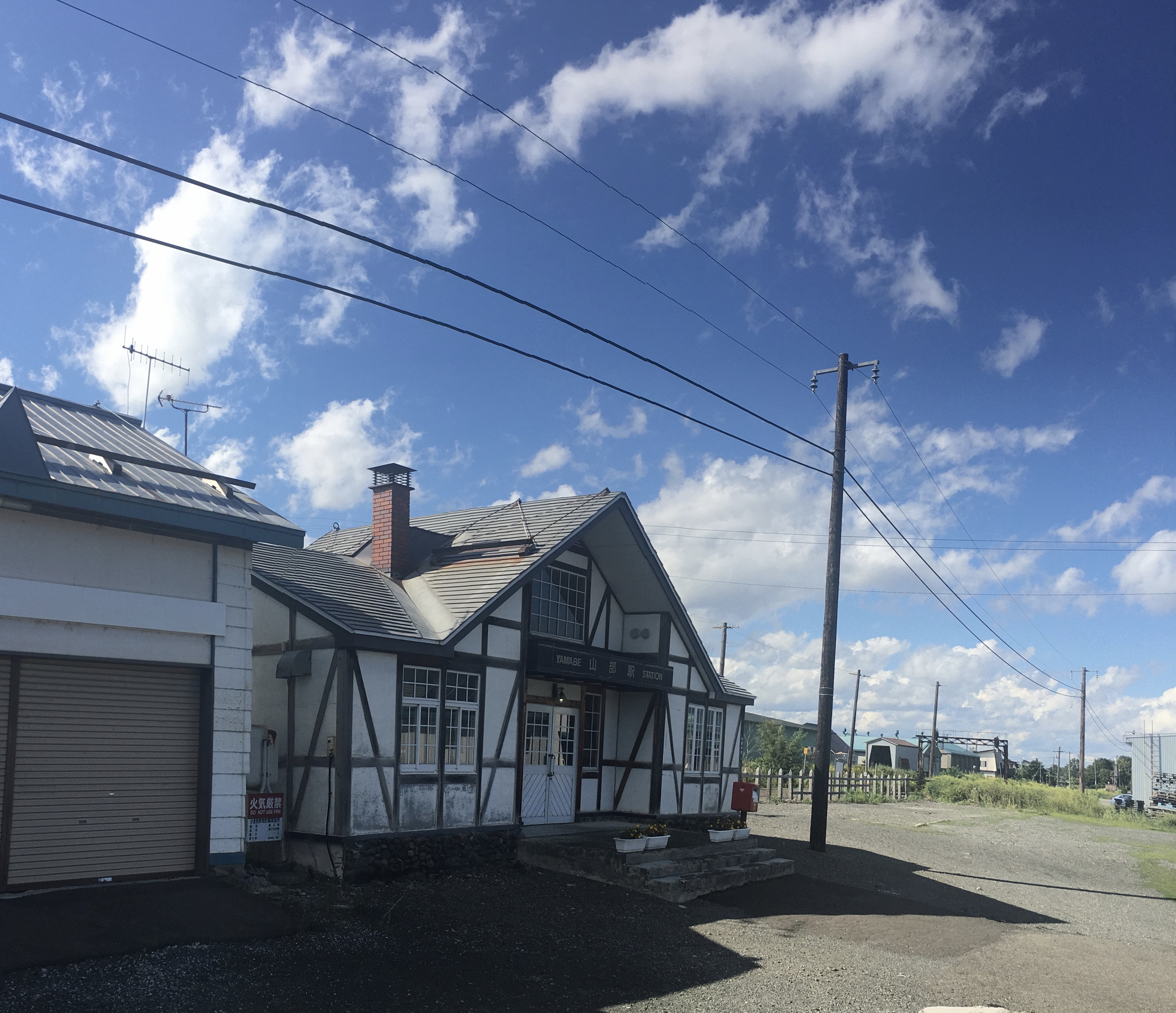
Yamabe Station, 2022

Yamabe Station (山部駅, Yamabe-eki) was a railway station of the JR Hokkaido Nemuro Main Line located in Furano, Hokkaidō, Japan. It opened on December 2, 1900.

== Closure ==
In 2024, it was decided that this station, along with the rest of the Nemuro Main Line between Furano and Shintoku, would be closed permanently effective 1 April of that year.
