= Takisato Dam =

Dam in Hokkaidō Prefecture, Japan

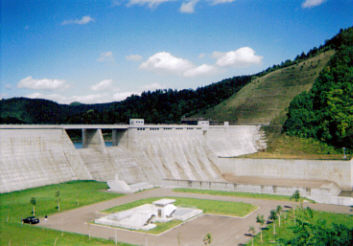
- Location: Hokkaidō, Japan.
- Coordinates: 43°26′37″N 142°17′17″E
- Construction began: 1979
- Opening date: 1999

Dam and spillways
- Impounds: Sorachi River
- Height: 50 m
- Length: 445 m

Reservoir
- Total capacity: 108,000,000 m^{3}
- Catchment area: 1,662.3 km^{2}
- Surface area: 680 hectares

The Takisato Dam is a dam on the Sorachi River in west central Hokkaidō, Japan.
