= Ochiishi Station =

Railway station in Nemuro, Hokkaido, Japan

Coordinates: 43°11′54″N 145°31′10″E

Ochiishi Station 落石駅
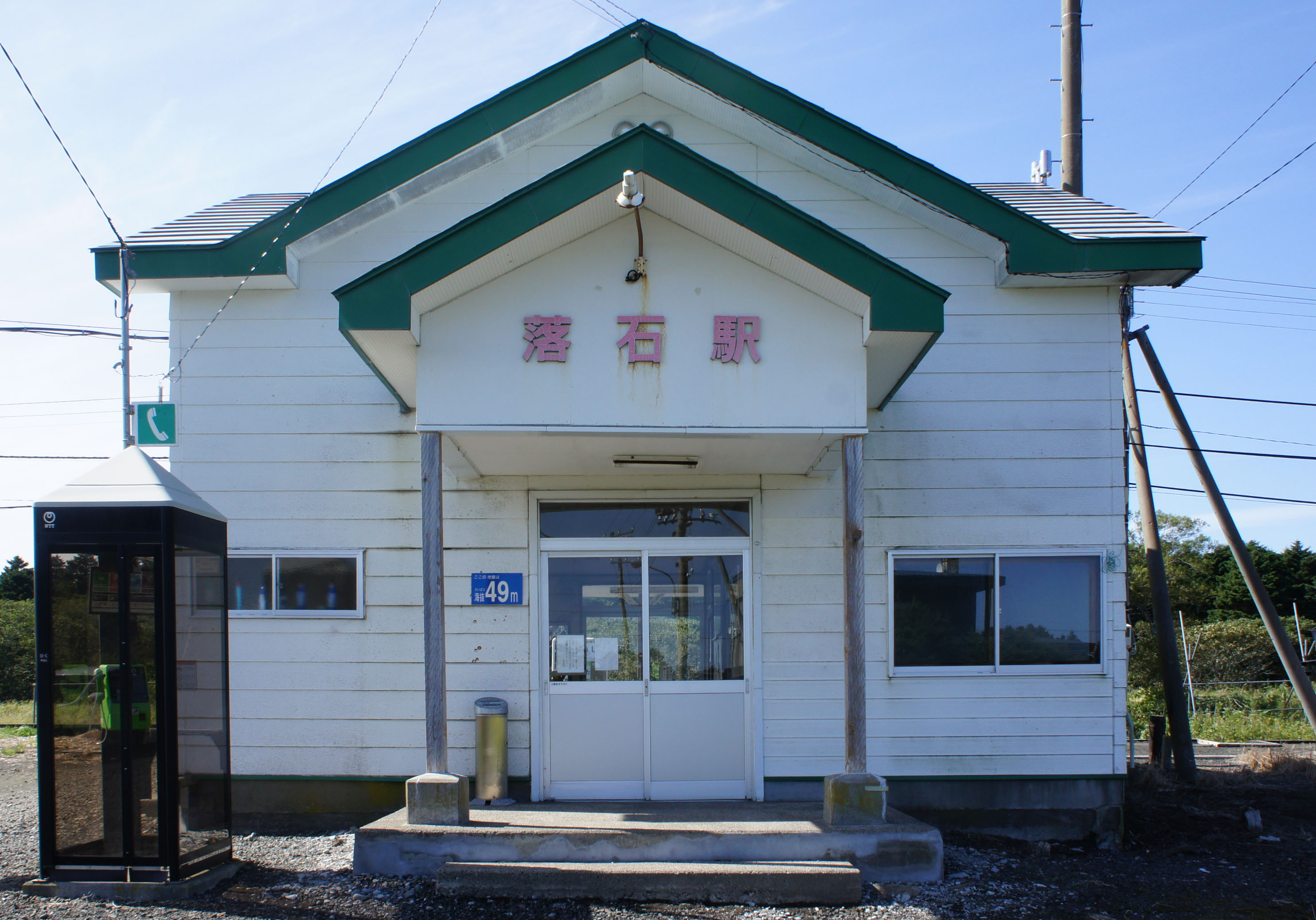
- Ochiishi Station (September 2018)

General information
- Location: Nemuro, Hokkaido; Japan
- Operator: Hokkaido Railway Company
- Line: ■ Nemuro Main Line
- Platforms: 1 Side platform
- Tracks: 1

Construction
- Structure type: At-grade
- Accessible: No

History
- Opened: 20 November 1920
Location
- Location within Japan

Ochiishi Station (落石駅, Ochiishi-eki) is a railway station on the Nemuro Main Line of JR Hokkaido located in Nemuro, Hokkaidō, Japan. The station opened on 10 November 1920.
