= Nishi-Wada Station =

Railway station in Nemuro, Hokkaido, Japan

Coordinates: 43°16′05″N 145°32′31″E

Nishi-Wada Station 上尾幌駅
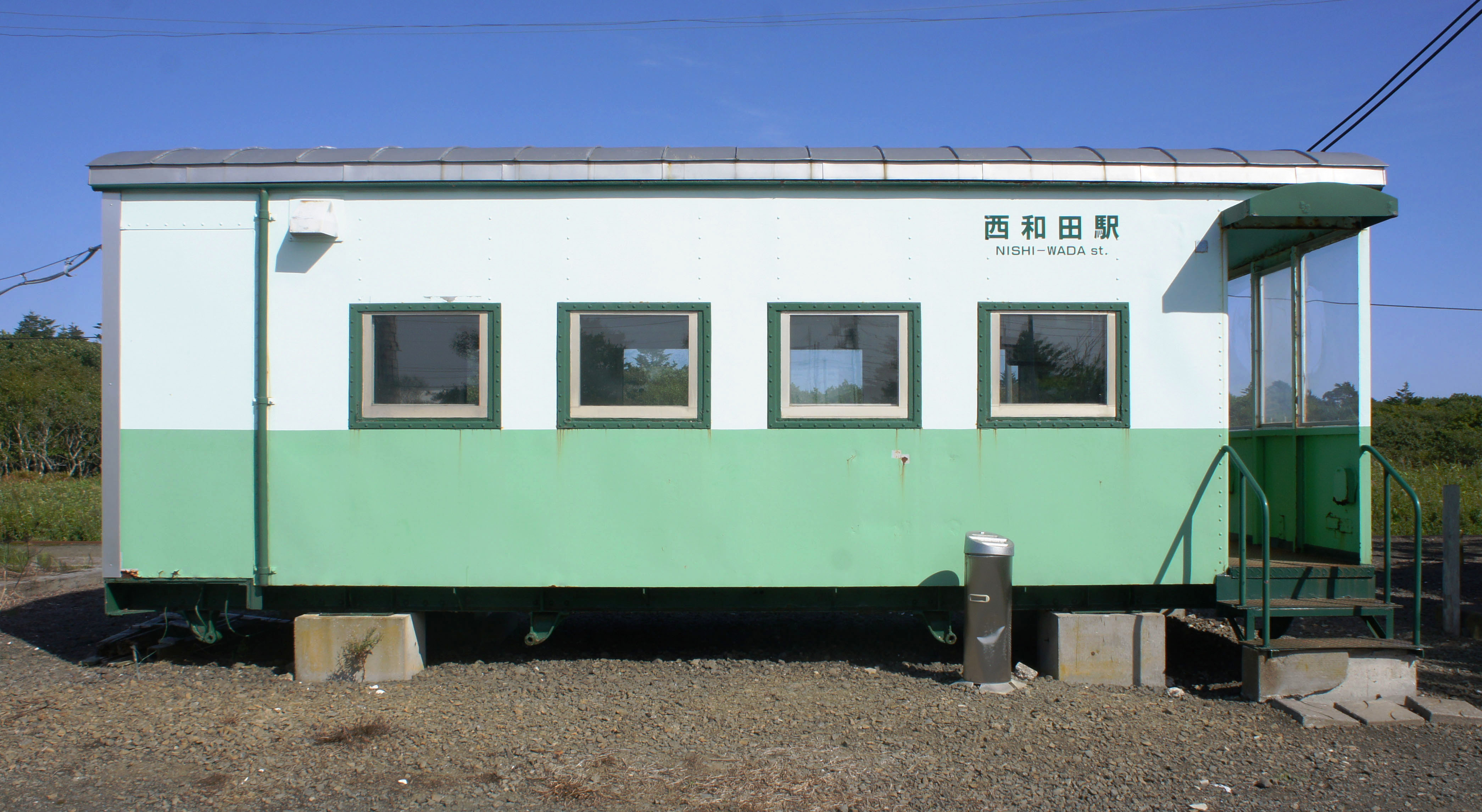
- The station building

General information
- Location: Akkeshi-chō, Hokkaido; Japan
- Operator: Hokkaido Railway Company
- Line: ■ Nemuro Main Line
- Platforms: 1 Side platform
- Tracks: 1

Construction
- Structure type: At-grade
- Accessible: No

History
- Opened: 10 November 1920
Location
- Location within Japan

Nishi-Wada Station (西和田駅, Nishi-wada-eki) is a railway station of the JR Hokkaido Nemuro Main Line located in Nemuro, Hokkaidō, Japan. The station opened on 10 November 1920.
