= K37 =

K37 may refer to:

- K-37 cipher machine; see Otto Buggisch
- HMS Veronica (K37), a corvette of the Royal Navy
- Junkers K 37, a German mail plane
- Piano Concerto No. 1 (Mozart), by Wolfgang Amadeus Mozart
- Potassium-37, an isotope of potassium
- Rio Grande class K-37, an American steam locomotive
- Tōfutsu Station, in Hokkaido, Japan
