= Ikeda Station (Hokkaido) =

Railway station in Ikeda, Hokkaido, Japan

K36 Ikeda Station 池田駅
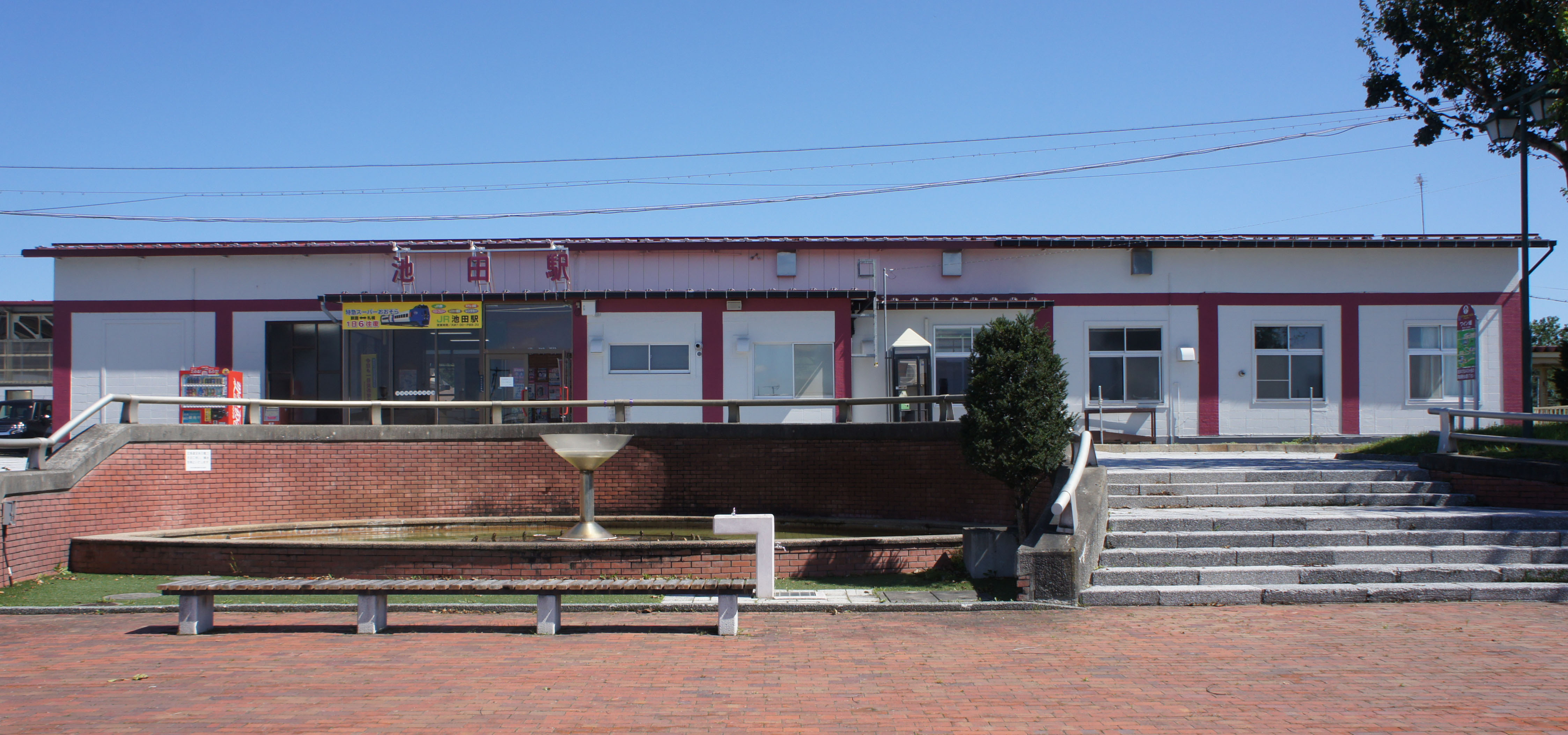
- Station building in September 2018

General information
- Location: Higashi 1 Jo, Ikeda, Nakagawa District, Hokkaido 083-0091; Japan
- Coordinates: 42°55′17.24″N 143°27′11.29″E
- System: regional rail
- Operator: JR Hokkaido
- Line: Nemuro Main Line
- Distance: 68.0km from Shintoku
- Platforms: 1 side + 1 island platforms
- Tracks: 3

Construction
- Structure type: At-grade
- Accessible: No

Other information
- Status: Staffed (Midori no Madoguchi )
- Station code: K36
- Website: Official website

History
- Opened: 15 December 1904; 121 years ago

Passengers
- FY2019: >470 daily

Services
Preceding station	JR Hokkaido	Following station
Toshibetsu towards Takikawa	Nemuro Main Line Local	Tōfutsu towards Nemuro
Location
- Location within Hokkaido Location within Japan

Ikeda Station (池田駅, Ikeda-eki) is a railway station located in the town of Ikeda, Nakagawa District, Hokkaidō, It is operated by JR Hokkaido.

== Lines ==
The station is served by the Nemuro Main Line, and lies 68.0 km from the starting point of the line at Shintoku.

== Layout ==
Ikeda station has one side platform and one island platform. Platform 1 is the main inbound line and Platform 2 is the main outbound line, but all three tracks are open to trains traveling in both directions. Express trains bound for Sapporo and Kushiro use Platform 1, located right outside the ticket gates, while local trains use all tracks regardless of direction. The platforms are connected by an overpass. Platform 3 is cut out halfway toward Takikawa, but this is the former site of Platform 4, which was used for the Furusato Ginga Line which was discontinued in April 2006. Platform 3 was also used primarily for through trains to the Nemuro Main Line. Until the Furusato Ginga Line was discontinued, Chihoku Highlands Railway had the Ikeda Operations Branch as its operations base, but no sales staff were stationed there.

Dedicated tracks were laid between the Taisho and early Showa periods to serve Fuji Paper, the Ikeda Warehouse, and thermal power plants. However, the only remaining tracks after the war were the Ikeda Warehouse Line and the newly established Japan Beet Sugar Receiving Line, which were also abolished by the mid-1950s.

The station building, rebuilt on January 3, 1961, has been renovated and is a single-story steel-framed building. This station is staffed and has a Midori no Madoguchi ticket office.

=== Platforms ===
1-3	■ Nemuro Main Line	for Sapporo and Shintoku for Urahoro and Kushiro

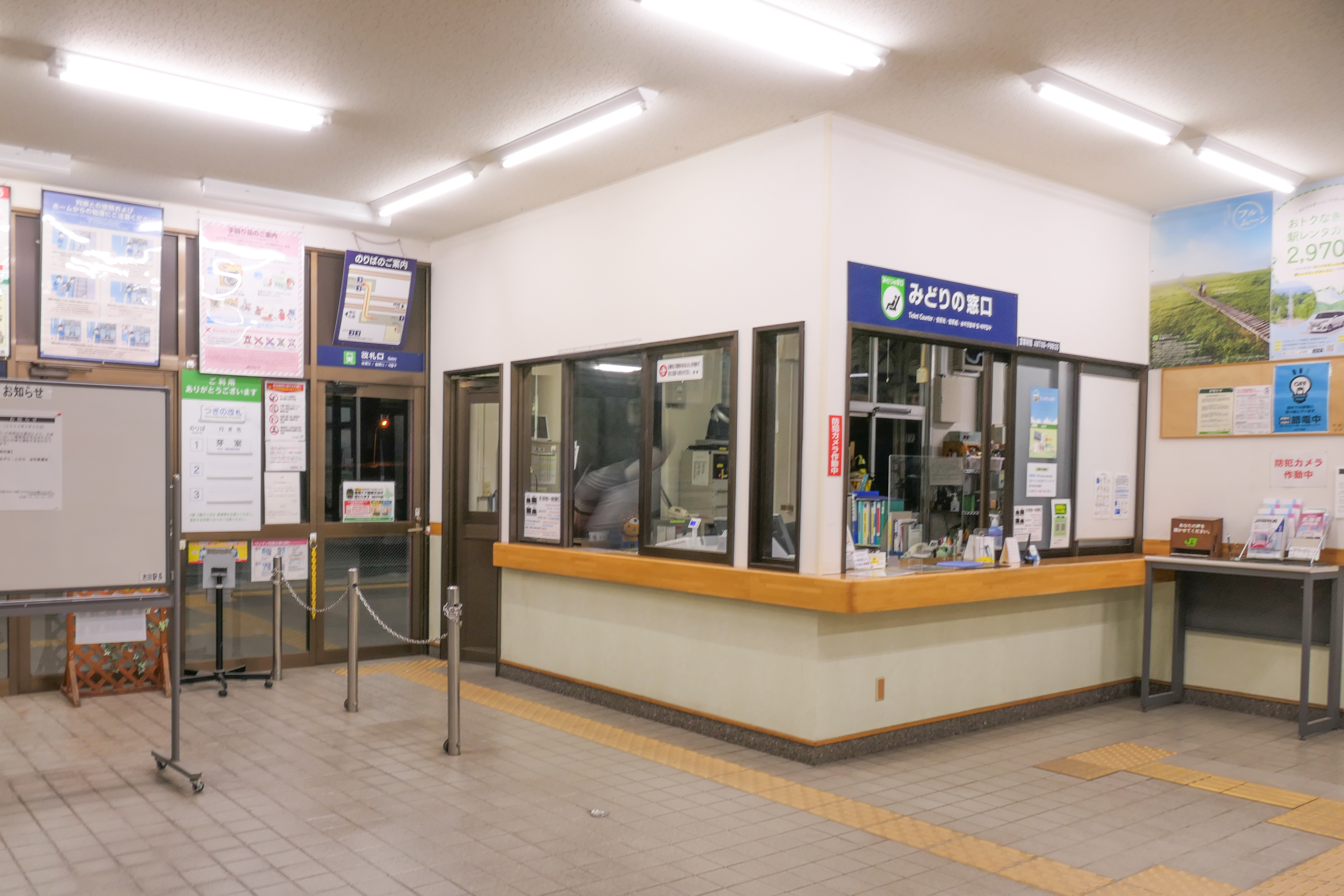
Ticket office

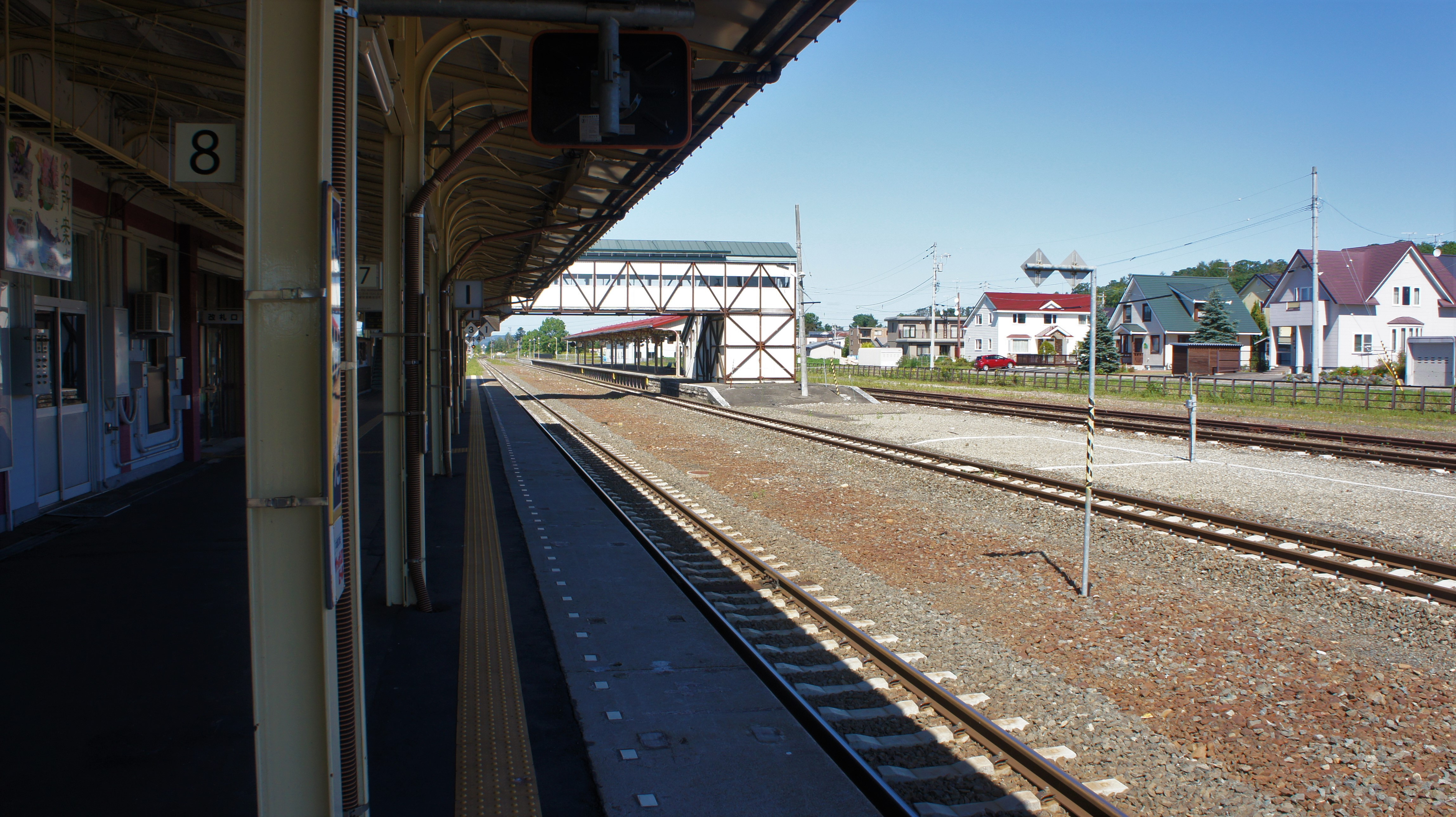
Platforms

== History ==
The station opened on 15 December 1904 as a station on the Hokkaido Government Railway, which was nationalized into the Japanese Government Railways of 1 April1905 On 22 September 1910, the Abashiri Line (later the Abashiri Main Line and Ikebetsu Line) opened. The station building was expanded and an overpass was installed. On 2 June 1913, the Ikeda Locomotive Depot was established. It was attacked in an air raid on 14 July 1945, killing two people. With the privatization of the Japan National Railway (JNR) on 1 April 1987, the station came under the aegis of the Hokkaido Railway Company (JR Hokkaido).

In 1989 the Hokkaido Chihoku Kogen Railway overtook operations of the former Chihoku Line and renamed it to the Furusato Ginga Line. The line was closed in 2006, relieving Ikeda Station as a terminus on the Furusato Ginga Line.

== Passenger statistics ==
In fiscal 2018, the station was used by under 470 passengers daily.。

== Surrounding area ==
Located in the center of Ikeda Town, it houses public facilities such as the town hall.

- Japan National Route 242
- Ikeda Town Town Hall
- Ikeda Town Grape and Wine Research Institute (Ikeda Wine Castle)

== See also ==
- List of railway stations in Japan
