= Furusato Ginga Line =

Former railway line in Hokkaidō, Japan

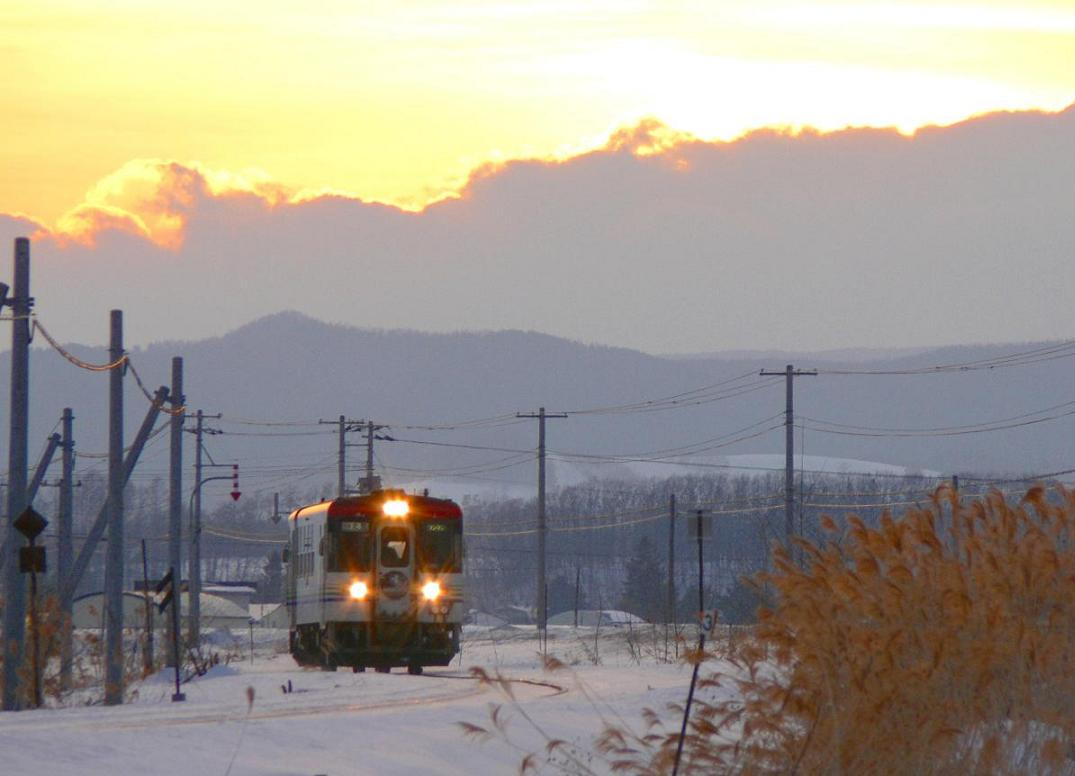
- Furusato Ginga Line CR70 series DMU; February 2006, near Nishitomi Station

Overview
- Status: Ceased operation
- Owner: Hokkaidō Chihoku Kōgen Railway
- Locale: Hokkaidō, Japan
- Termini: Ikeda; Kitami
- Stations: 33

Service
- Type: Heavy rail
- Operator(s): Hokkaidō Chihoku Kōgen Railway
- Rolling stock: CR70 series DMU, CR75 series DMU

History
- Opened: September 22, 1910
- Closed: April 21, 2006

Technical
- Line length: 140.0 km (87.0 mi)
- Number of tracks: Single
- Character: Rural
- Track gauge: 1,067 mm (3 ft 6 in)
- Electrification: Not electrified
- Operating speed: 85 km/h (53 mph)
Route map

The Furusato Ginga Line (ふるさと銀河線, Furusato Ginga-sen) was a railway line operated by the third-sector Hokkaidō Chihoku Kōgen Railway Company in Hokkaidō, Japan. The 140 km (87 mi) line connected the municipalities of Ikeda and Kitami until its closure in 2006.

== History ==
The first segment of the line, originally called the Abashiri Line (網走線, Abashiri-sen) and operated by Japanese Government Railways, was opened on September 22, 1910, and ran for 77.4 km, connecting Ikeda and Rikunbetsu (later renamed to Rikubetsu). The line was then extended further north, and on September 25, 1911, the segment connecting Rikunbetsu and Nokkeushi (present-day Kitami) was opened. In 1912 the Abashiri Line was further extended to Abashiri, and the line was renamed the Abashiri Main Line (網走本線, Abashiri-honsen).

Once the Sekihoku Line was extended to Nokkeushi in 1932, traffic largely shifted to the shorter Sekihoku Line. On April 1, 1961, the section of the Abashiri Main Line from Ikeda to Kitami (renamed from Nokkeushi in 1942) was named the Chihoku Line (池北線, Chihoku-sen), and the rest of the Abashiri Main Line was absorbed into the Sekihoku Main Line. The name "Chihoku Line" was created from the on'yomi of each of the first characters for Ikeda (池田) and Kitami (北見).

In 1987 Japanese National Railways (JNR), the successor to Japanese Government Railways, was privatized and JR Hokkaido took over management of the line. However, on June 4, 1989, JR Hokkaido ceased operation of the Chihoku Line. Unlike all other lines shut down by JNR and JR Hokkaido, in the Chihoku Line's case a successor company was established by local governments and private investors. The new company, Hokkaidō Chihoku Kōgen Railway Company, renamed the Chihoku Line to the Furusato Ginga Line ("Hometown Galaxy Line") and introduced new cars. However 17 years later, the company came to the decision to close the line, which thus ceased operations on April 21, 2006.

== Stations ==
Station		Distance (km)	Connections	Location	
Ikeda	池田駅	0.0	JR Hokkaido: Nemuro Main Line	Ikeda	Hokkaidō
Samamai	様舞駅	5.7		Ikeda	Hokkaidō
Takashima	高島駅	11.5		Ikeda	Hokkaidō
Ōmori	大森駅	16.5		Ikeda	Hokkaidō
Yūtari	勇足駅	20.8		Honbetsu	Hokkaidō
Minami-Honbetsu	南本別駅	23.5		Honbetsu	Hokkaidō
Okamedō	岡女堂駅	27.3		Honbetsu	Hokkaidō
Honbetsu	本別駅	29.8		Honbetsu	Hokkaidō
Senbiri	仙美里駅	36.2		Honbetsu	Hokkaidō
Ashoro	足寄駅	44.6		Ashoro	Hokkaidō
Aikappu	愛冠駅	50.7		Ashoro	Hokkaidō
Nishiissen	西一線駅	54.0		Ashoro	Hokkaidō
Shiohoro	塩幌駅	55.9		Ashoro	Hokkaidō
Kamitoshibetsu	上利別駅	58.4		Ashoro	Hokkaidō
Sasamori	笹森駅	62.2		Ashoro	Hokkaidō
Oyochi	大誉地駅	66.5		Ashoro	Hokkaidō
Kunbetsu	薫別駅	70.7		Rikubetsu	Hokkaidō
Rikubetsu	陸別駅	77.4		Rikubetsu	Hokkaidō
Bunsen	分線駅	83.1		Rikubetsu	Hokkaidō
Kawakami	川上駅	87.2		Rikubetsu	Hokkaidō
Shōtoshibetsu	小利別駅	93.5		Rikubetsu	Hokkaidō
Oketo	置戸駅	109.4		Oketo	Hokkaidō
Toyozumi	豊住駅	113.8		Oketo	Hokkaidō
Sakaino	境野駅	116.6		Oketo	Hokkaidō
Nishi-Kunneppu	西訓子府駅	118.4		Kunneppu	Hokkaidō
Nishitomi	西富駅	121.4		Kunneppu	Hokkaidō
Kunneppu	訓子府駅	123.5		Kunneppu	Hokkaidō
Honami	穂波駅	125.3		Kunneppu	Hokkaidō
Hinode	日ノ出駅	127.4		Kunneppu	Hokkaidō
Hirosato	広郷駅	129.4		Kitami	Hokkaidō
Kami-Tokoro	上常呂駅	132.2		Kitami	Hokkaidō
Hokkōsha	北光社駅	135.5		Kitami	Hokkaidō
Kitami	北見駅	140.0	JR Hokkaido: Sekihoku Main Line	Kitami	Hokkaidō
