= Toyokoro, Hokkaido =

Town in Japan

Toyokoro 豊頃町 Toyokoro-chō
- Town
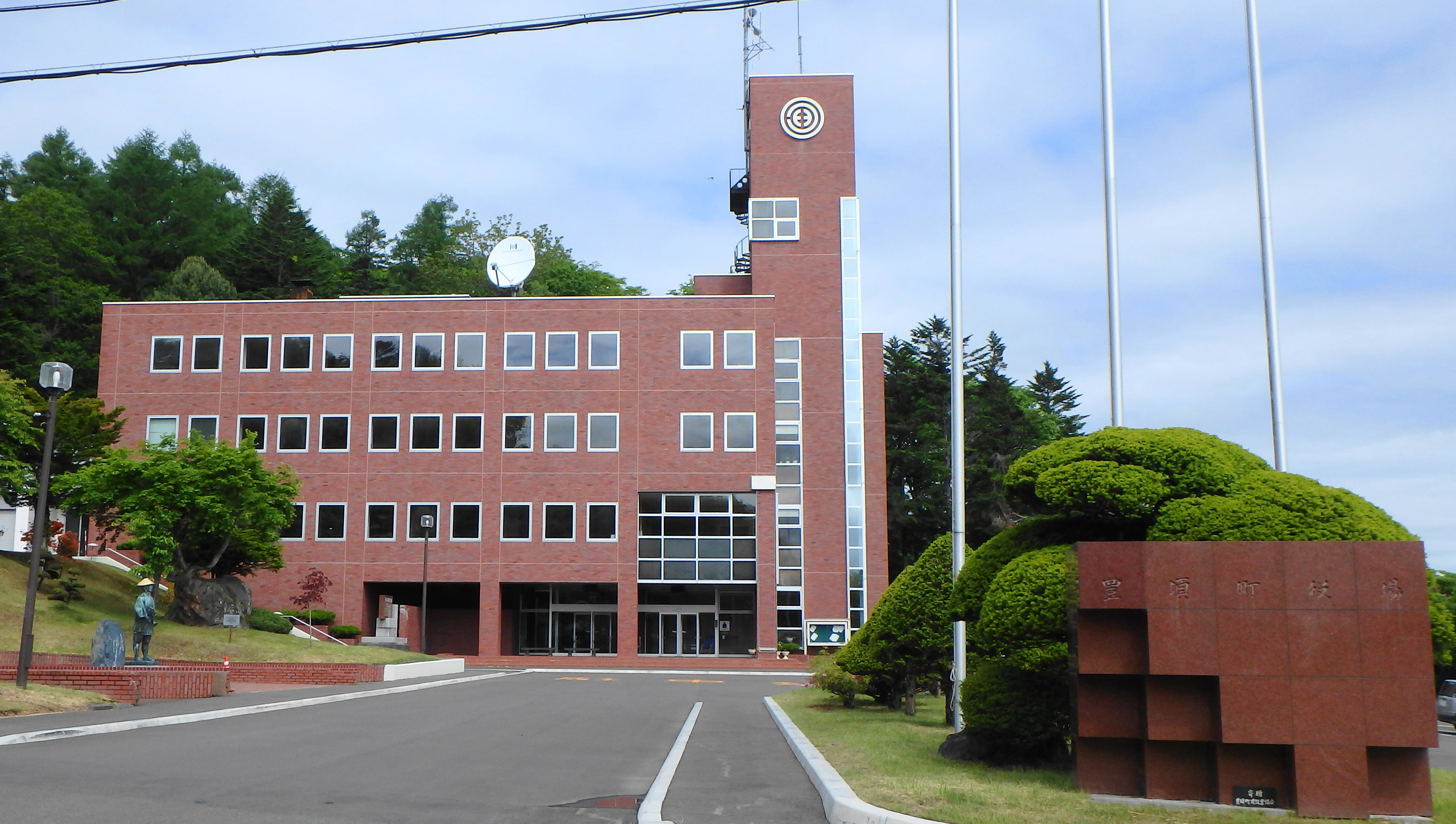
- Toyokoro Town Hall

- Flag Emblem

- Location of Toyokoro in Hokkaido (Tokachi Subprefecture)
- Interactive map of Toyokoro
- Coordinates: 42°48′04″N 143°30′21″E
- Country: Japan
- Region: Hokkaido
- Prefecture: Hokkaido (Tokachi Subprefecture)
- District: Nakagawa (Tokachi)

Area
  - Total: 536.71 km^{2} (207.22 sq mi)

Population (December 31, 2025)
  - Total: 2,784
  - Density: 5.187/km^{2} (13.43/sq mi)
- Time zone: UTC+09:00 (JST)
- City hall address: 125 Moiwahonmachi, Toyokoro-cho, Nakagawa-gun, Hokkaido 089-5392
- Climate: Dfb
- Website: www.toyokoro.jp
- Symbols
- Flower: Ezo Rhododendron
- Tree: Elm

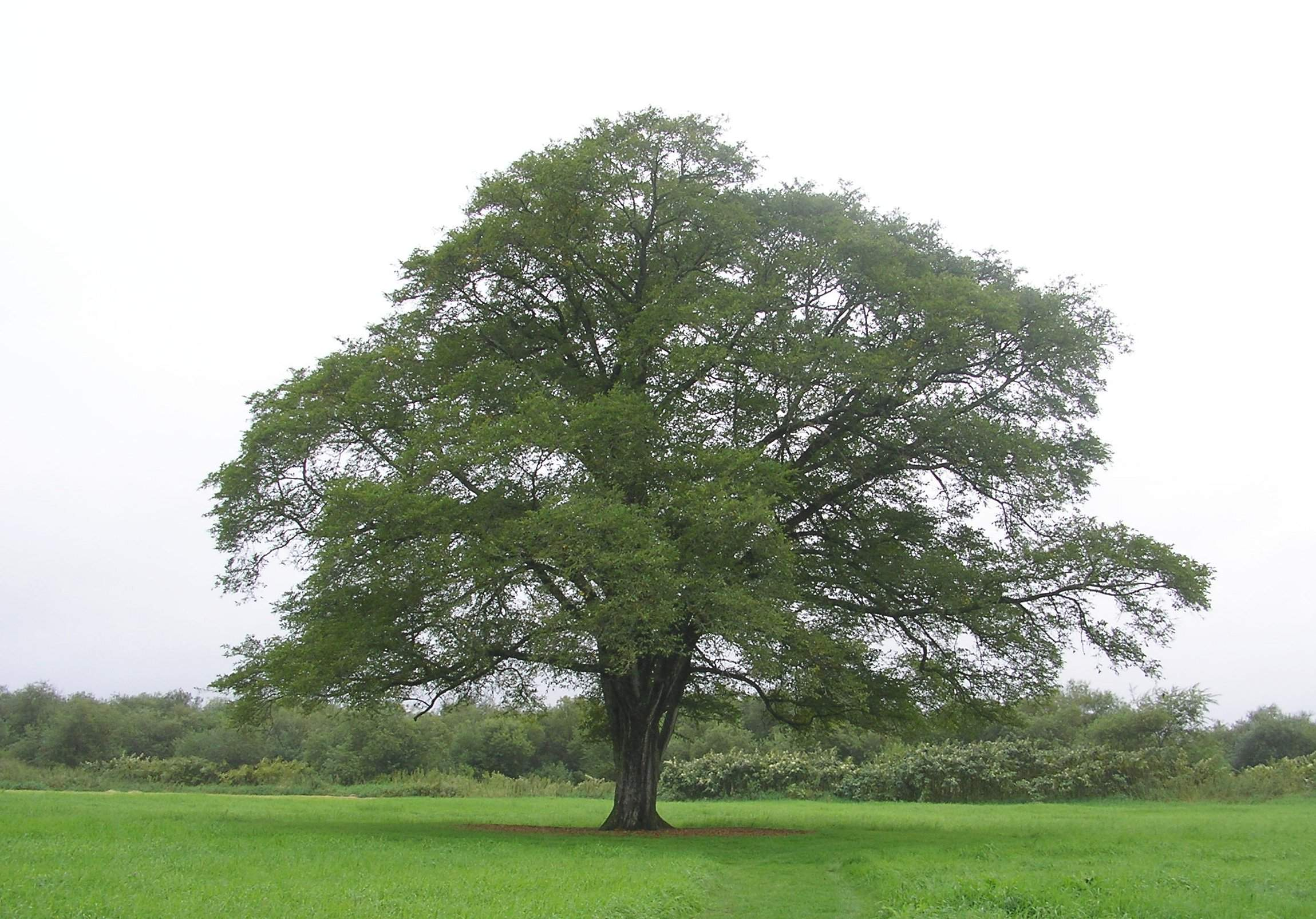
Harunire Tree

Toyokoro (豊頃町, Toyokoro-chō) is a town located in Tokachi Subprefecture, Hokkaidō, Japan. As of 31 December 2025, the town had an estimated population of 2,784 in 1435 households, and a population density of 5 people per km^{2}. The total area of the town is 536.71 km^{2} (207.22 sq mi).

== Geography ==
Toyokoro is located in southeastern Hokkaido in the eastern part of the Tokachi Subprefecture, it faces the Pacific Ocean ro the south. The Tokachi River basin and the Pacific coast are flat, while the rest of the area is hilly. The coast is known for the phenomenon known as "jewelry ice," in which transparent chunks of ice appear on the sandy beach during the coldest months of the year. The urban area consists of two areas, Toyokoro and Moiwa, separated by the Tokachi River and connected by Toyokoro Ohashi Bridge and Moiwa Bridge.

=== Neighboring municipalities ===
  - Taiki
  - Urahoro
  - Makubetsu
  - Ikeda

=== Climate ===
According to the Köppen climate classification, Toyokoro has a humid continental climate. It has large temperature differences, including large annual and daily temperature ranges. It receives a lot of snow, and is designated as a heavy snow area. In winter, temperatures below -20 °C are not uncommon, making it extremely cold.

Climate data for 大津（1991 - 2020）
Month	Jan	Feb	Mar	Apr	May	Jun	Jul	Aug	Sep	Oct	Nov	Dec	Year
Record high °C (°F)	7.6 (45.7)	11.5 (52.7)	15.9 (60.6)	31.9 (89.4)	31.3 (88.3)	34.5 (94.1)	36.9 (98.4)	34.6 (94.3)	31.4 (88.5)	25.1 (77.2)	20.4 (68.7)	13.4 (56.1)	36.9 (98.4)
Mean daily maximum °C (°F)	−1.1 (30.0)	−0.4 (31.3)	3.3 (37.9)	8.9 (48.0)	12.9 (55.2)	15.6 (60.1)	19.5 (67.1)	21.6 (70.9)	20.2 (68.4)	15.4 (59.7)	8.9 (48.0)	1.5 (34.7)	10.5 (50.9)
Daily mean °C (°F)	−7.4 (18.7)	−6.4 (20.5)	−1.2 (29.8)	4.1 (39.4)	8.5 (47.3)	12.1 (53.8)	16.1 (61.0)	18.1 (64.6)	15.9 (60.6)	9.9 (49.8)	3.2 (37.8)	−4.2 (24.4)	5.7 (42.3)
Mean daily minimum °C (°F)	−13.9 (7.0)	−13.2 (8.2)	−6.4 (20.5)	−0.4 (31.3)	4.6 (40.3)	9.2 (48.6)	13.6 (56.5)	15.4 (59.7)	12.0 (53.6)	4.5 (40.1)	−2.2 (28.0)	−9.8 (14.4)	1.1 (34.0)
Record low °C (°F)	−26.6 (−15.9)	−27.7 (−17.9)	−22.1 (−7.8)	−10.7 (12.7)	−3.7 (25.3)	0.3 (32.5)	6.4 (43.5)	7.2 (45.0)	1.1 (34.0)	−5.4 (22.3)	−13.7 (7.3)	−21.5 (−6.7)	−27.7 (−17.9)
Average precipitation mm (inches)	42.2 (1.66)	28.5 (1.12)	47.3 (1.86)	73.4 (2.89)	107.6 (4.24)	103.8 (4.09)	123.9 (4.88)	145.7 (5.74)	165.5 (6.52)	114.4 (4.50)	61.3 (2.41)	53.7 (2.11)	1,076 (42.36)
Average precipitation days (≥ 1.0 mm)	5.2	4.4	5.8	7.8	9.5	8.4	10.4	10.7	10.3	8.4	7.7	5.9	95.1
Mean monthly sunshine hours	192.9	188.6	213.4	182.6	174.1	123.3	110.3	121.3	145.0	174.1	173.0	179.6	1,981.4

=== Demographics ===
Per Japanese census data, the population of Toyokoro has declined in recent decades.

Historical population
Year	Pop.	±%
1970	7,386	—
1980	5,779	−21.8%
1990	5,050	−12.6%
2000	4,164	−17.5%
2010	3,394	−18.5%
2020	3,022	−11.0%

== History ==
Beginning around 1798, guardhouses and trading were established in the Otsu area by Matsumae Domain for trade with the Ainu people. Following the Meiji restoration, a headsman's office was established in Otsu. Ninomiya Takachika (grandson of Ninomiya Sontoku) moved to Otsu in 1896. Toyokoro separated from Otsu in 1899 and merged with Chashikocha Village on April 1, 1906, forming the second-class village of Toyokoro. It was raised to town status on January 1, 1955.

== Government ==
Toyokoro has a mayor-council form of government with a directly elected mayor and a unicameral town council of nine members. Toyokoro, as part of Tokachi Subprefecture, contributes four members to the Hokkaidō Prefectural Assembly. In terms of national politics, the town is part of the Hokkaidō 11th district of the lower house of the Diet of Japan.

== Economy ==
Agriculture (field crops), dairy farming, and commercial fishing are the basis of the local economy. Field crops include potatoes, sugar beets, wheat, beans, and radishes. The fishing industry, based at Otsu Fishing Port, produces salmon, crab, surf clams, and shishamo.

== Education ==
Toyokoro has one public elementary school and one public middle school operated by the town. The town does not have a high school.

== Transportation ==
=== Railways ===
JR Hokkaido - Nemuro Main Line

■ Tōfutsu - Toyokoro

=== Highways ===
- National Route 38
- National Route 336

== Sister city relations ==
- Namerikawa, Toyama, Japan
- Sōma, Fukushima, Japan
- Summerland, British Columbia, Canada

== Local attractions ==
- The town is famous for the Harunire Tree, which is two Japanese elm trees that are fused together to look like one.
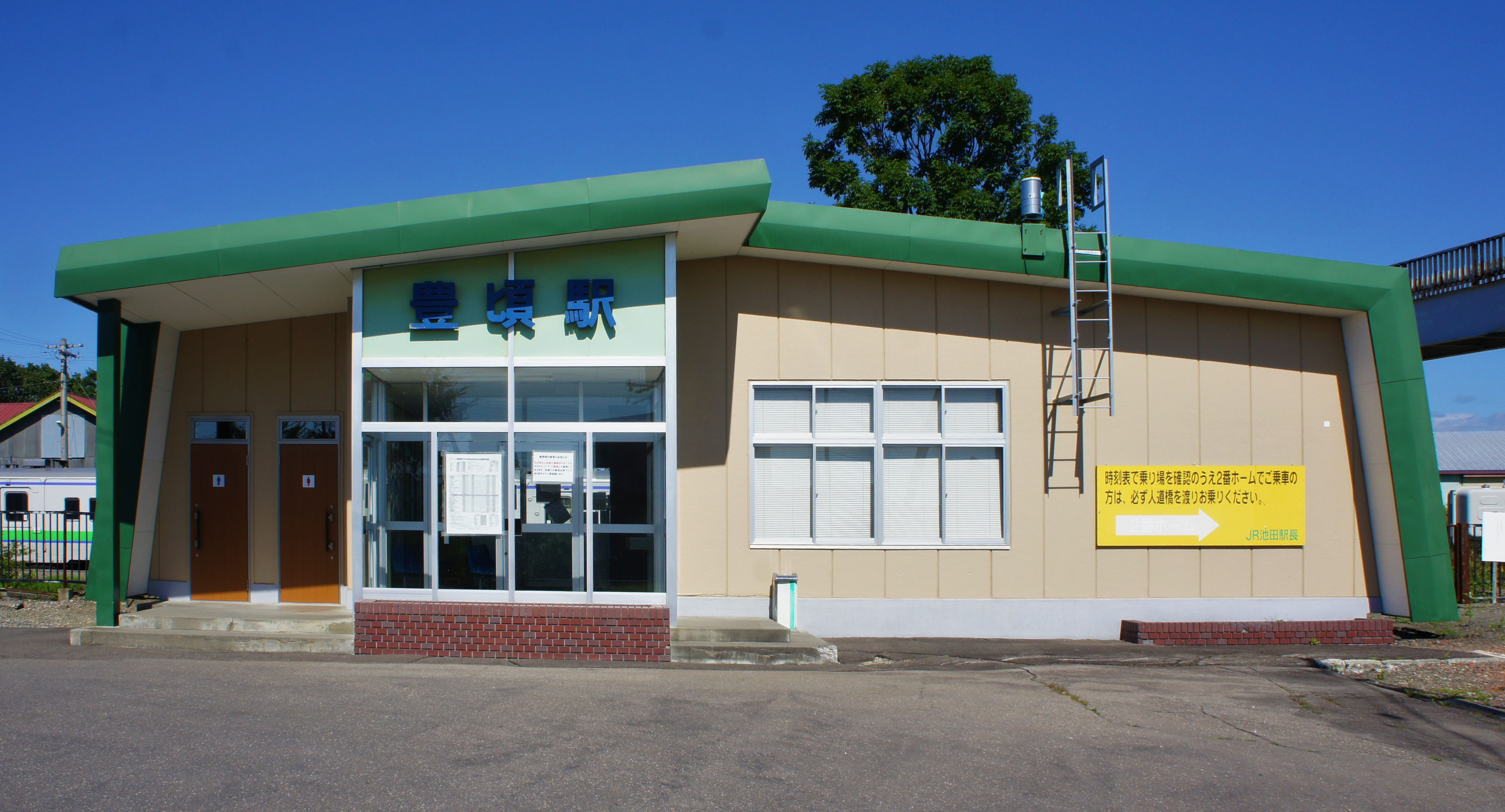
Toyokoro railway station

Tokachi River and Toyokoro Bridge

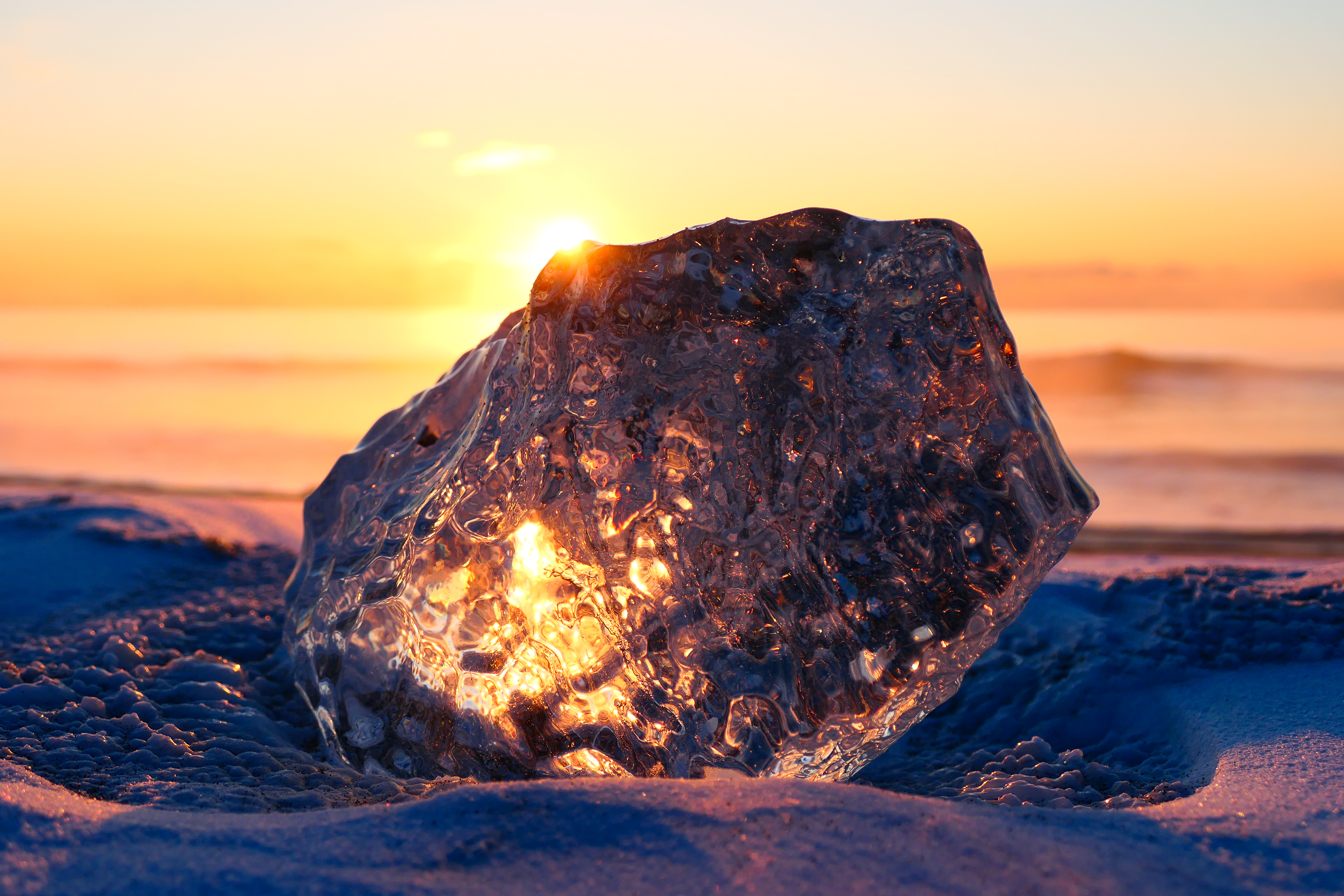
Jewelry Ice

Main Street in Toyokoro

Reidential area

== Mascot ==
Eru-kun and Yume-chan, the town's mascots

Toyokoro's mascots are Eru-kun (えるくん) and Yume-chan (夢ちゃん). They are based on the Harunire Tree. As they are tree fairies, they can live over 140 years (according to legend) and can talk to the wind. Their goal is to teach the importance of cooperative friendship. Their weakness is loneliness. Eru-kun likes salmon rice balls, waffles and hot milk while Dream-chan likes potato dumplings, soft serve ice cream and an-doughnuts.
