= Toyokoro Station =

Railway station in Toyokoro, Hokkaido, Japan

K38 Toyokoro Station 豊頃駅
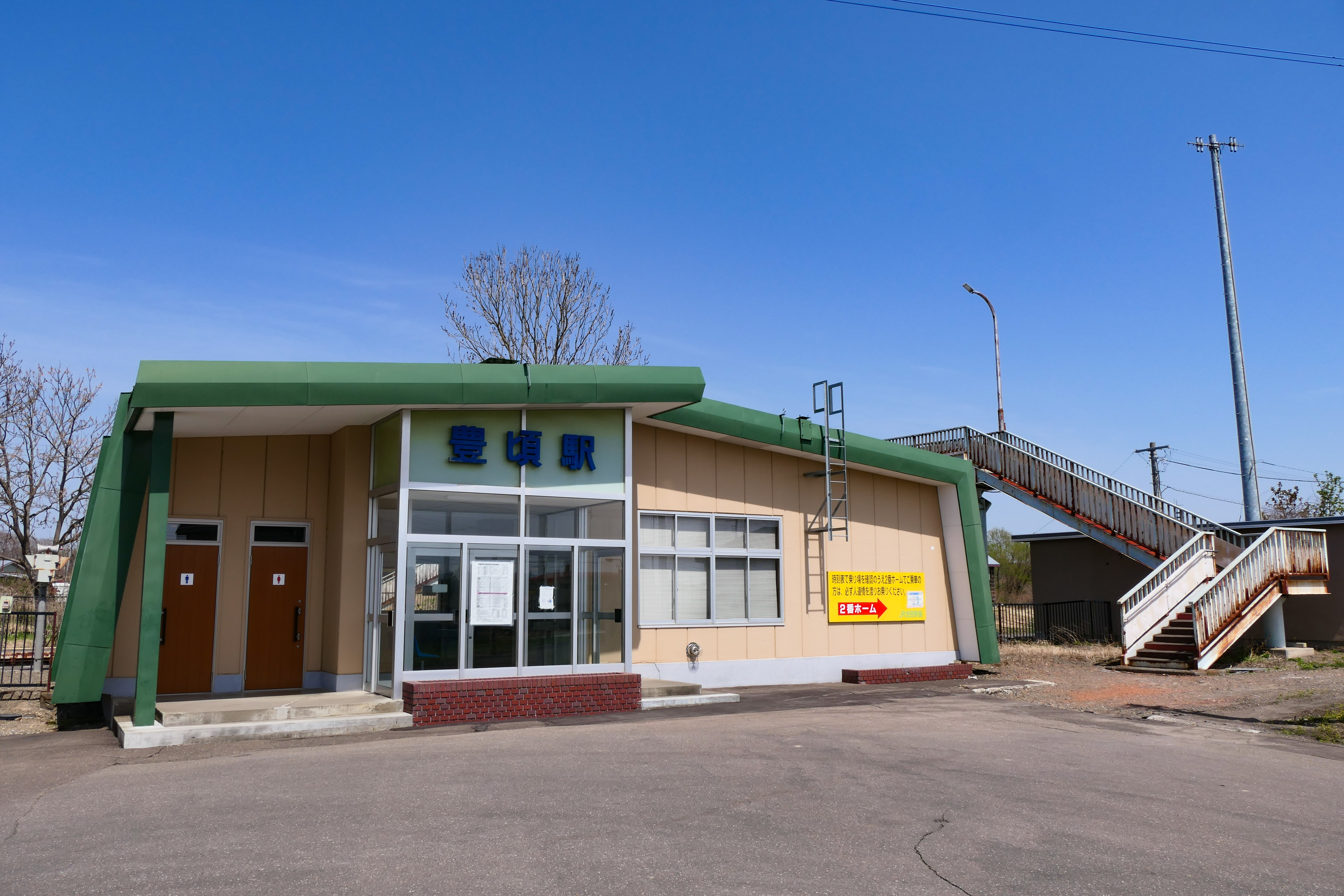
- Station building in May 2021

General information
- Location: Toyokoroasahimachi, Toyokoro, Nakagawa District, Hokkaido 089-5232; Japan
- Coordinates: 42°49′3.12″N 143°32′19.1″E
- System: regional rail
- Operator: JR Hokkaido
- Line: Nemuro Main Line
- Distance: 81.9km from Shintoku
- Platforms: 2 side platforms
- Tracks: 2

Construction
- Structure type: At-grade
- Accessible: No

Other information
- Status: Unstaffed
- Station code: K38
- Website: Official website

History
- Opened: 12 August 1904; 122 years ago

Passengers
- FY2024: >10 daily

Services
Preceding station	JR Hokkaido	Following station
Tōfutsu towards Takikawa	Nemuro Main Line Local	Shin-Yoshino towards Nemuro
Location
- Location within Hokkaido Location within Japan

Toyokoro Station (豊頃駅, Toyokoro-eki) is a railway station located in the town of Toyokoro, Nakagawa District, Hokkaidō, It is operated by JR Hokkaido.

== Lines ==
The station is served by the Nemuro Main Line, and lies 81.9 km from the starting point of the line at Shintoku.

== Layout ==
Toyokoro station has two opposing side platforms and two tracks. Platform 1, the main track adjacent to the station building, is generally used for both inbound and outbound trains, with platform 2 only used when trains need to switch. The two platforms are connected by an open-air footbridge. The station building is unattended.

=== Platforms ===
1	■ Nemuro Main Line	for Obihiro and Shintoku
2	■ Nemuro Main Line	for Kushiro

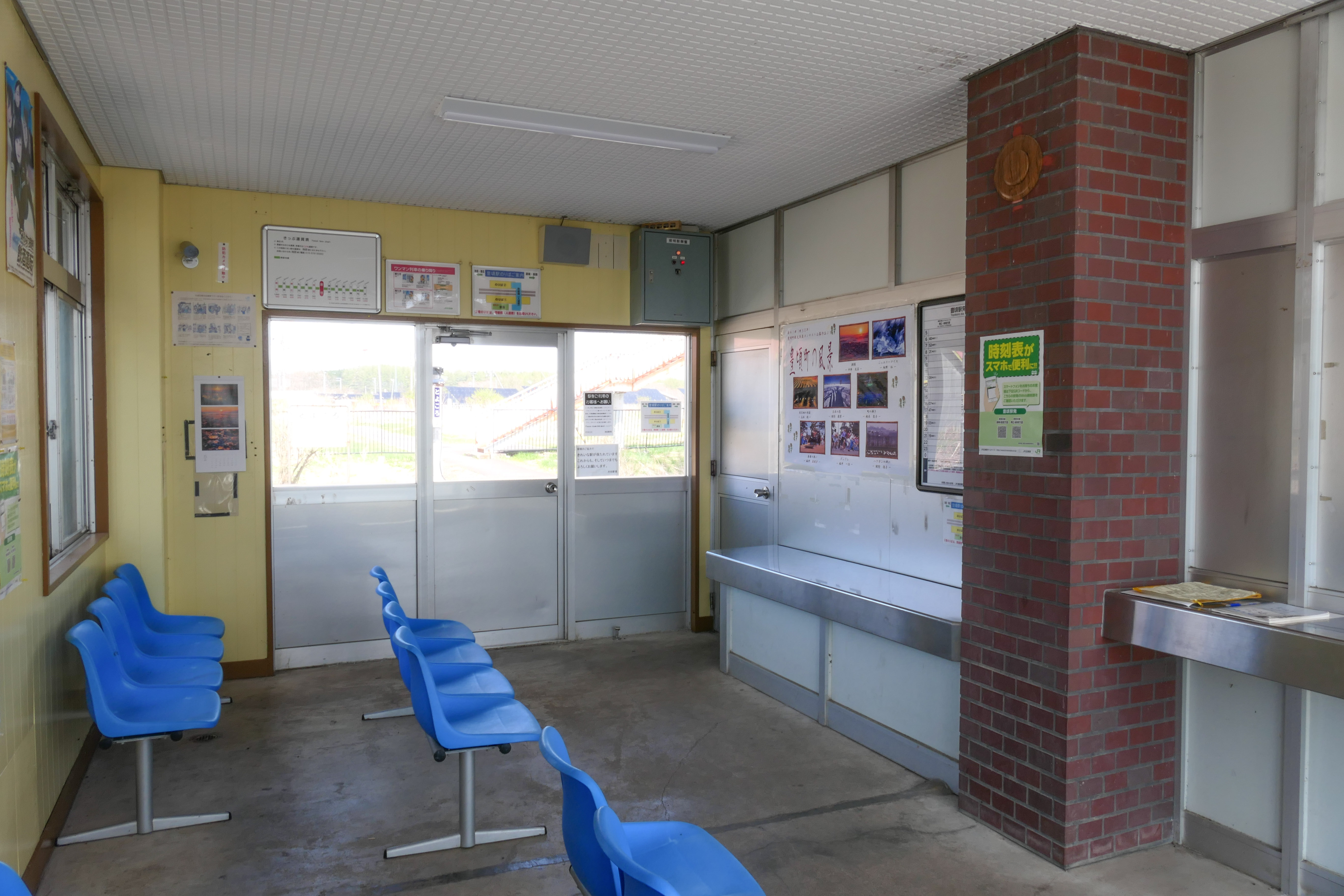
Waiting room

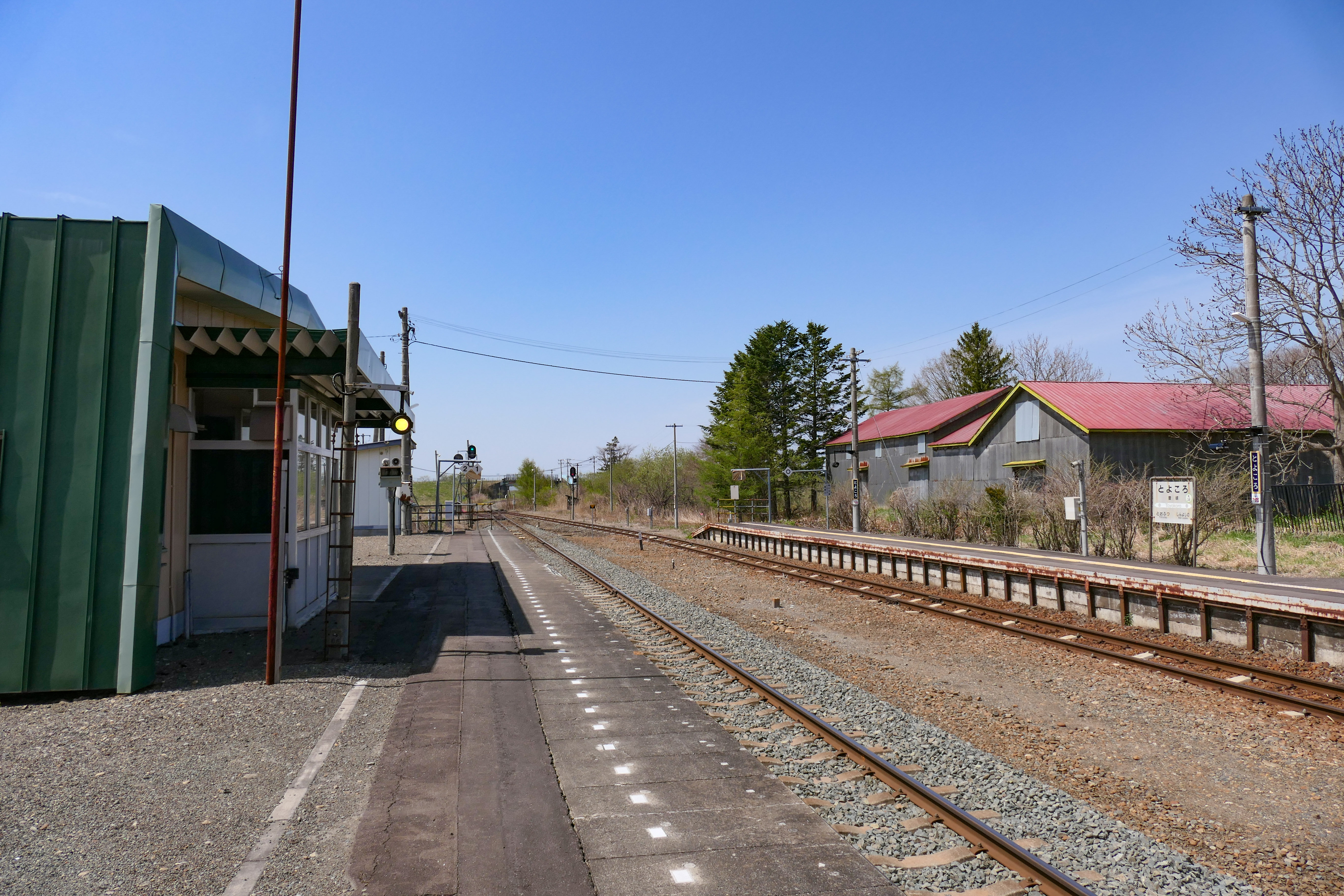
Platforms

== History ==
The station opened on 12 August 1904 as a station on the Japanese Government Railways.With the privatization of the Japan National Railway (JNR) on 1 April 1987, the station came under the aegis of the Hokkaido Railway Company (JR Hokkaido).

== Passenger statistics ==
In fiscal 2020, the station was used by under 10 passengers daily.

== Surrounding area ==
- Japan National Route 38
- Toyokoro Town Toyokoro Junior High School
- Toyokoro Town Toyokoro Elementary School

== See also ==
- List of railway stations in Japan
