= Urahoro, Hokkaido =

Urahoro 浦幌町 Urahoro-chō
- Town
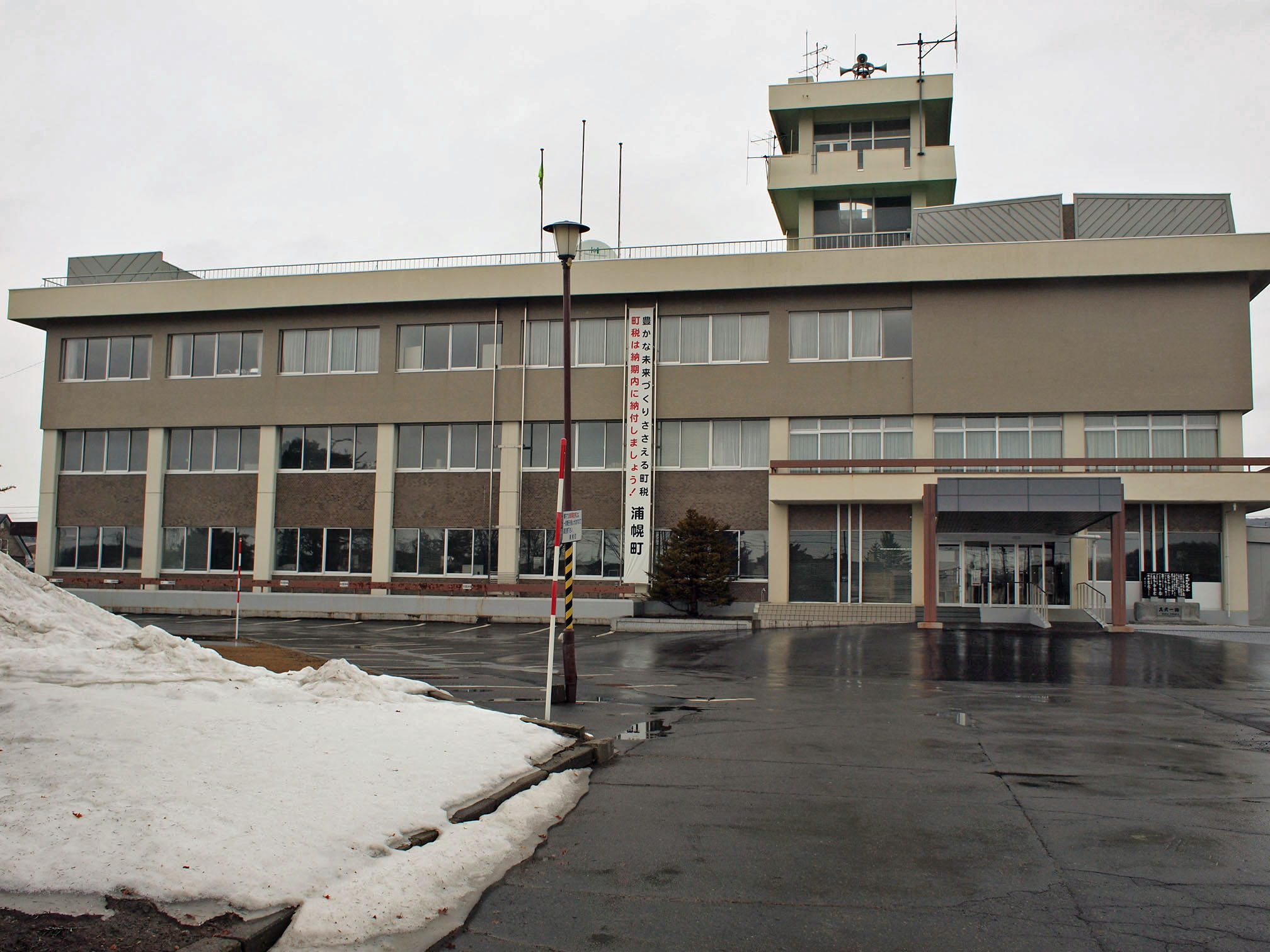
- Urahoro town hall

- Flag Emblem

- Location of Urahoro in Hokkaido (Tokachi Subprefecture)
- Interactive map of Urahoro
- Coordinates: 42°48′33″N 143°39′29″E
- Country: Japan
- Region: Hokkaido
- Prefecture: Hokkaido (Tokachi Subprefecture)
- District: Tokachi

Area
  - Total: 729.85 km^{2} (281.80 sq mi)

Population (October 31, 2025)
  - Total: 3,999
  - Density: 5.479/km^{2} (14.19/sq mi)
- Time zone: UTC+09:00 (JST)
- City hall address: 15-6 Sakuramachi, Urahoro-cho, Tokachi-gun, Hokkaido 089-5692
- Climate: Dfb
- Website: www.urahoro.jp
- Symbols
- Flower: Japanese rose
- Tree: Japanese rowan

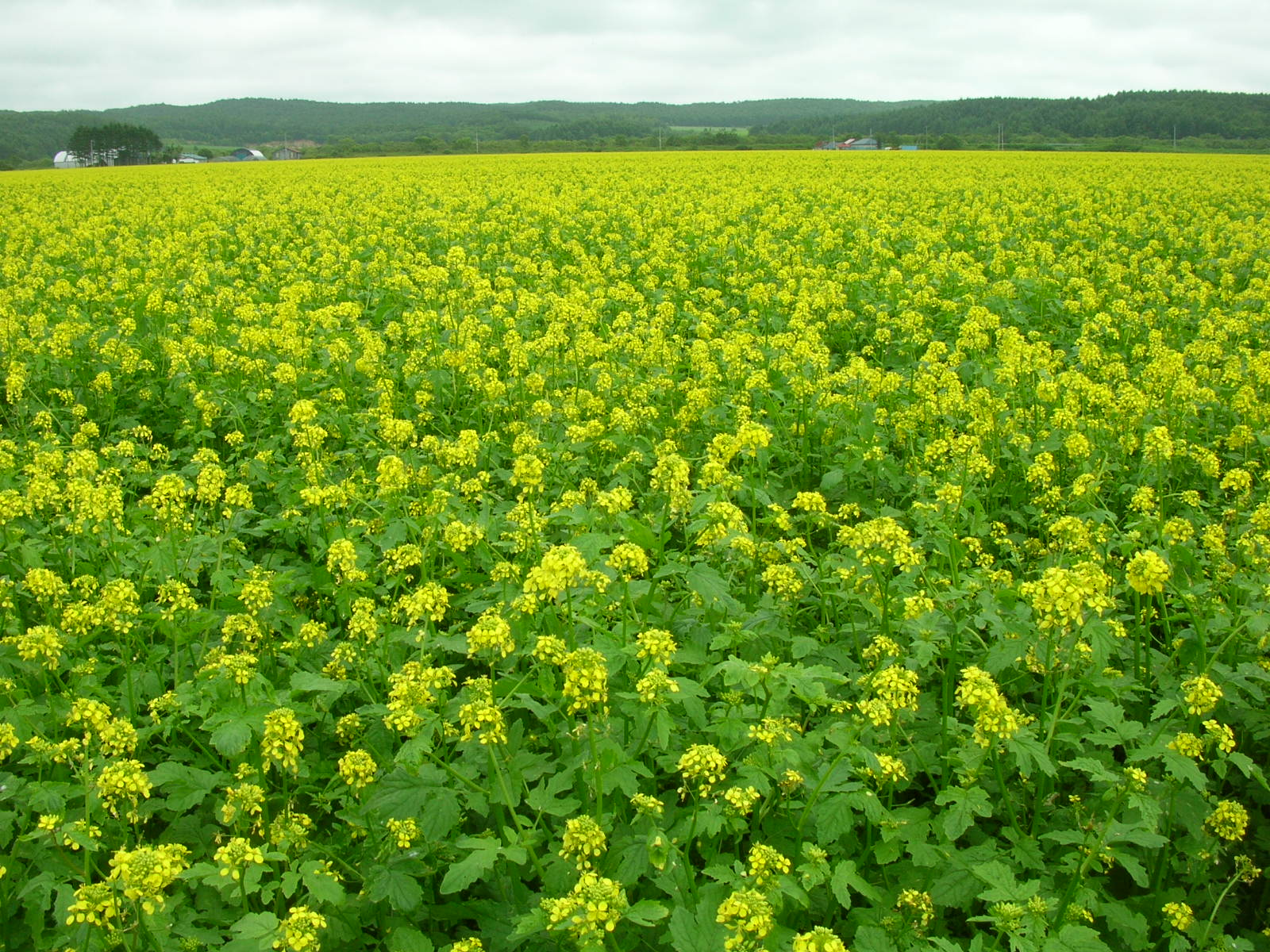
Fields in Urahoro

Urahoro (浦幌町, Urahoro-chō) is a town located in Tokachi Subprefecture, Hokkaidō, Japan. As of 31 October 2025, the town had an estimated population of 3999 in 2150 households, and a population density of 5.5 people per km^{2}. The total area of the town is 729.85 km^{2} (281.80 sq mi).

== Geography ==
Located in the easternmost part of the Tokachi Subprefecture, on the border with the Kushiro Subprefecture, the town stretches north to south along the Urahoro River basin. Located on the western edge of the Shiranuka Hills, the town is mostly hilly and plateau-like, with forests accounting for 70% of the total area. The southern part faces the Pacific Ocean. At the southern end of the town, a flat area stretches from the downstream Urahoro River to the mouth of the Tokachi River, used as farmland and pastureland.

=== Neighboring municipalities ===
- Toyokoro
- Ikeda
- Honbestu
- Kushiro
- Shiranuka

=== Climate ===
According to the Köppen climate classification, Urahoro has a humid continental climate. It has large temperature differences, including large annual and daily temperature ranges. It receives a lot of snow, and is designated as a heavy snow area. In winter, temperatures below -20 °C are not uncommon, making it extremely cold.

== Climate ==
Climate data for Urahoro (1991−2020 normals, extremes 1977−present)
Month	Jan	Feb	Mar	Apr	May	Jun	Jul	Aug	Sep	Oct	Nov	Dec	Year
Record high °C (°F)	8.6 (47.5)	11.9 (53.4)	18.7 (65.7)	31.6 (88.9)	37.9 (100.2)	36.1 (97.0)	35.6 (96.1)	36.0 (96.8)	32.8 (91.0)	27.5 (81.5)	21.0 (69.8)	14.8 (58.6)	37.9 (100.2)
Mean daily maximum °C (°F)	−0.8 (30.6)	0.1 (32.2)	4.5 (40.1)	10.8 (51.4)	16.1 (61.0)	19.1 (66.4)	22.5 (72.5)	24.1 (75.4)	21.6 (70.9)	16.0 (60.8)	8.9 (48.0)	1.6 (34.9)	12.0 (53.7)
Daily mean °C (°F)	−6.9 (19.6)	−5.8 (21.6)	−0.7 (30.7)	5.0 (41.0)	10.3 (50.5)	13.9 (57.0)	17.7 (63.9)	19.4 (66.9)	16.4 (61.5)	10.0 (50.0)	3.2 (37.8)	−4.0 (24.8)	6.5 (43.8)
Mean daily minimum °C (°F)	−13.2 (8.2)	−12.3 (9.9)	−6.1 (21.0)	−0.4 (31.3)	5.1 (41.2)	9.8 (49.6)	14.2 (57.6)	15.8 (60.4)	12.1 (53.8)	4.4 (39.9)	−2.1 (28.2)	−9.6 (14.7)	1.5 (34.7)
Record low °C (°F)	−25.6 (−14.1)	−26.8 (−16.2)	−20.8 (−5.4)	−11.0 (12.2)	−4.2 (24.4)	0.0 (32.0)	6.0 (42.8)	6.5 (43.7)	0.9 (33.6)	−5.1 (22.8)	−14.3 (6.3)	−20.5 (−4.9)	−26.8 (−16.2)
Average precipitation mm (inches)	43.9 (1.73)	28.9 (1.14)	47.0 (1.85)	68.5 (2.70)	103.6 (4.08)	90.7 (3.57)	108.0 (4.25)	139.1 (5.48)	150.9 (5.94)	106.9 (4.21)	63.0 (2.48)	55.4 (2.18)	1,005.9 (39.60)
Average snowfall cm (inches)	76 (30)	67 (26)	61 (24)	9 (3.5)	2 (0.8)	0 (0)	0 (0)	0 (0)	0 (0)	0 (0)	10 (3.9)	55 (22)	281 (111)
Average precipitation days (≥ 1.0 mm)	5.1	4.3	6.0	8.3	9.5	8.5	10.1	11.0	10.5	8.1	6.9	6.3	94.6
Average snowy days	8.8	8.1	7.6	1.2	0.2	0	0	0	0	0	1.3	6.2	33.4
Mean monthly sunshine hours	181.3	182.5	213.7	192.7	184.1	150.0	126.3	130.4	145.6	177.1	172.8	167.7	2,024
Source: JMA

=== Demographics ===
Per Japanese census data, the population of Urahoro has declined in recent decades.

Historical population
Year	Pop.	±%
1970	11,726	—
1980	9,693	−17.3%
1990	8,395	−13.4%
2000	6,846	−18.5%
2010	5,458	−20.3%
2020	4,387	−19.6%

== History ==
In April 1906, with the implementation of the Hokkaido Second-Class Town and Village System, Seigo Village was established. In April 1912 it changed it name to Urahoro Village, with the new name coming from the Ainu language from the word "Uraraporo" (much fog), or from "Orapuoro" (where the mountain peony is found). It was elevated to town status in April 1954.

== Government ==
Urahoro has a mayor-council form of government with a directly elected mayor and a unicameral town council of 11 members. Urahoro, as part of Tokachi Subprefecture, contributes four members to the Hokkaidō Legislative Assembly. In terms of national politics, the town is part of the Hokkaidō 11th district of the lower house of the Diet of Japan.

== Economy ==
The economy of Urahoro is centered on livestock farming. Historically, the area was a horse-breeding center (for cavalry horse), and after World War II, the area transitioned to coal mining and dairy farming. The coal mines have closed. Beef cattle production and field crops are thriving, with particularly high potato and sugar beet yields. Commercial fishing includes rich salmon fishing ground, octopus, and kelp harvesting.

== Education ==
Urahoro has three public elementary schools and public middle schools operated by the town government. The town does not have a high school.

== Transportation ==
JR Hokkaido - Nemuro Main Line

■ Shin-Yoshino - Urahoro - Atsunai

=== Highways ===
- Dōtō Expressway
- National Route 38

== Local attractions ==
- Otafunbe Chashi ruins, National Historic Site
- Urahoro Shinyoshinodai Microlith Site - Prefectural Historic Site
- Tokachi Okoppe Site - Prefectural Historic Site
- Tokachifuto Ruins - Prefectural Historic Site; excavated items are housed at the Urahoro Town Museum
- Toyokita Primeval Flower Garden - A primeval flower garden stretching along the Pacific coast
- Toma Hot Springs
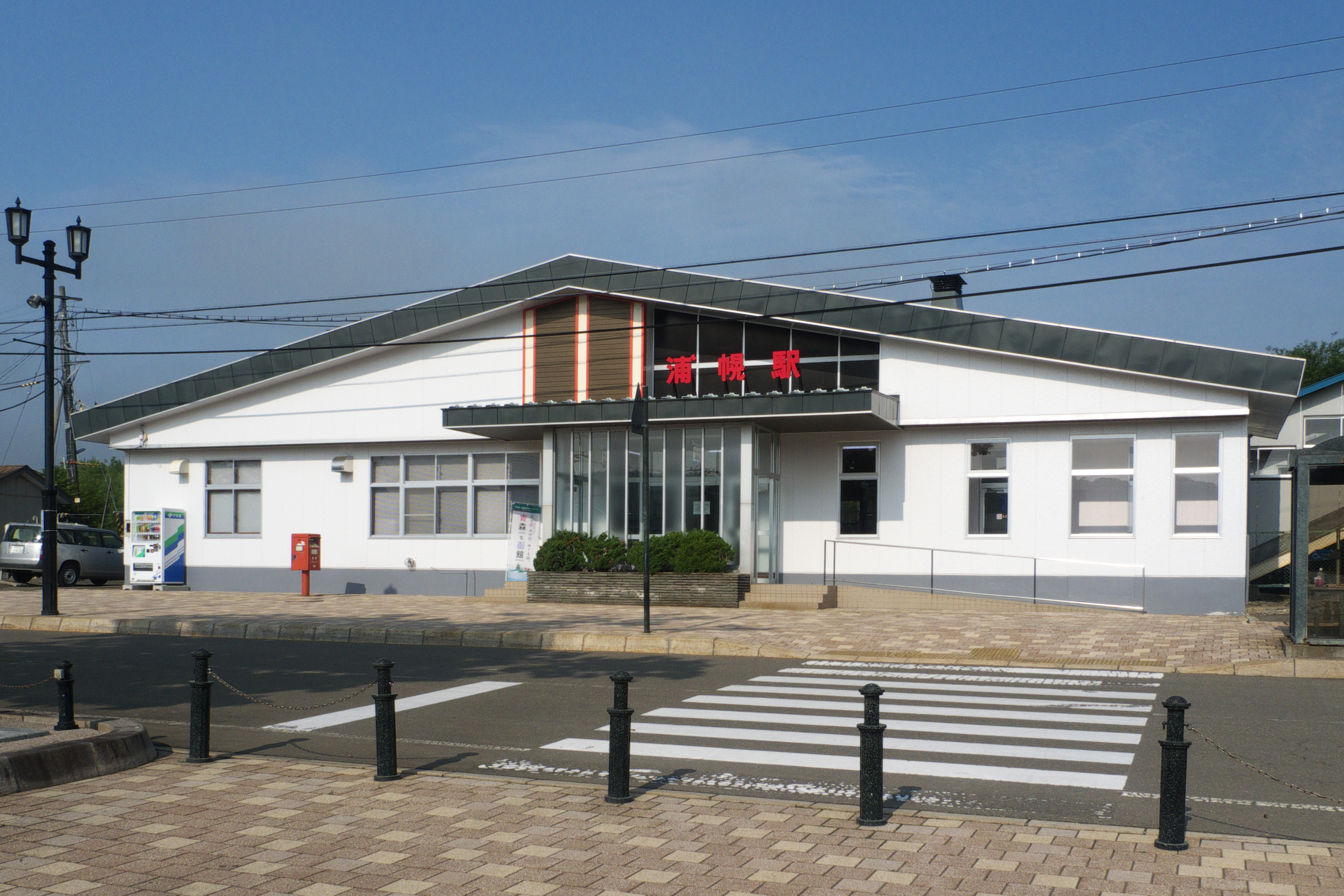
Ueahoro railway station

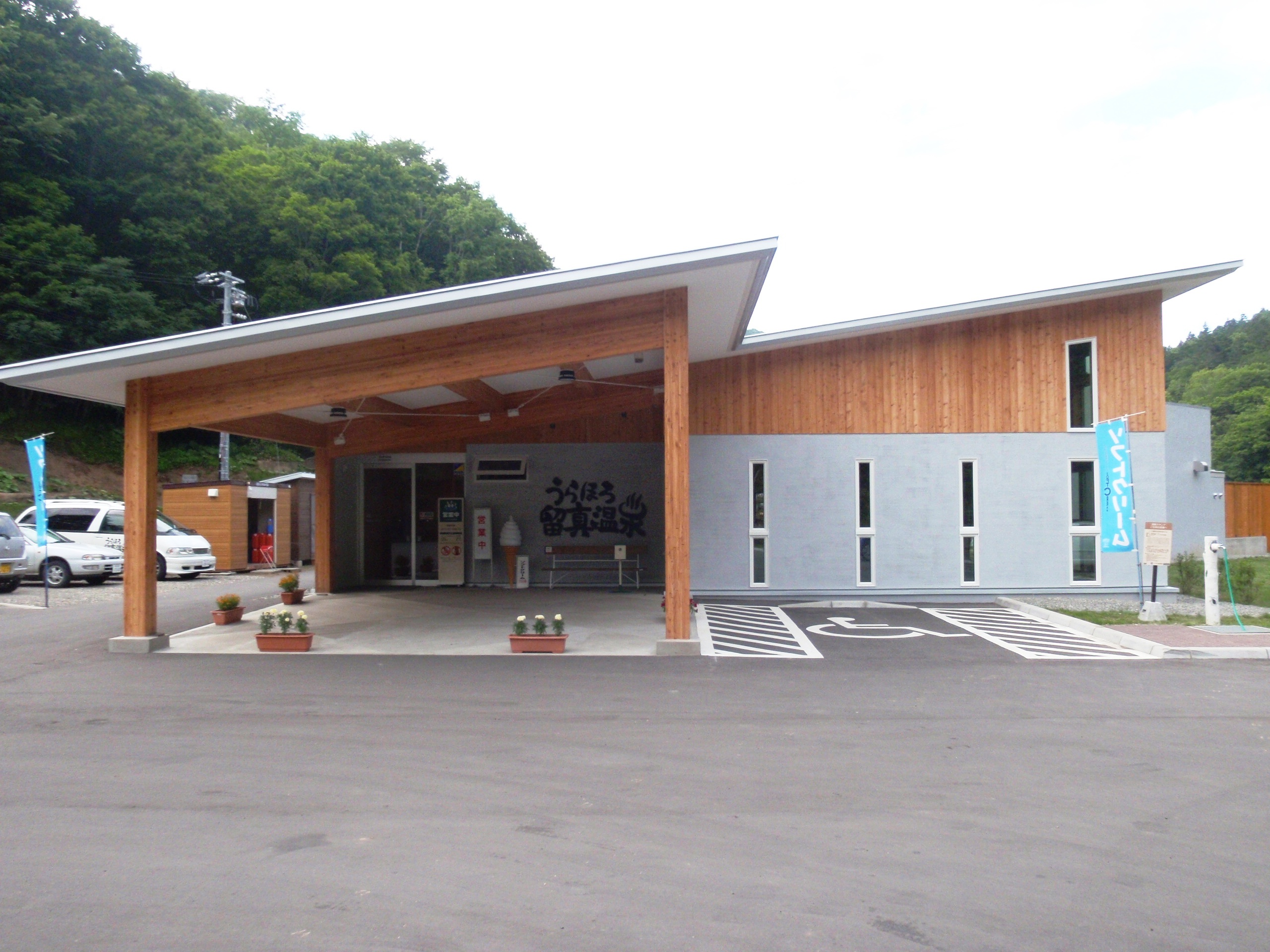
Rushin onsen

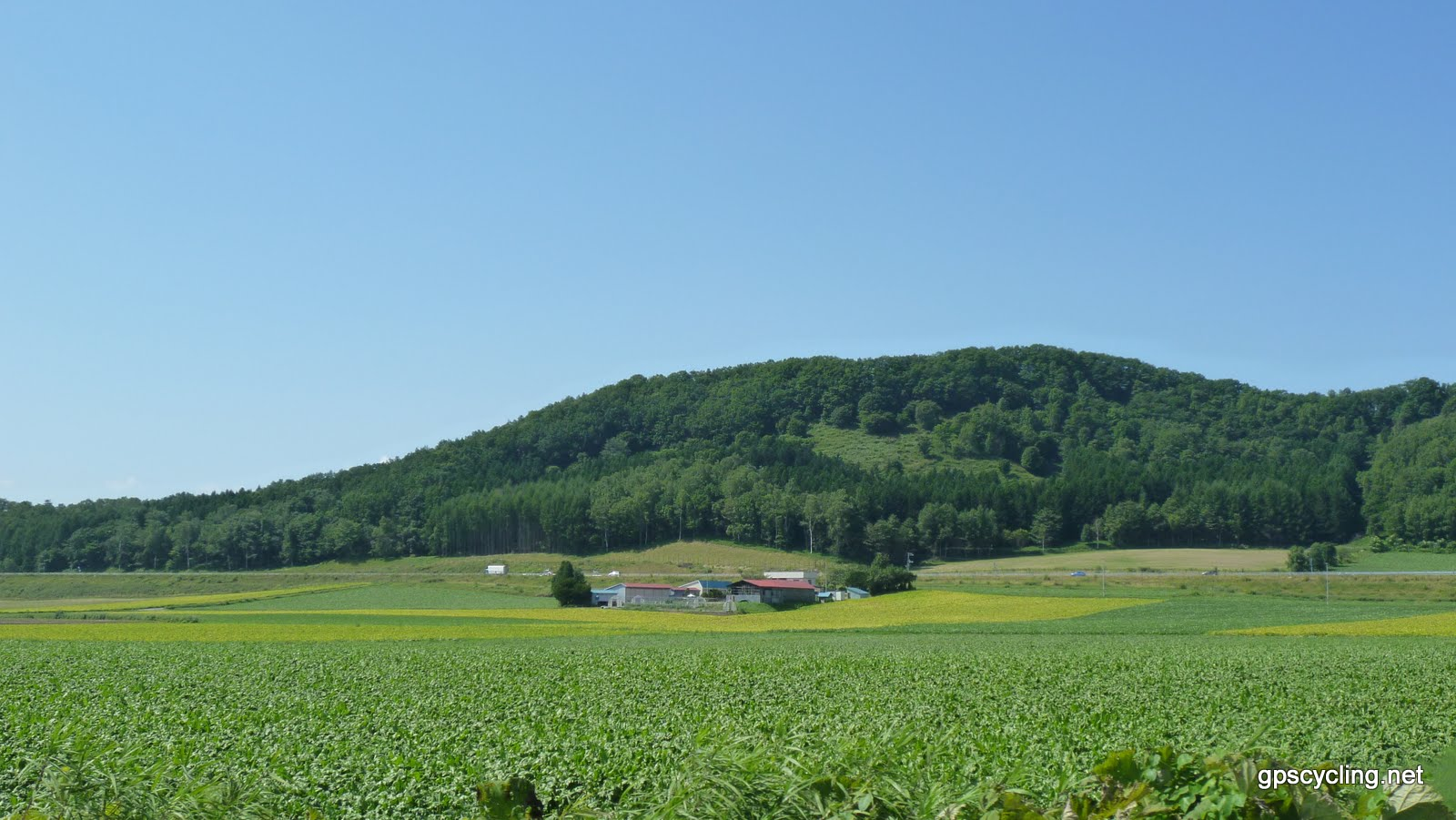
Urahoro panorama

== Noted people from Urahoro ==
- Hideo Azuma, manga artist

== Mascot ==
Uraha and Horoma, the town's mascots

Urahoro's mascots are Uraha (ウラハ) and Horoma (ホロマ) are grey herons who are siblings. They lived in the forests of Urahoro.

- Uraha is cheerful, mischievous and a little sloppy and gluttonous. His good luck charm is a Japanese rowan branch (which he carries all the time). He can eat delicious food. Because of this he promotes food from the town.
- Horoma is gentle but solid and caring. She usually volunteers for other activities. Her good luck charm is a Japanese rose (which she wears on her head).
