= Shin-Yoshino Station =

Railway station in Urahoro, Hokkaido, Japan

K39 Shin-Yoshino Station 新吉野駅
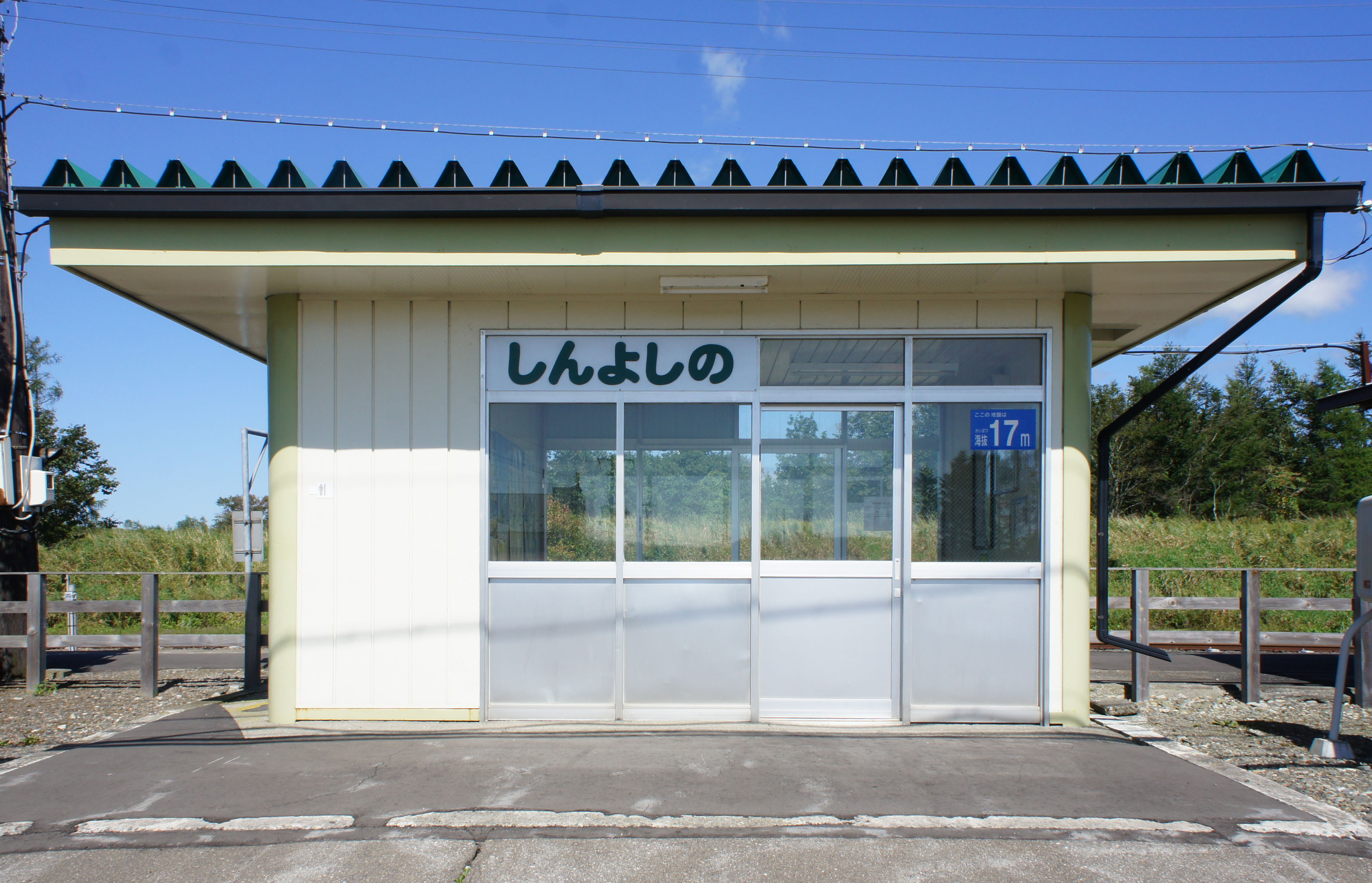
- Station building in September 2018

General information
- Location: Heiwa, Urahoro, Tokachi District, Hokkaido 089-5543; Japan
- Coordinates: 42°46′41.66″N 143°36′29.74″E
- System: regional rail
- Operator: JR Hokkaido
- Line: Nemuro Main Line
- Distance: 89.0km from Shintoku
- Platforms: 1 side platform
- Tracks: 3

Construction
- Structure type: At-grade
- Accessible: No

Other information
- Status: Unstaffed
- Station code: K39
- Website: Official website

History
- Opened: 10 January 1910; 116 years ago

Passengers
- FY2024: >10 daily

Services
Preceding station	JR Hokkaido	Following station
Toyokoro towards Takikawa	Nemuro Main Line Local	Urahoro towards Nemuro
Location
- Location within Hokkaido Location within Japan

Shin-Yoshino Station (新吉野駅, Shin-Yoshino-eki) is a railway station located in the town of Urahoro, Tokachi District, Hokkaidō, It is operated by JR Hokkaido.

== Lines ==
The station is served by the Nemuro Main Line, and lies 89.0 km from the starting point of the line at Shintoku.

== Layout ==
Originally, the station had two platforms and three tracks, with a side platform on the right side of the station when facing towards Nemuro, and an staggered island platform for secondary lines. The platforms are connected by a level crossing. However, only the side platform is currently in use. The station building is unattended.

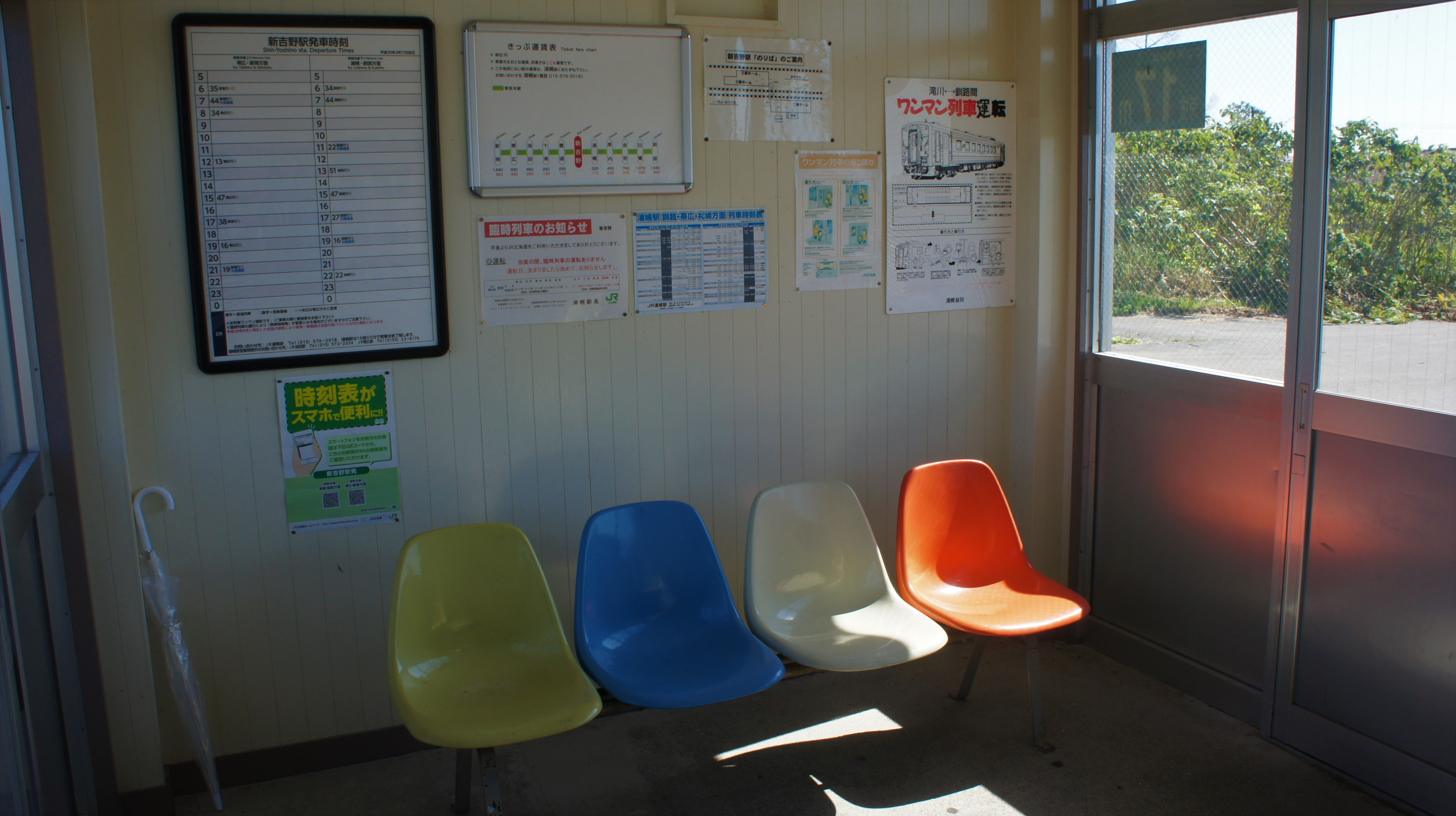
Waiting room

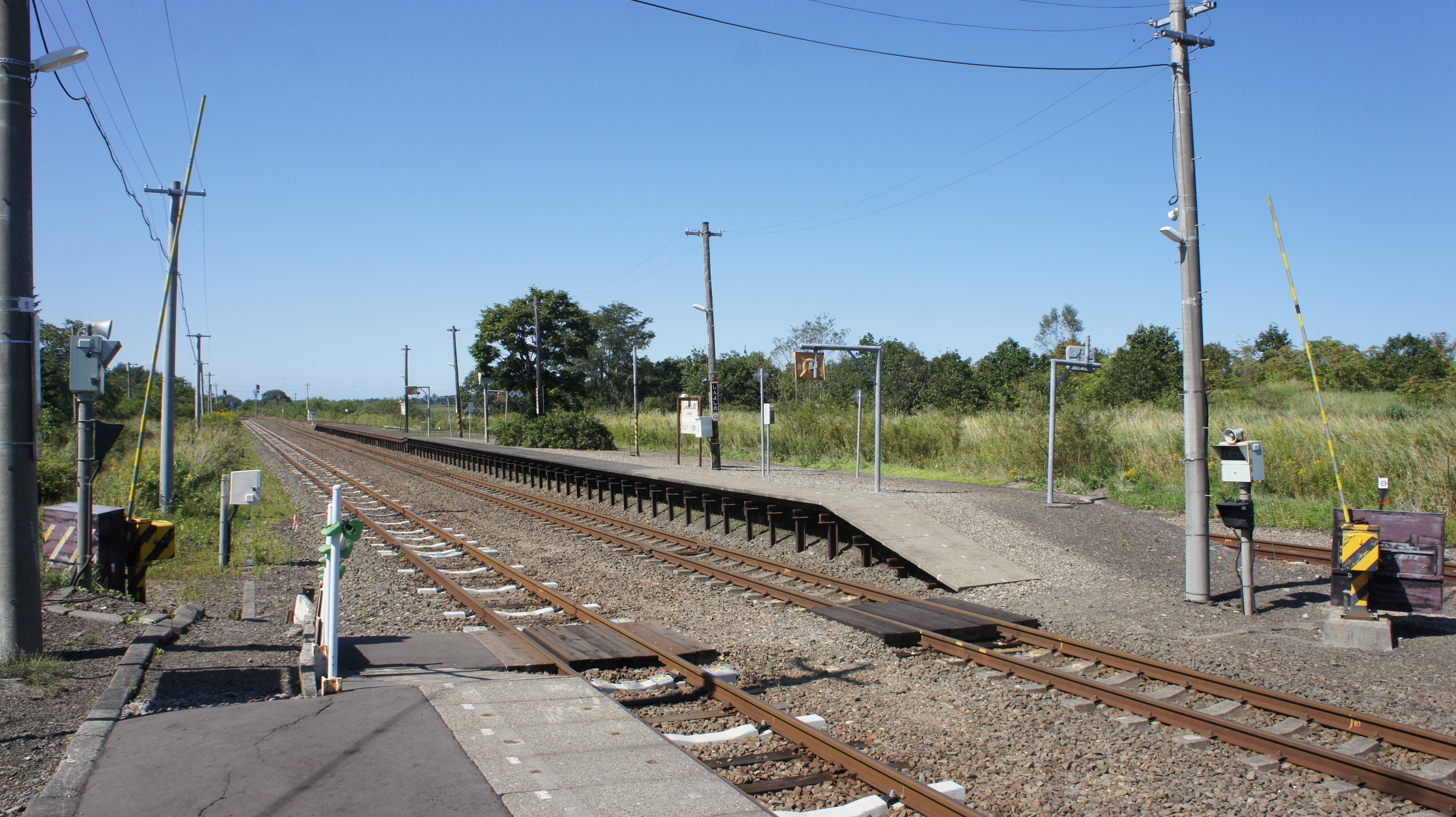
Platforms

== History ==
The station opened on 10 January 1910 as a station on the Japanese Government Railways on 1 April 1905.

== Passenger statistics ==
In fiscal 2020, the station was used by under 10 passengers daily.

== Surrounding area ==
- Japan National Route 38
- Yoshino Post Office

== See also ==
- List of railway stations in Japan
