= Urahoro Station =

Railway station in Urahoro, Hokkaido, Japan

K40 Urahoro Station 浦幌駅
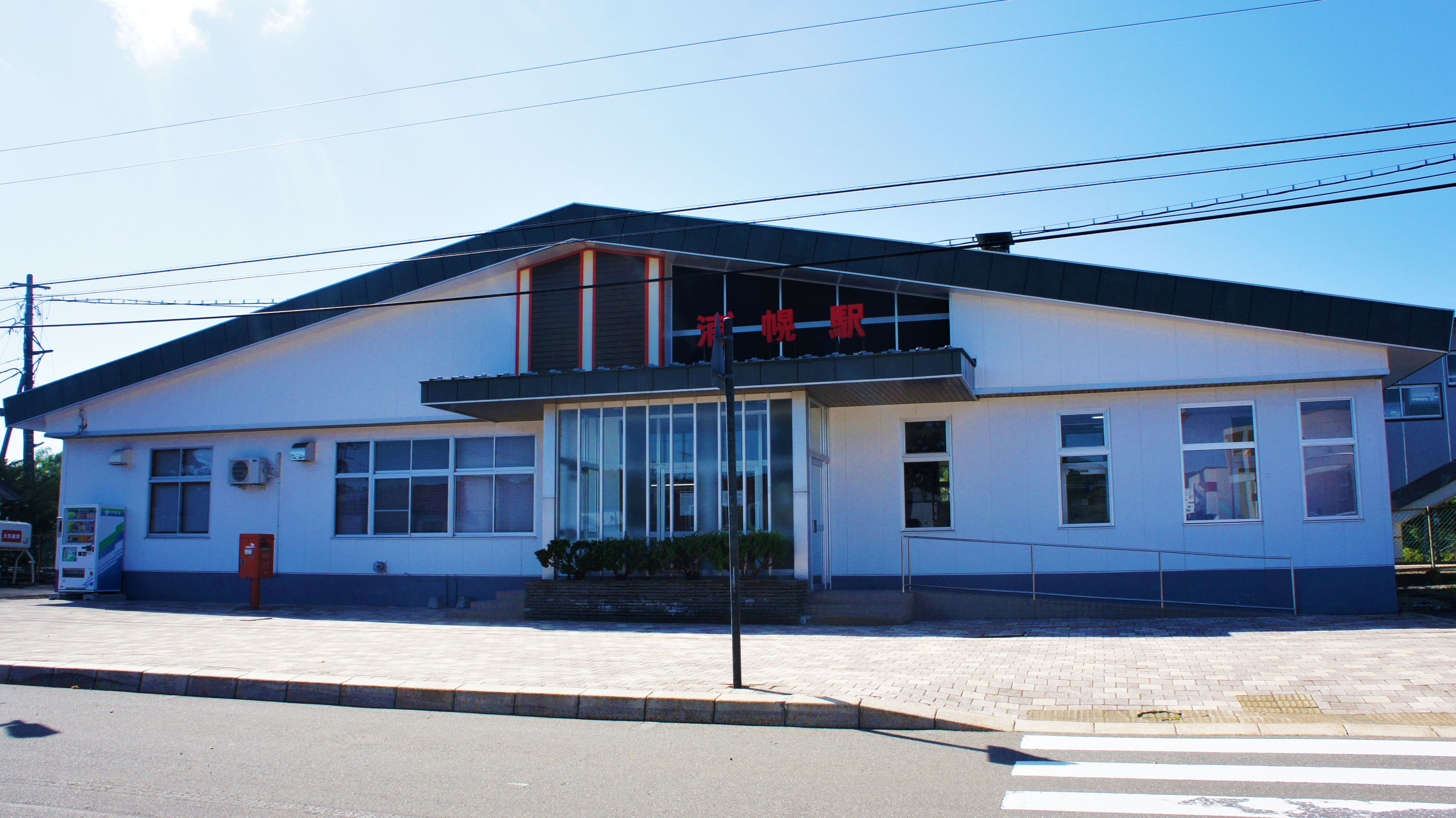
- Station building in September 2018

General information
- Location: Sakaemachi, Urahoro, Tokachi District, Hokkaido 089-5604; Japan
- Coordinates: 42°48′37.77″N 143°39′5.41″E
- System: regional rail
- Operator: JR Hokkaido
- Line: Nemuro Main Line
- Distance: 95.4km from Shintoku
- Platforms: 2 side platforms
- Tracks: 2

Construction
- Structure type: At-grade
- Accessible: No

Other information
- Status: Staffed (Midori no Madoguchi)
- Station code: K40
- Website: Official website

History
- Opened: 25 December 1903; 122 years ago

Passengers
- FY2018: 110 daily

Services
Preceding station	JR Hokkaido	Following station
Shin-Yoshino towards Takikawa	Nemuro Main Line Local	Atsunai towards Nemuro
Location
- Location within Hokkaido Location within Japan

Urahoro Station (浦幌駅, Urahoro-eki) is a railway station located in the town of Urahoro, Tokachi District, Hokkaidō, It is operated by JR Hokkaido.

== Lines ==
The station is served by the Nemuro Main Line, and lies 95.4 km from the starting point of the line at Shintoku.

== Layout ==
Urahoro Station has two opposed side platforms, connected by a footbridge. The station is staffed and has a Midori no Madoguchi ticket office.

=== Platforms ===
1	■ Nemuro Main Line	for Obihiro and Shintoku
2	■ Nemuro Main Line	for Kushiro

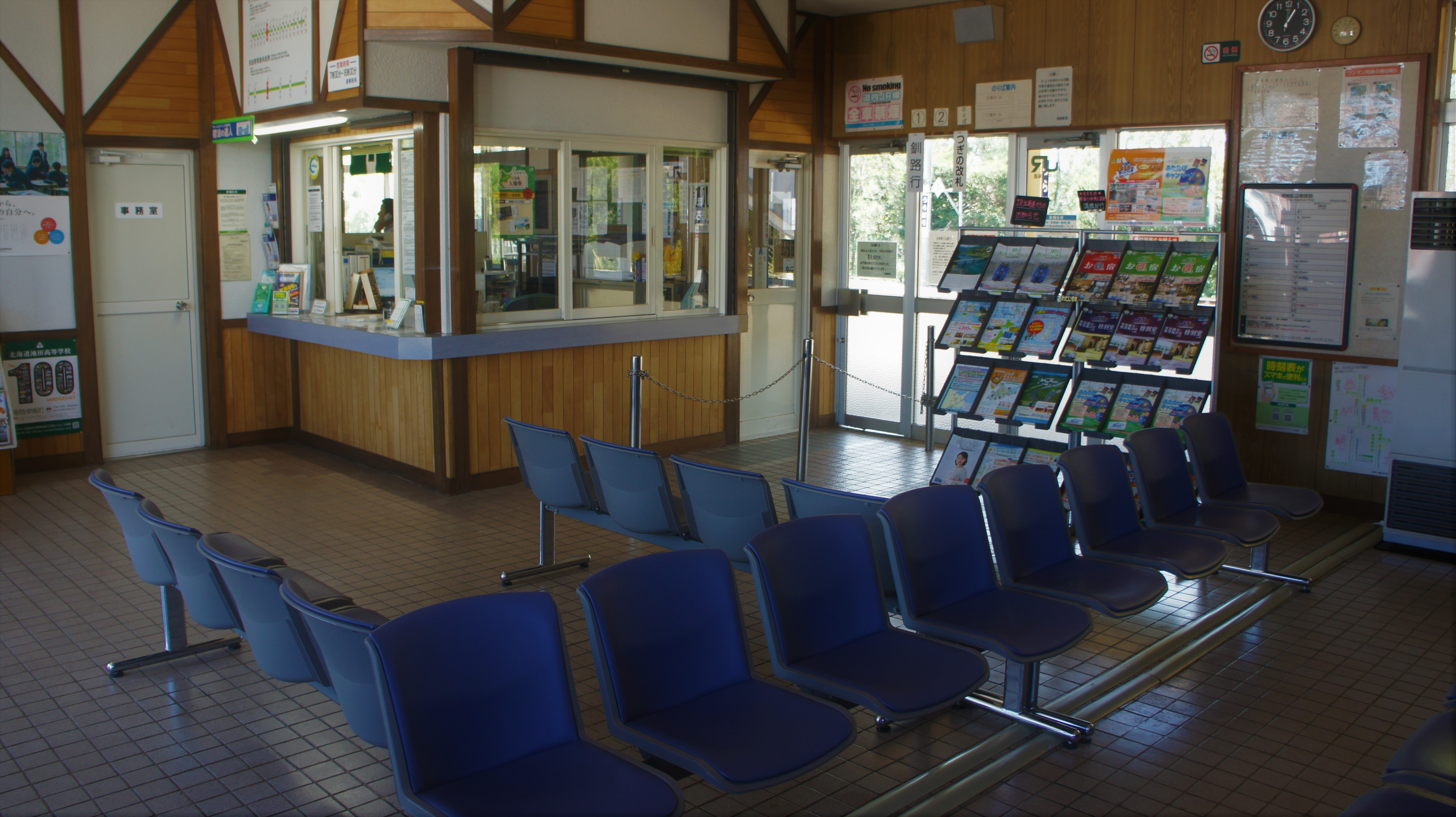
Waiting room

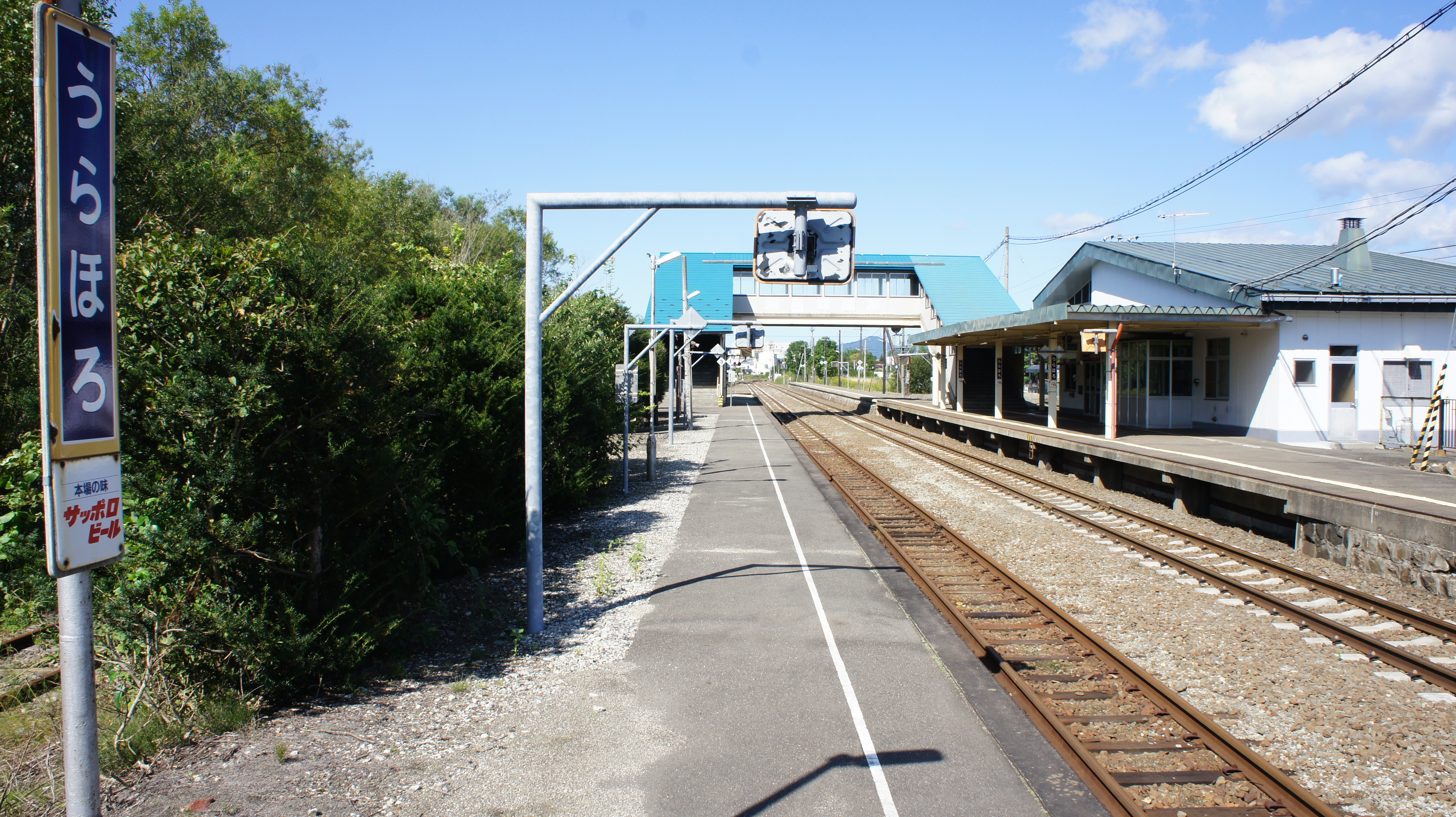
Platforms

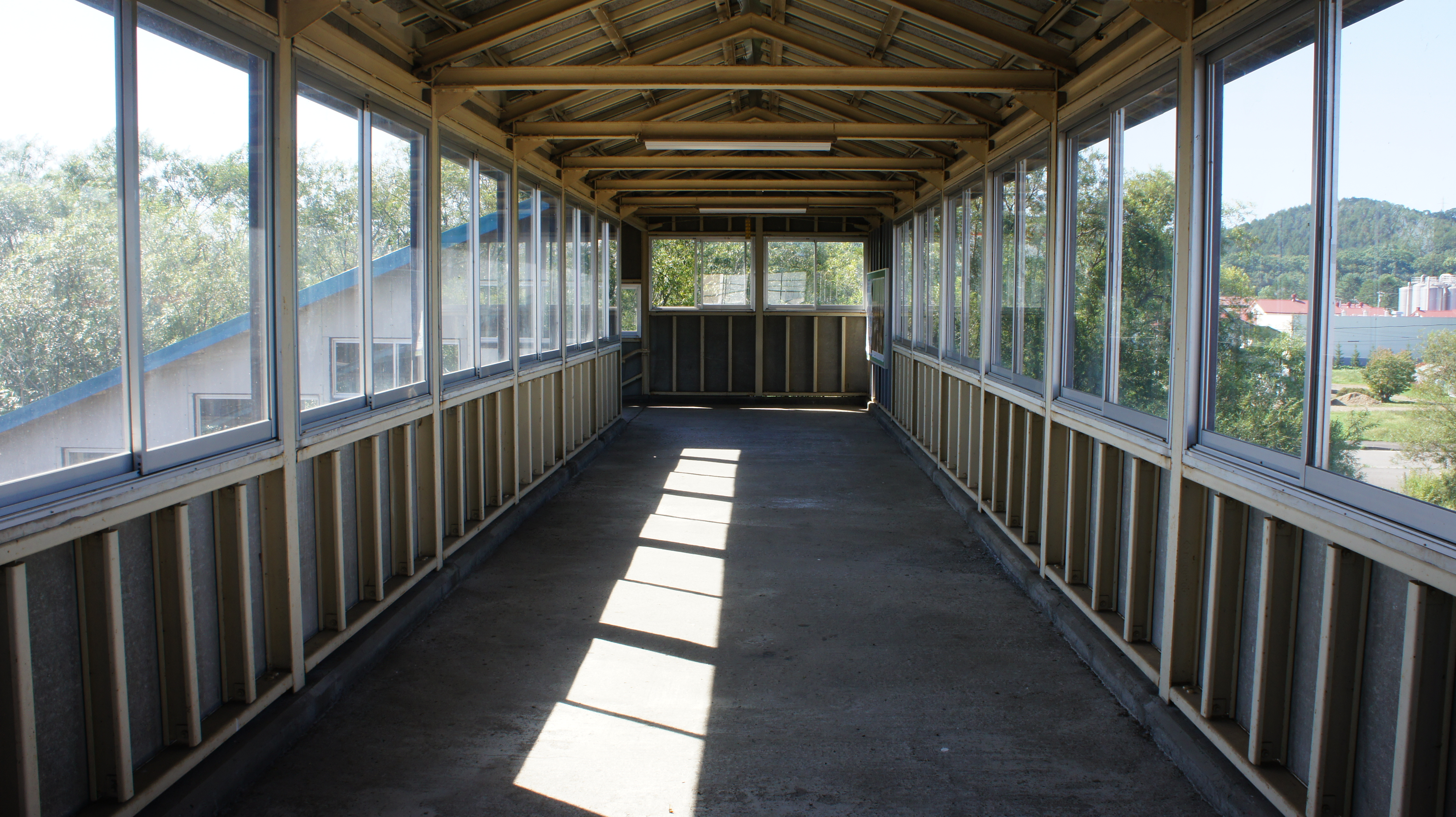
Footbridge

== History ==
The station opened on 25 December 1903 as a station on the Hokkaidō Kansetsu Tetsudō. It was transferred to the Ministry of Railways on 1 April 1905. Following the privatization of the Japanese National Railways on 1 April 1987, the station came under the control of JR Hokkaido.

== Passenger statistics ==
In fiscal 2018, the station was used by an average of 110 passengers daily.

== Surrounding area ==
The station is located in the center of the main urban area of Urahoro.

- Hokkaido Prefectural Highway 413 Urahoro Station Line
- Hokkaido Prefectural Highway 56 Honbetsu-Urahoro Line
- Hokkaido Prefectural Highway 597 Tofu-Urahoro Line
- Urahoro Town Office

== See also ==
- List of railway stations in Japan
