= Tōfutsu Station =

Railway station in Toyokoro, Hokkaido, Japan

K37 Tōfutsu Station 十弗駅
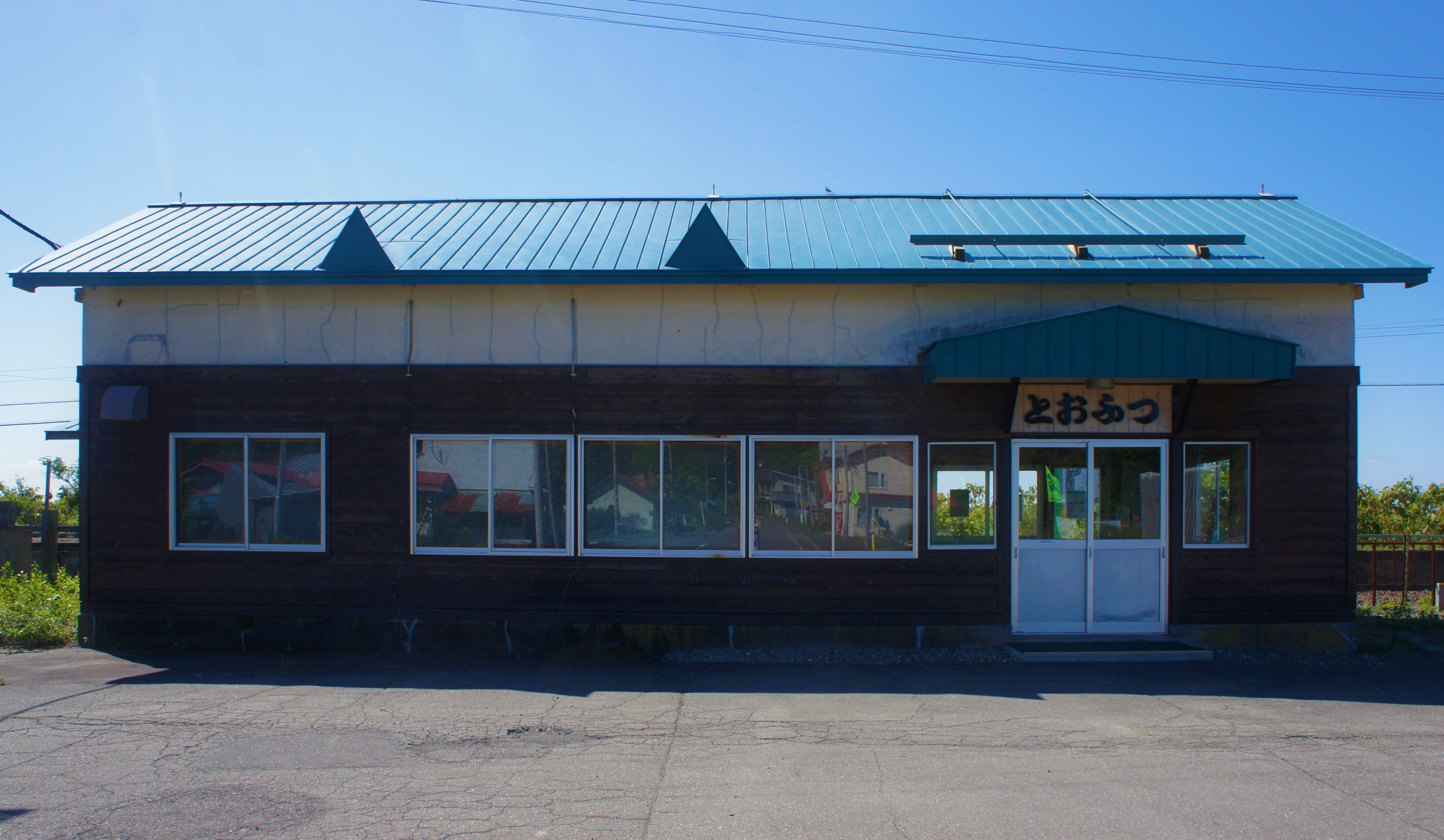
- Station building in September 2018

General information
- Location: Tofutsutakaramachi, Toyokoro, Nakagawa District, Hokkaido 089-5243; Japan
- Coordinates: 42°51′20.66″N 143°30′2.91″E
- System: regional rail
- Operator: JR Hokkaido
- Line: Nemuro Main Line
- Distance: 76.5km from Shintoku
- Platforms: 1 side platform
- Tracks: 1

Construction
- Structure type: At-grade
- Accessible: No

Other information
- Status: Unstaffed
- Station code: K37
- Website: Official website

History
- Opened: 5 December 1911; 114 years ago

Passengers
- FY2024: >10 daily

Services
Preceding station	JR Hokkaido	Following station
Ikeda towards Takikawa	Nemuro Main Line Local	Toyokoro towards Nemuro
Location
- Location within Hokkaido Location within Japan

Tōfutsu Station (十弗駅, Tōfutsu-eki) is a railway station located in the town of Toyokoro, Nakagawa District, Hokkaidō, It is operated by JR Hokkaido.

== Lines ==
The station is served by the Nemuro Main Line, and lies 76.5 km from the starting point of the line at Shintoku.

== Layout ==
Tōfutsu station has a single side platform with a wooden station building on the left when facing in the direction of Nemuro. It formerly had an island platform, but was converted to a single track in the late 1980. The station building is unattended.

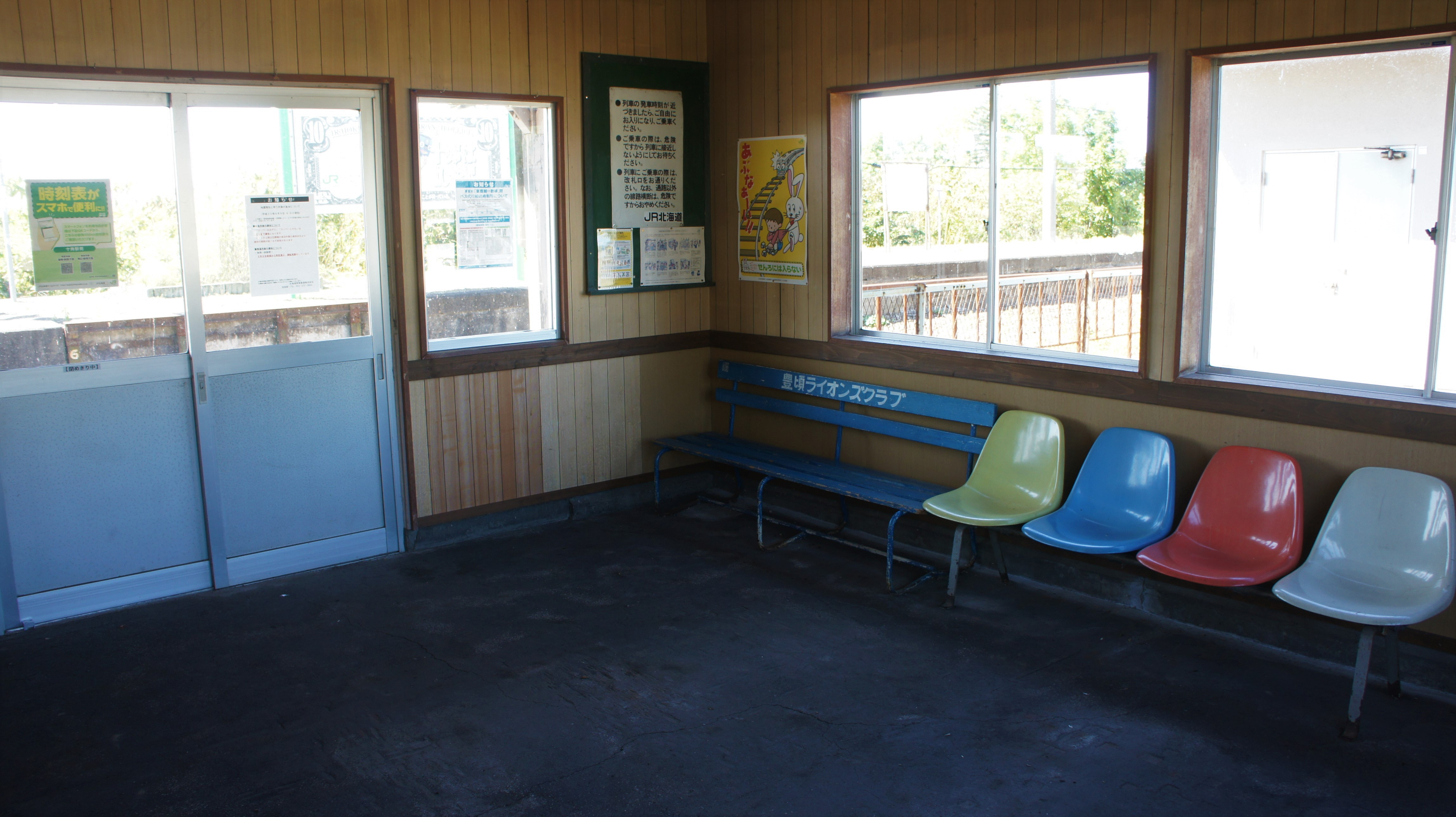
Waiting room

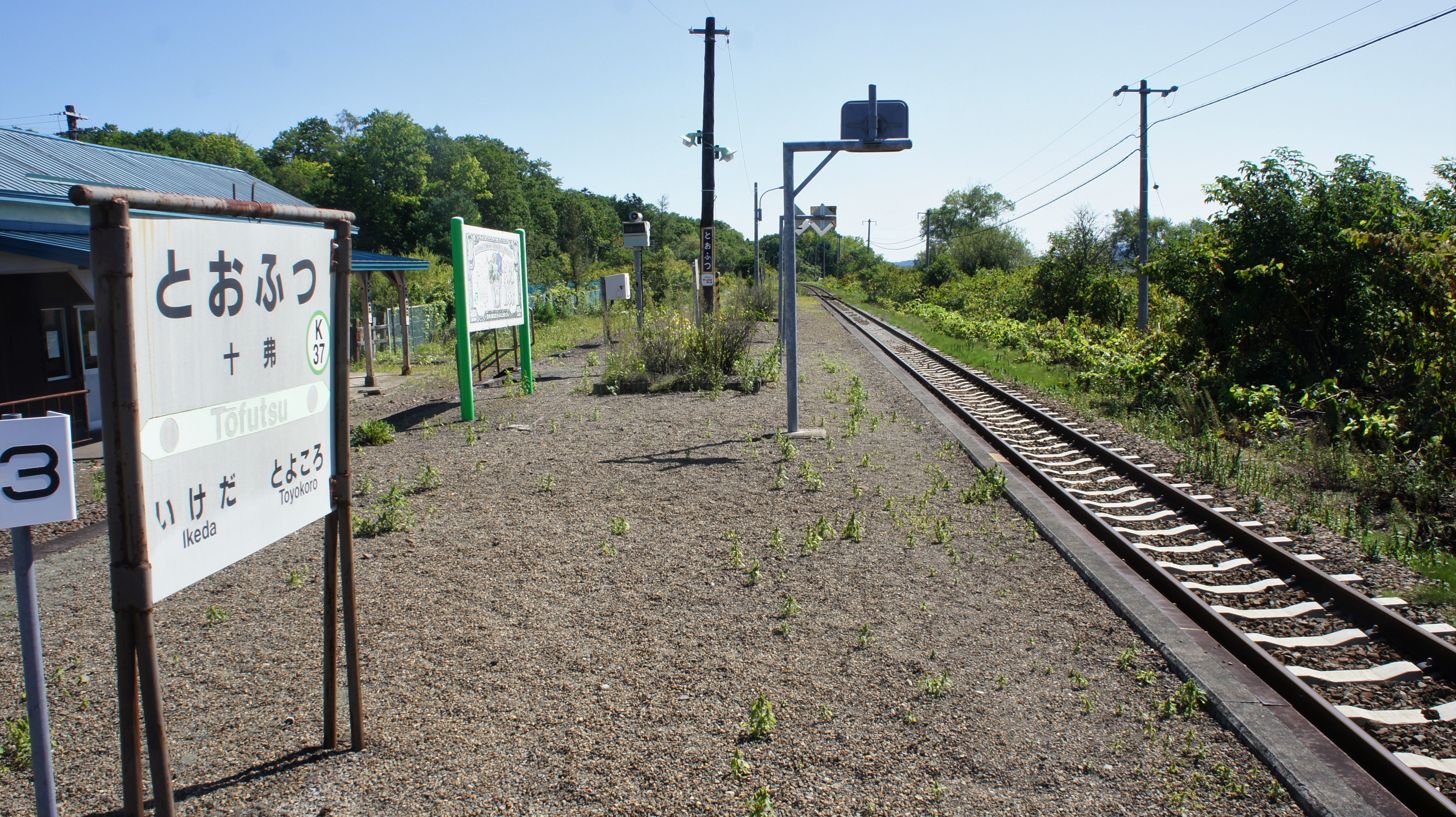
Platforms

== History ==
The station opened on 5 December 1911 as a station on the Japanese Government Railways. With the privatization of the Japan National Railway (JNR) on 1 April 1987, the station came under the aegis of the Hokkaido Railway Company (JR Hokkaido).

== Passenger statistics ==
In fiscal 2020, the station was used by under 20 passengers daily.

== Surrounding area ==
- Hokkaido Prefectural Route 73
- Hokkaido Prefectural Route 882.

== See also ==
- List of railway stations in Japan
