= Ikeda, Hokkaido =

Town in Japan

Ikeda 池田町} Honbetsu-chō
- Town
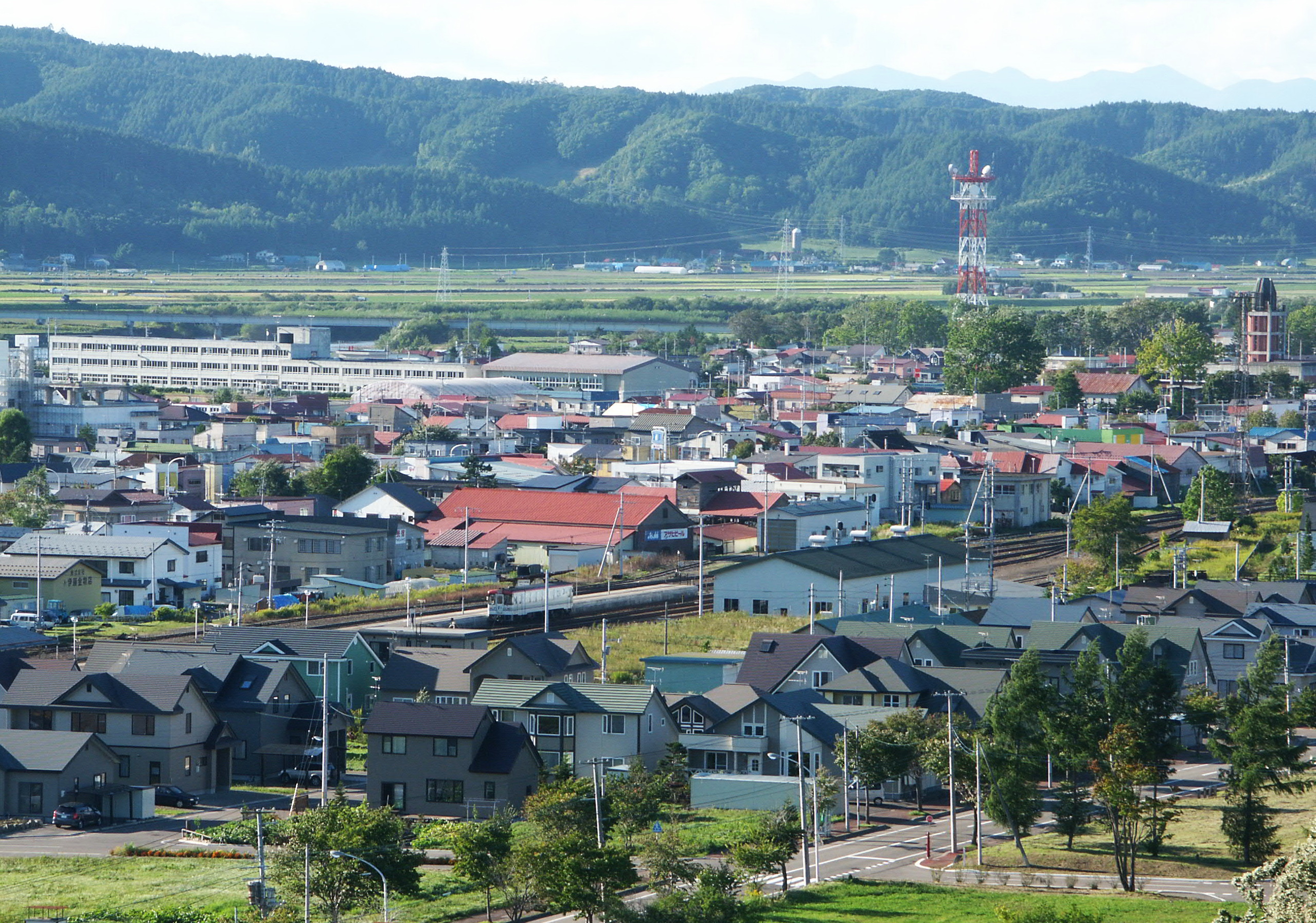
- View of Ikeda

- Flag Emblem

- Interactive map of Ikeda
- Coordinates: 42°55′44″N 143°26′54″E
- Country: Japan
- Region: Hokkaido
- Prefecture: Hokkaido (Tokachi Subprefecture)
- District: Nakagawa (Tokachi)

Area
  - Total: 371.79 km^{2} (143.55 sq mi)

Population (December 31, 2025)
  - Total: 5,773
  - Density: 15.53/km^{2} (40.22/sq mi)
- Time zone: UTC+09:00 (JST)
- City hall address: 11-7 Nishi 1-jo, Ikeda-cho, Nakagawa-gun, Hokkaido 083–8650
- Climate: Dfb
- Website: www.town.hokkaido-ikeda.lg.jp
- Symbols
- Flower: Azalea
- Tree: Sakura, Daimyo Oak

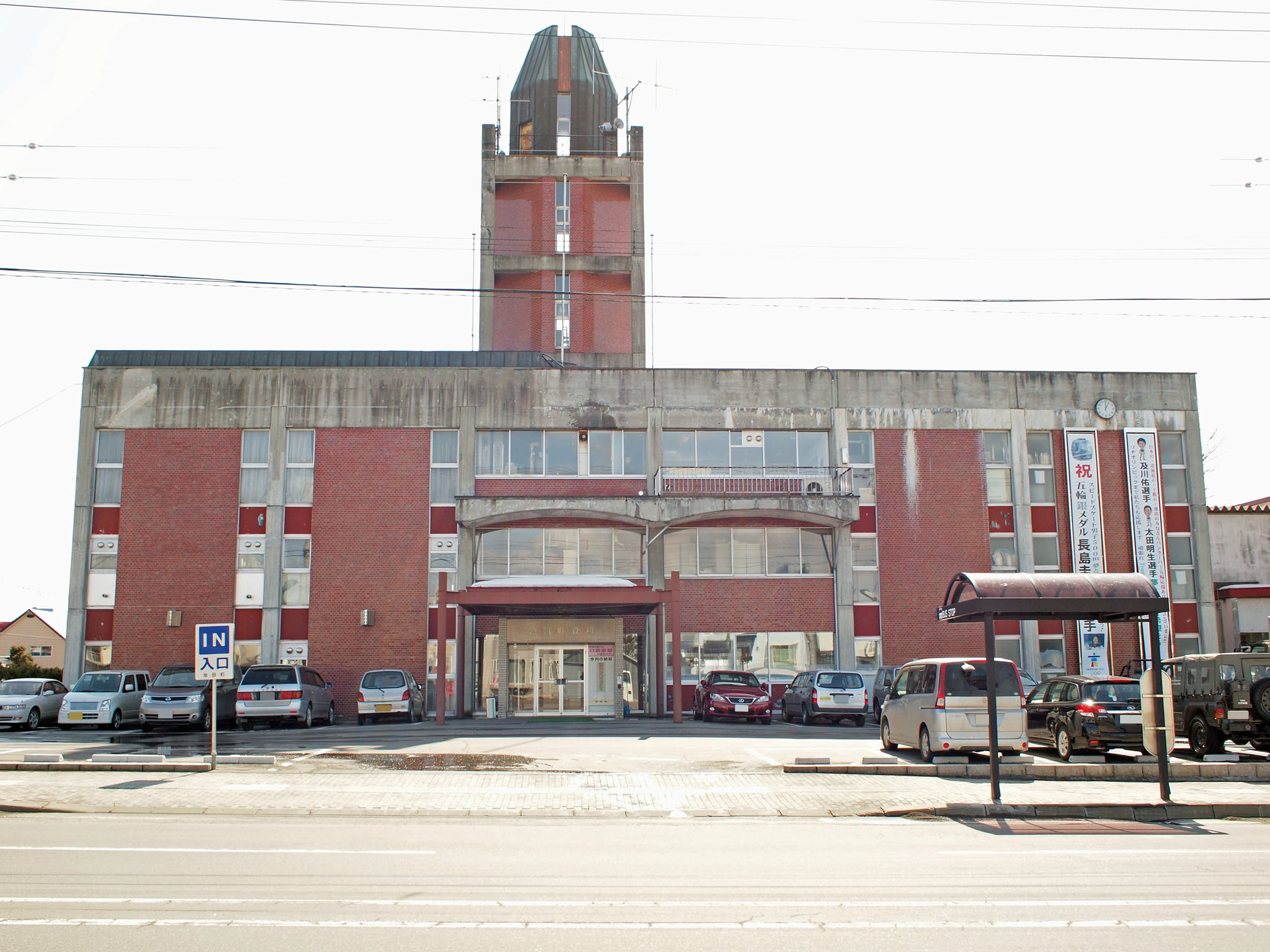
Ikeda Town Hall

Ikeda (池田町, Ikeda-chō) is a town located in Tokachi Subprefecture, Hokkaidō, Japan. As of 31 October 2025, the town had an estimated population of 5,773 in 3172 households, and a population density of 15.5 people per km^{2}. The total area of the town is 371.79 km^{2} (143.55 sq mi).

== Geography ==
Ikeda is located in easternTokachi Subprefecture, on the eastern edge of the Tokachi Plain. The town has a lot of flat land and no prominent mountains. The Tokachi River flows along the border with Makubetsu Town to the southwest, and its tributary, the Tobetsu River, runs north–south through the center of the town. Before the Tokachi River's course was diverted, it merged with the Tobetsu River near the center of Ikeda Town, and during the Meiji period it flourished as a river port.

=== Neighboring municipalities ===
- Makubetsu
- Toyokoro
- Honbestu
- Urahoro
- Shihoro
- Otofuke

=== Climate ===
According to the Köppen climate classification, Urahoro has a humid continental climate. It has large temperature differences, including large annual and daily temperature ranges. It receives a lot of snow, and is designated as a heavy snow area. In winter, temperatures below -25 °C are not uncommon, making it extremely cold.

Climate data for 池田（1991 - 2020）
Month	Jan	Feb	Mar	Apr	May	Jun	Jul	Aug	Sep	Oct	Nov	Dec	Year
Record high °C (°F)	6.6 (43.9)	13.1 (55.6)	17.7 (63.9)	31.2 (88.2)	38.8 (101.8)	35.7 (96.3)	37.4 (99.3)	37.1 (98.8)	34.2 (93.6)	28.8 (83.8)	21.6 (70.9)	14.4 (57.9)	38.8 (101.8)
Mean daily maximum °C (°F)	−2.0 (28.4)	−0.7 (30.7)	4.2 (39.6)	11.5 (52.7)	17.2 (63.0)	20.3 (68.5)	23.5 (74.3)	24.8 (76.6)	21.9 (71.4)	15.8 (60.4)	8.3 (46.9)	0.6 (33.1)	12.1 (53.8)
Daily mean °C (°F)	−8.2 (17.2)	−6.9 (19.6)	−1.3 (29.7)	4.9 (40.8)	10.4 (50.7)	14.2 (57.6)	18.0 (64.4)	19.4 (66.9)	16.0 (60.8)	9.3 (48.7)	2.5 (36.5)	−5.0 (23.0)	6.1 (43.0)
Mean daily minimum °C (°F)	−15.4 (4.3)	−14.4 (6.1)	−7.4 (18.7)	−1.2 (29.8)	4.3 (39.7)	9.4 (48.9)	13.9 (57.0)	15.4 (59.7)	11.2 (52.2)	3.4 (38.1)	−2.9 (26.8)	−11.3 (11.7)	0.4 (32.7)
Record low °C (°F)	−28.4 (−19.1)	−27.6 (−17.7)	−23.1 (−9.6)	−11.0 (12.2)	−5.3 (22.5)	−0.9 (30.4)	5.0 (41.0)	4.7 (40.5)	−0.8 (30.6)	−6.5 (20.3)	−15.1 (4.8)	−23.8 (−10.8)	−28.4 (−19.1)
Average precipitation mm (inches)	37.7 (1.48)	26.5 (1.04)	40.0 (1.57)	61.0 (2.40)	87.8 (3.46)	80.5 (3.17)	105.4 (4.15)	135.0 (5.31)	129.2 (5.09)	89.4 (3.52)	49.7 (1.96)	48.8 (1.92)	897.0 (35.31)
Average precipitation days (≥ 1.0 mm)	4.8	4.2	5.4	8.2	9.2	9.0	10.2	11.3	10.1	8.3	6.8	5.7	93.2
Mean monthly sunshine hours	181.2	188.1	221.3	193.2	190.7	160.6	131.2	133.8	147.3	172.8	167.5	165.4	2,053.1

=== Demographics ===
Per Japanese census data, the population of Ikeda has declined in recent decades.

Historical population
Year	Pop.	±%
1970	13,627	—
1980	11,902	−12.7%
1990	9,809	−17.6%
2000	8,710	−11.2%
2010	7,529	−13.6%
2020	6,294	−16.4%

== History ==
Ikeda is said to have been first settled in 1879 by colonists from Yamanashi Prefecture, but organised cultivation began in 1896 with the establishment of Ikeda Farms by Marquess Ikeda Nakahiro, son of former Shogun Tokugawa Yoshinobu and adopted heir to the daimyo of Tottori Domain. In 1926 small villages came together, gaining town status and Ikeda town began.

== Government ==
Ikeda has a mayor-council form of government with a directly elected mayor and a unicameral town council of 12 members. Ikeda, as part of Tokachi Subprefecture, contributes four members to the Hokkaidō Legislative Assembly. In terms of national politics, the town is part of the Hokkaidō 11th district of the lower house of the Diet of Japan.

== Sister city relations ==
- - Penticton, British Columbia, Canada.

== Economy ==
The economy of Ikeda is centered on agriculture.The main industry in Ikeda is producing Tokachi wine. Field crops are primarily beans, such as kidney beans and adzuki beans, as well as sugar beets and potatoes. Vegetable cultivation, such as onions and nebalister, is also increasing. Beef cattle are the primary livestock, but dairy farming is also practiced.

== Education ==
Ikeda has one public elementary school and one public middle school operated by the town government. The town has one public high school operated by the Hokkaido Board of Education.

== Transportation ==
Ikeda is relatively well connected to the rest of Hokkaido by public transport. The Super Ozora express train between Sapporo and Kushiro stops in Ikeda. Therefore, Ikeda has express train links to Sapporo, Chitose, Obihiro and Kushiro. This is especially convenient for accessing New Chitose Airport. There are also local trains to Obihiro (30 mins) and Kushiro (2 hours). The town is also connected to North East Tokachi by local bus which travels between Obihiro and Rikubetsu. By car route 38 is useful for accessing Obihiro and the highway to Sapporo is useful for longer journeys.

=== Railways ===
JR Hokkaido - Nemuro Main Line

■ Toshibetsu - Ikeda

=== Highways ===
- Dōtō Expressway
- National Route 242

== Local attractions ==
Ikeda has almost year-round blue skies, which results in warm summers and cold winters. In the summer, temperatures reach 30 degrees Celsius and in winter up to minus 30 degrees Celsius. The clear skies in winter make perfect ice skating conditions, and Ikeda is known for producing world class speed skaters. In the 2010 Winter Olympics in Vancouver, a speed skater from Ikeda won a silver medal for Japan.

- Ikeda Wine Castle - The wine castle houses local Tokachi wines and shows visitors the wine making process. One can also taste the local wines or grape juice produced there. The castle also offers a large shop with many different local foods, drinks and crafts from Tokachi and Hokkaido and a restaurant overlooking the town. Every October Ikeda holds its annual wine festival, drawing visitors from all over Hokkaido. It is Ikeda's main event of the year.
- Happiness Dairy, a local cheese and ice cream producer. One can see the dairy making process here, or taste the delicious ice cream at the end of the process. The dairy farm is so popular it has been renamed by locals as "Happiness Daily".
- "Makiba no ie" a campsite with log cabins available for rent about 2 kilometres from the station. It also has an Italian restaurant which uses local Ikeda produce. In the summer there is also an outside cafe, play area for children and sheepdog shows.
- "Spinners Farm" a sheep farm where one can learn to spin his or her own wool or take a wool weaving workshop. Spinners Farm sells good quality wool and local crafts and occasionally also holds art exhibitions. Nearby to Spinners Farm is Moonface Cafe, a cafe and art gallery serving coffee and light lunches. There are also often art exhibitions held there.

=== Winter Activities ===
As the winter is long in Hokkaido, there are many winter activities to keep the locals busy. As the weather maintains good ice skating conditions, there are local free ice skating rinks in the town. There is also an ice curling rink next to the town's community hall. In nearby Makubetsu (5 km) there is a small ski hill. Larger ski hills such as Sahoro and Tomamu are further away in the Hidaka mountains, but by the expressway they are accessible in under an hour.

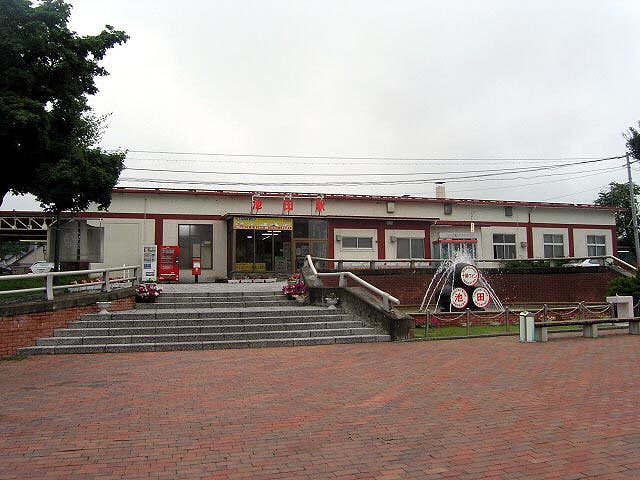
Ikeda railway station

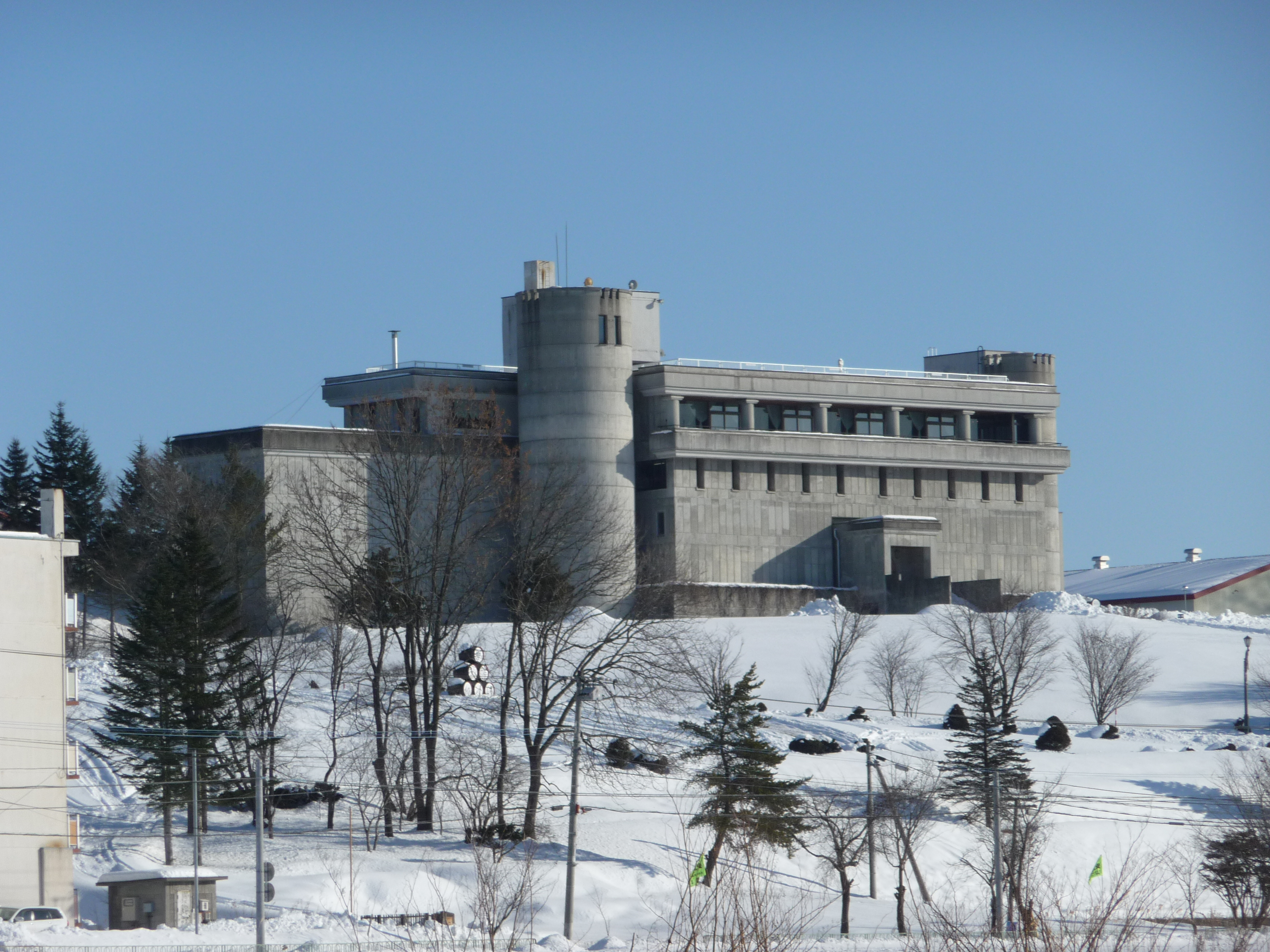
Ikeda Winery

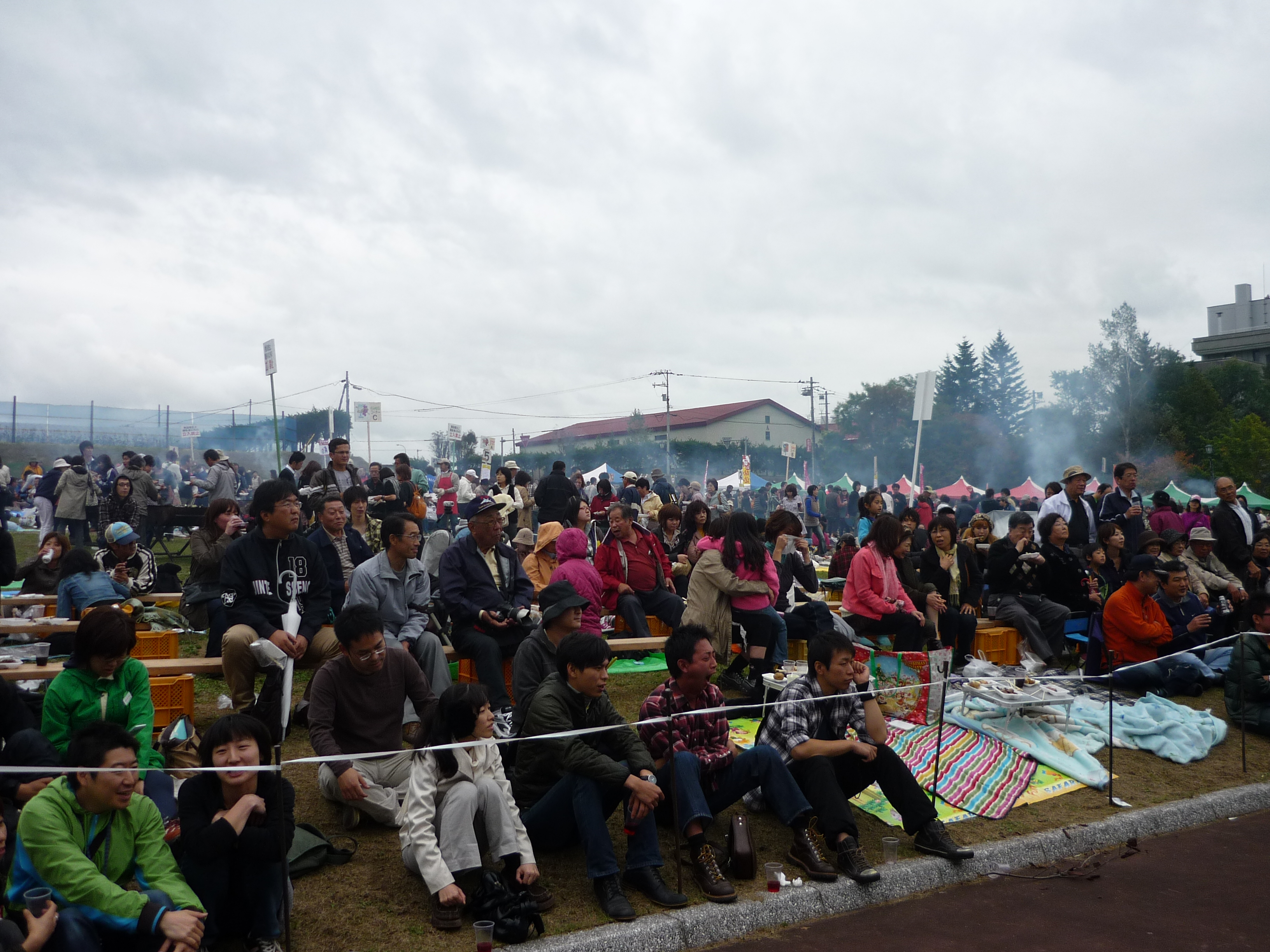
People of Ikeda

== Noted people from Ikeda ==
- Kaneyasu Marutani, politician
- Miwa Yoshida, musician
- Kazuhiko Shimamoto, manga artist
- Shūhō Satō, manga artist
