= Anebetsu Station =

Railway station in Hamanaka, Hokkaido, Japan

Anebetsu Station 姉別駅
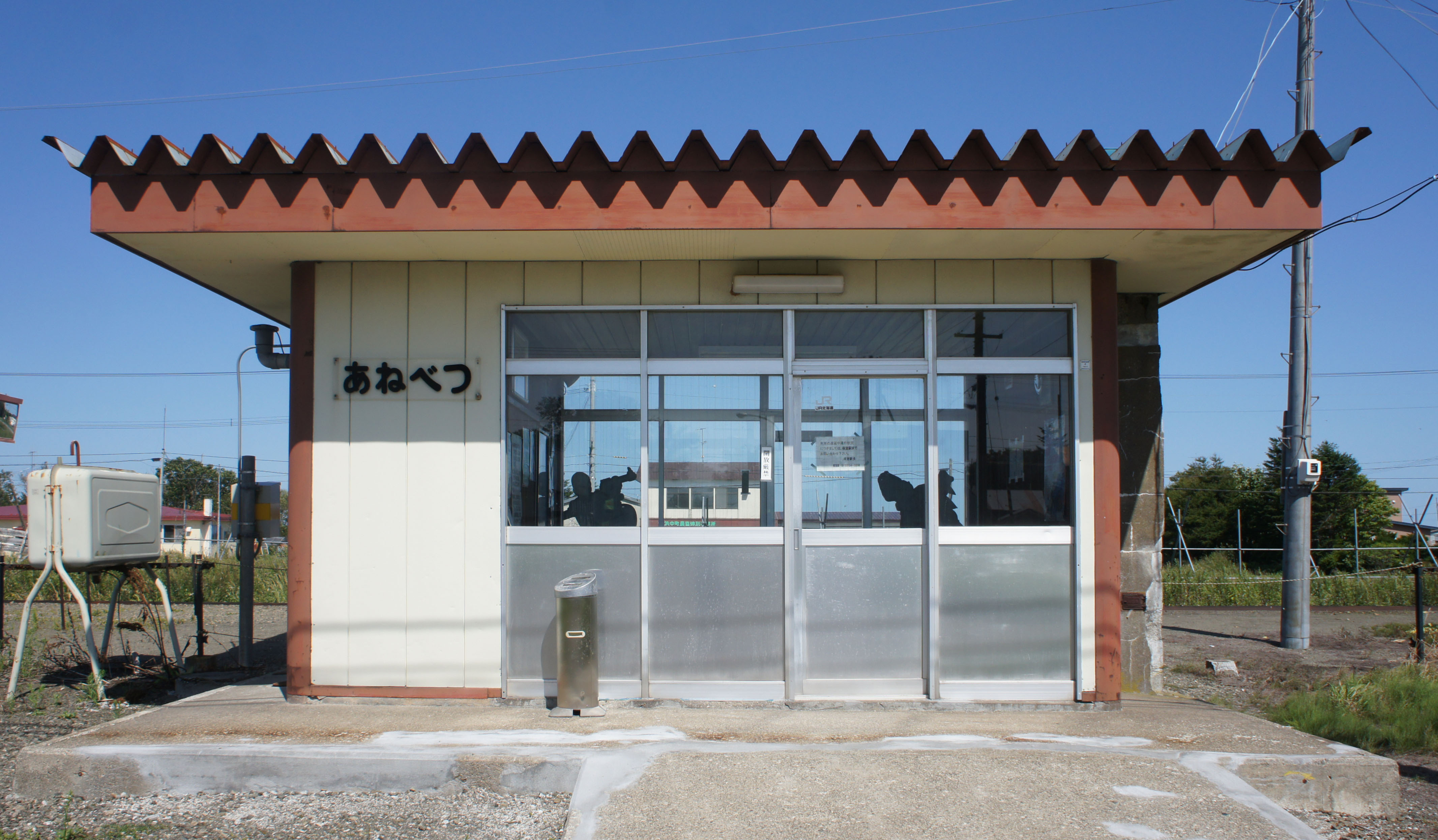
- The station building in September 2018

General information
- Location: 3-50 Anebetsu, Hamanaka-cho, Akkeshi-gun, Hokkaido; Japan
- Coordinates: 43°11′46.25″N 145°11′42.2″E
- System: regional rail
- Operator: JR Hokkaido
- Line: Nemuro Main Line
- Distance: 256.0 km from Shintoku
- Platforms: 1 side platform
- Tracks: 1

Construction
- Structure type: At-grade
- Accessible: No

Other information
- Status: Unattended
- Website: Official website

History
- Opened: 25 November 1919

Passengers
- FY2022: 3 daily

Services
Preceding station	JR Hokkaido	Following station
Attoko towards Takikawa	Nemuro Main Line Local	Hamanaka towards Nemuro
Location
- Location within Hokkaido Location within Japan

Anebetsu Station (姉別駅, Anebetsu-eki) is a railway station located in the town of Hamanaka, Hokkaidō, Japan.

== Lines ==
The station is served by the Hanasaku Line portion of the Nemuro Main Line, and lies 256.0 km from the starting point of the line at Shintoku.

== Layout ==
Anebetsu Station has one side platform serving one track, on the right hand side towards Nemuro. It has a waiting room with the same design as Shin-Yoshino Station. The station is unattended.

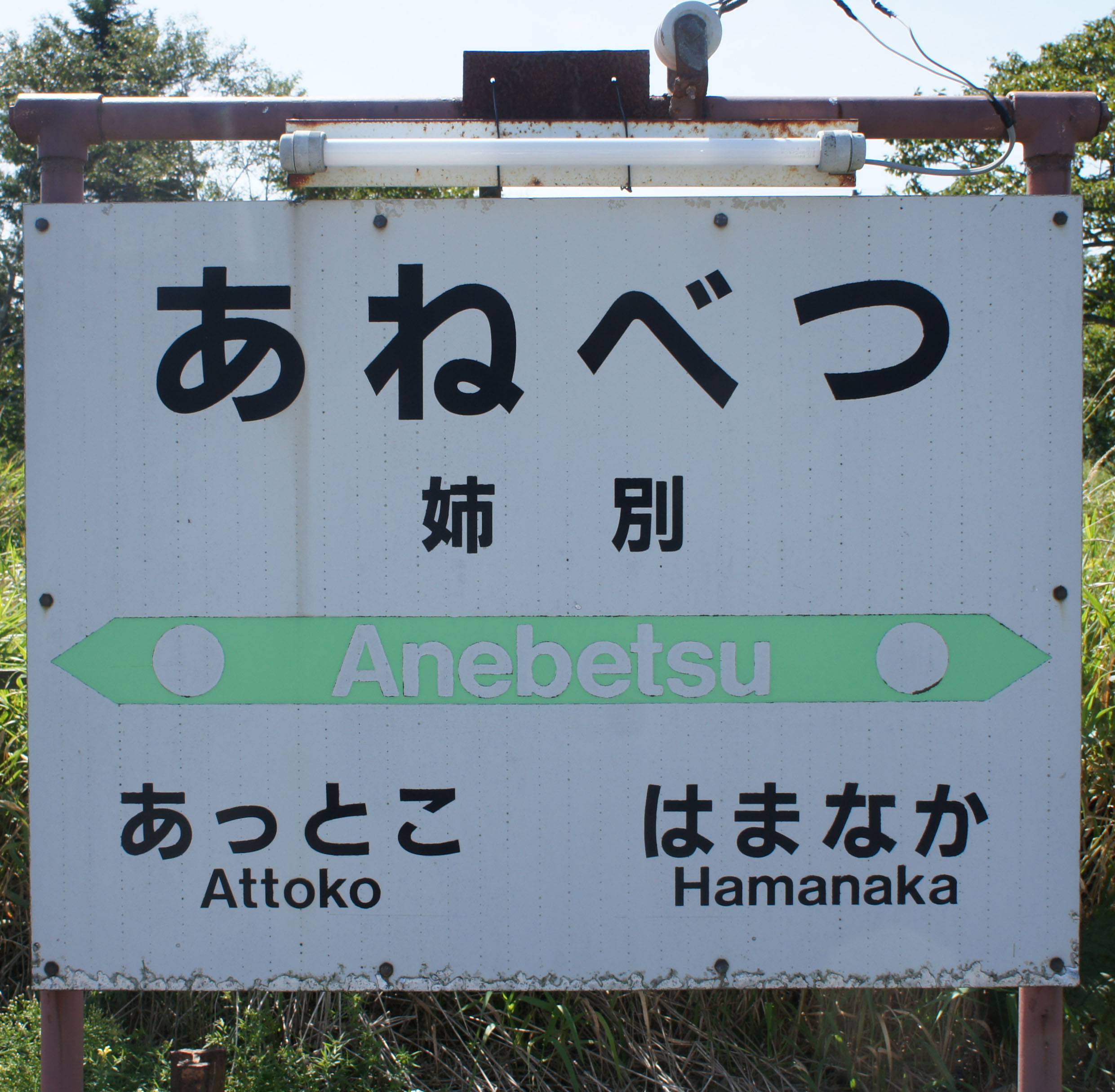
Signboard

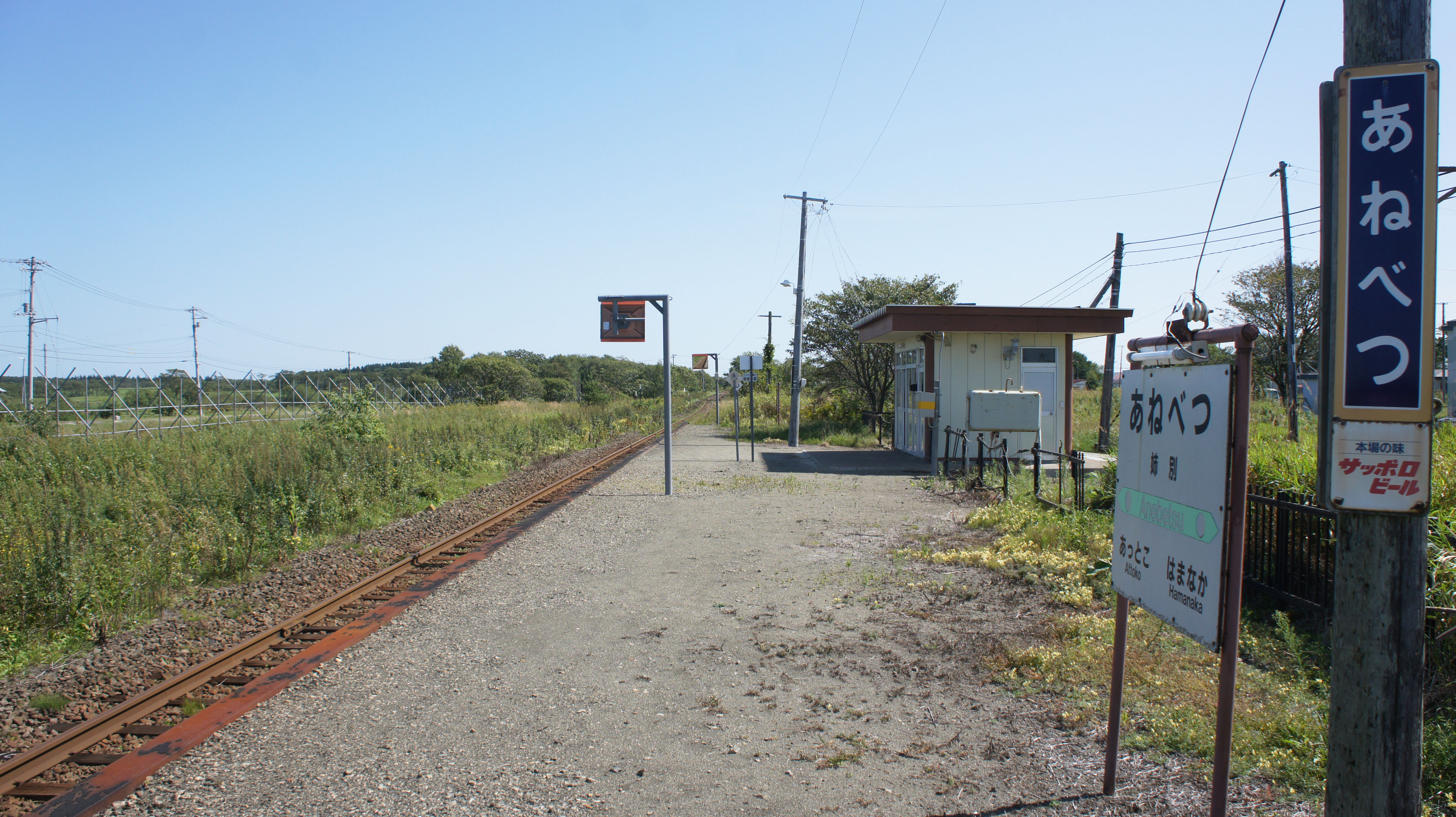
Platform

== History ==
The station opened on 25 November 1919 with the extension of the Ministry of Railways' Kushiro Main Line (later Nemuro Main Line) between Akkeshi Station and Attoko Station. Following the privatization of the Japanese National Railways on 1 April 1987, the station came under the control of JR Hokkaido. A new side platform was added on 22 March 1989.

== Passenger statistics ==
In fiscal 2022, the station was used by an average of 4 passengers daily.

== Surrounding area ==
- Hokkaido Prefectural Route 988
- Hamanaka Town Anebetsu Minami Elementary and Junior High School

== See also ==
- List of railway stations in Japan
