= Chanai Station =

Railway station in Hamanaka, Hokkaido, Japan

Chanai Station 茶内駅
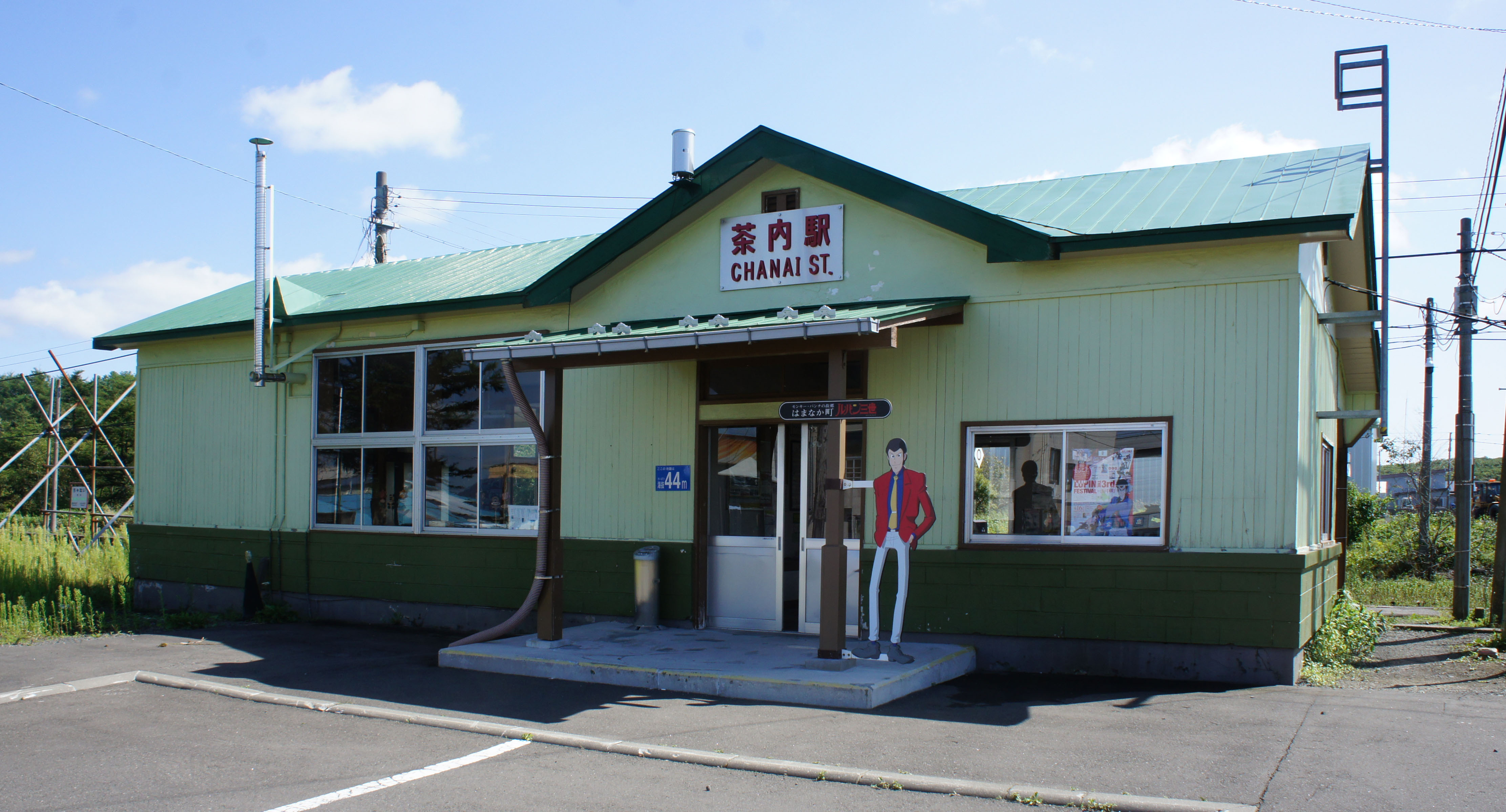
- The station building in September 2018

General information
- Location: 1113 Chanai Midori, Hamanaka-cho, Akkeshi-gun, Hokkaido; Japan
- Coordinates: 43°7′45.41″N 145°1′40.79″E
- System: regional rail
- Operator: JR Hokkaido
- Line: Nemuro Main Line
- Distance: 238.9 km from Shintoku
- Platforms: 2 side platforms
- Tracks: 3

Construction
- Structure type: At-grade
- Accessible: No

Other information
- Status: Unattended
- Website: Official website

History
- Opened: 25 November 1919

Passengers
- FY2022: 13 daily

Services
Preceding station	JR Hokkaido	Following station
Hamanaka towards Takikawa	Nemuro Main Line Local	Akkeshi towards Nemuro
Location
- Location within Hokkaido Location within Japan

Chanai Station (茶内駅, Chanai-eki) is a railway station located in the town of Hamanaka, Hokkaidō, Japan.

== Lines ==
The station is served by the Hanasaku Line segment of the Nemuro Main Line, and lies 238.9 km from the starting point of the line at Shintoku .

== Layout ==
Chanai Station has two opposing side platform serving two tracks. It has a wooden station building, with platform 1 located on the side of the building, and a waiting room at platform 2. Another siding is located across platform 2, which is used for track maintenance. Both platforms have level crossings. The station building, originally staffed, has been restored and is still in use. The former station office is now the "Fure Chaukan" exhibition corner for Hamanaka Town, where photographs and documents related to the Hamanaka Municipal Railway are on display. Hamanaka Town, where this station is located, is the hometown of Monkey Punch, known for the manga "Lupin the Third," and life-size panels of Lupin and other characters are displayed at the station. The station is unattended.

=== Platforms ===
1	■ Nemuro Main Line	for Nemuro
2	■ Nemuro Main Line	for Kushiro

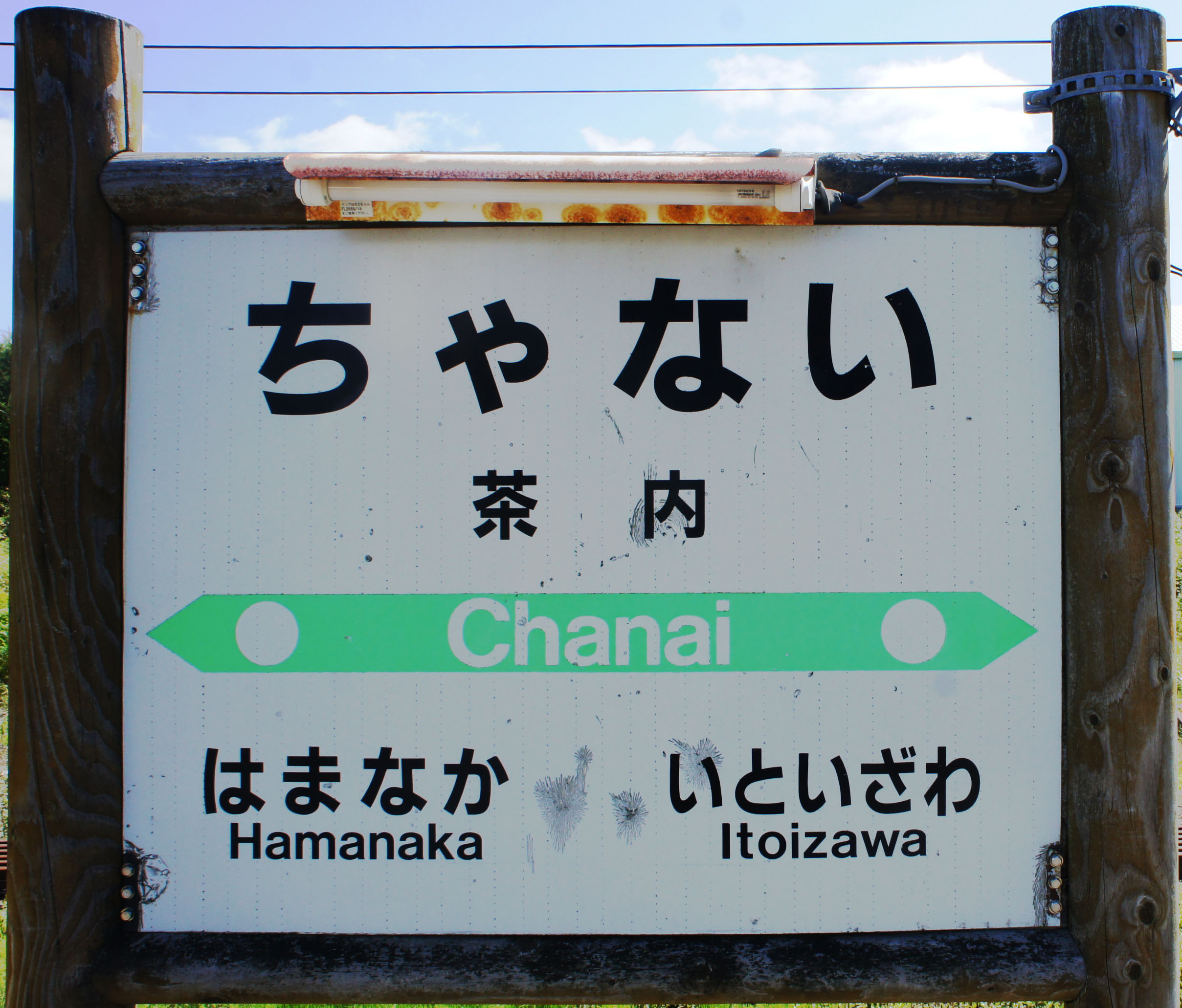
Signboard

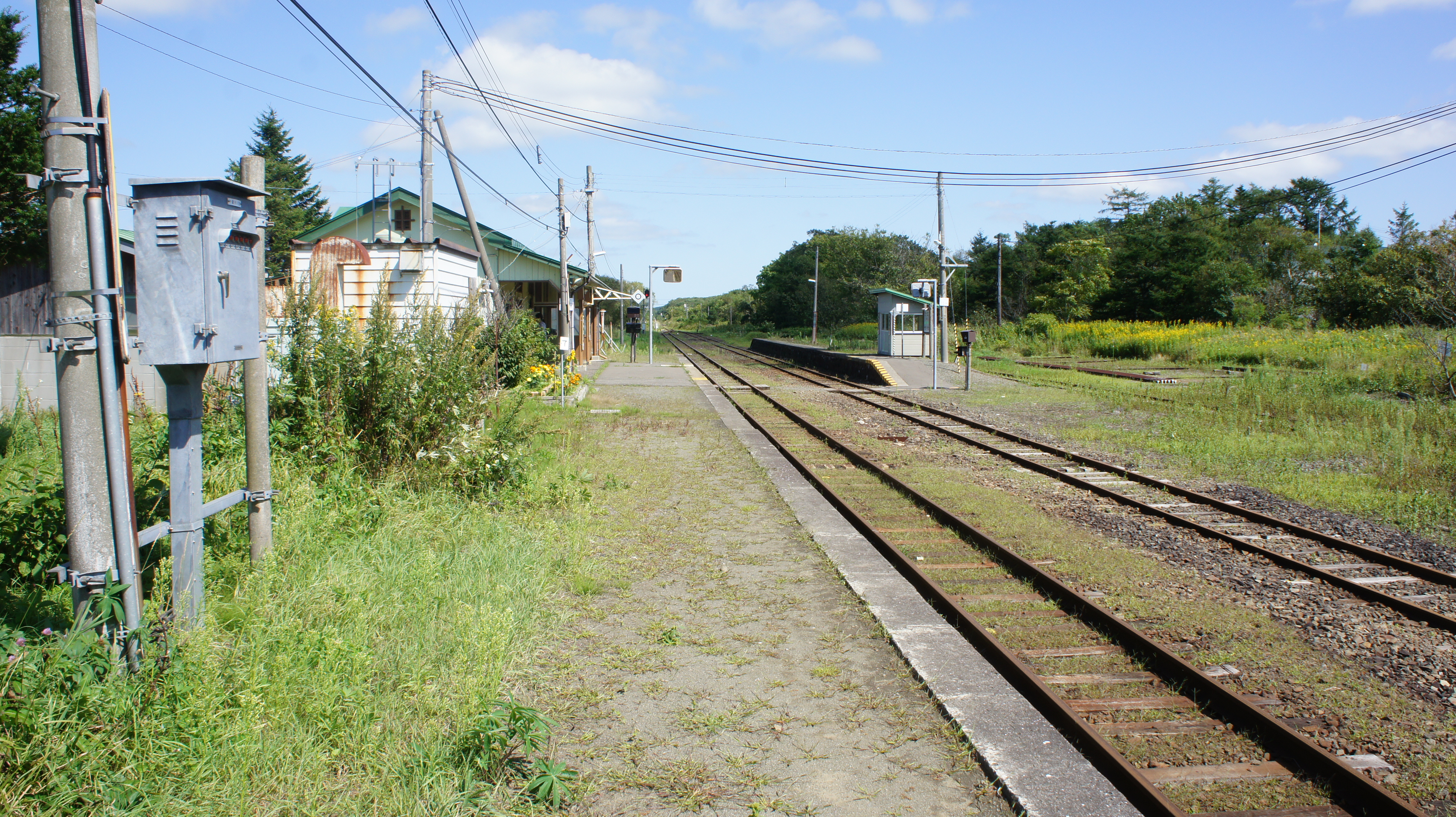
Platform

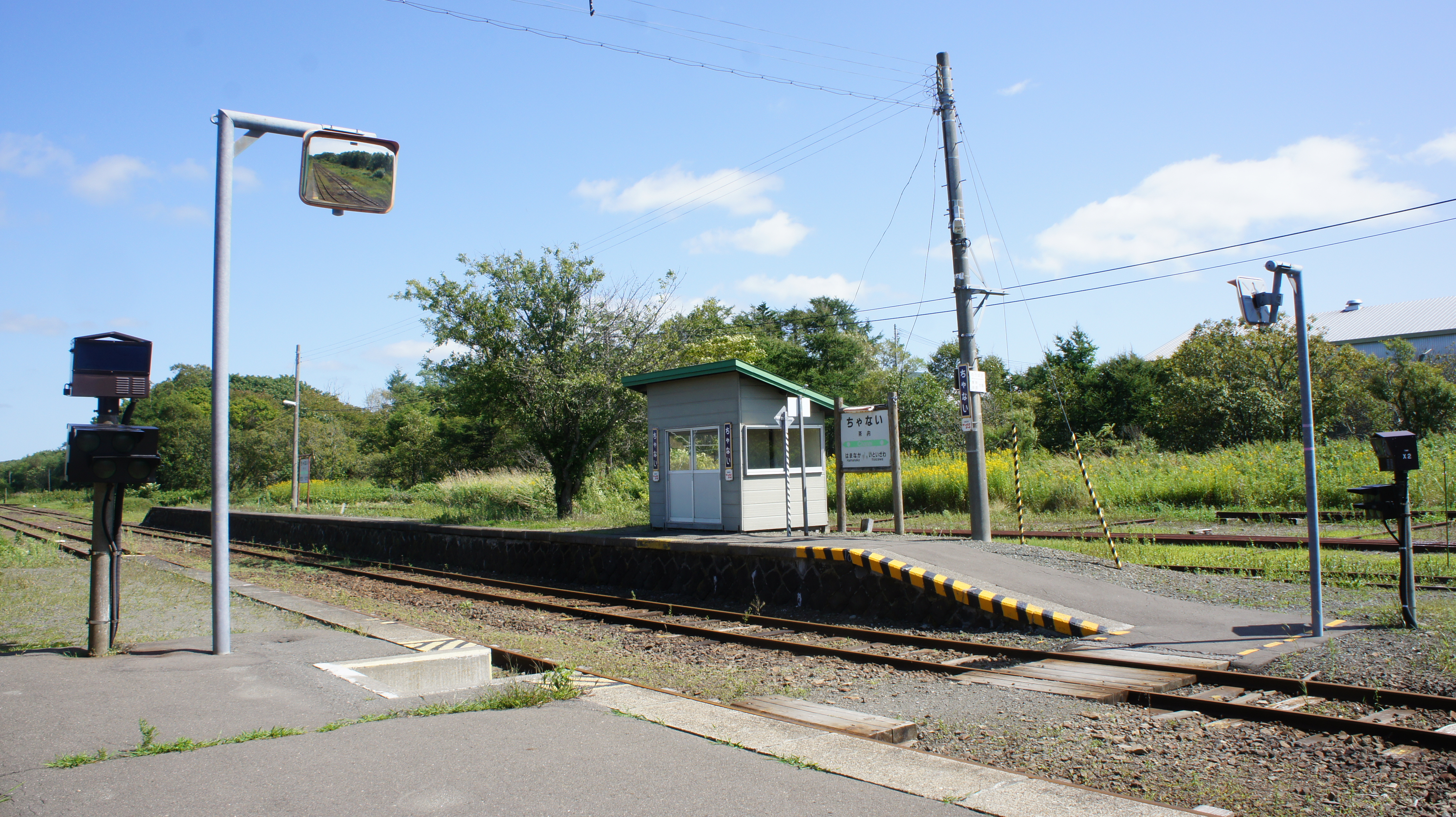
Platform and Level crossing

== History ==
The station opened on 25 November 1919 with the extension of the Ministry of Railways Kushiro Main Line (later Nemuro Main Line) between Akkeshi Station and Attoko Station. The station building was remodeled in March 1950. Following the privatization of the Japanese National Railways on 1 April 1987, the station came under the control of JR Hokkaido. A new side platform was added on 22 March 1989. }.

Until 1972, the station housed the office and depot for the 762 mm gauge Chanai Line (Hamanaka Town Railway), which connected Nishien-Shubetsu in the remote area, Bekambeushi in Akkeshi Town, and Kamifuren in Betsukai Town (Betsukai Village at the time of operation).

== Passenger statistics ==
In fiscal 2022, the station was used by an average of 13 passengers daily.

== Surrounding area ==
The area in front of the station is a relatively large urban area centered around the Chanai Excellent Shopping District.

- Hamanaka Town Chanai Joint Government Building (Chanai Sakae)
- Hamanaka Town Hall Chanai Branch

== See also ==
- List of railway stations in Japan
