= Kami-Oboro Station =

Railway station in Akkeshi, Hokkaido, Japan

Kami-Oboro Station 上尾幌駅
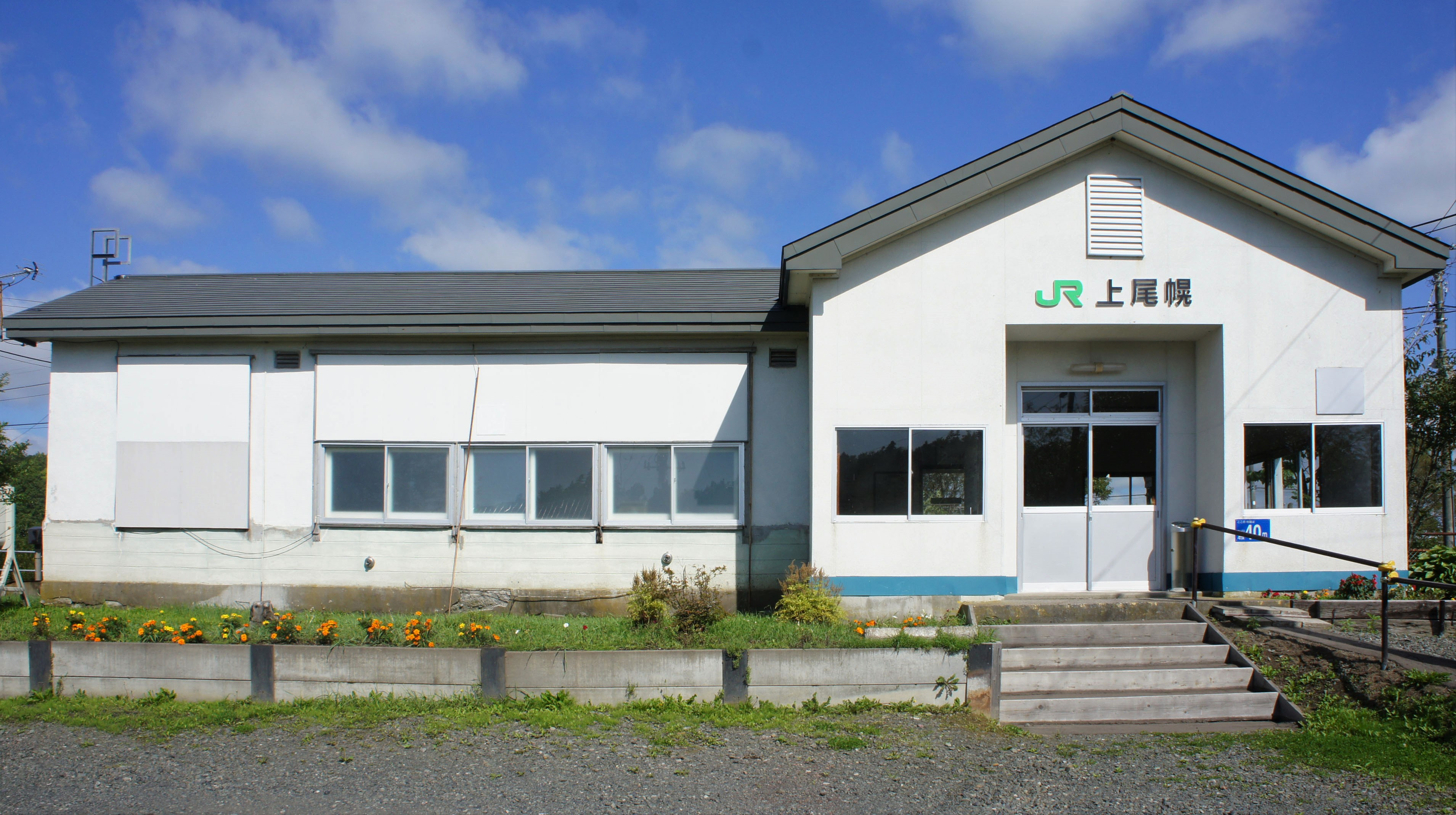
- The station building in September 2018

General information
- Location: 1-Kami-Oboro, Akkeshi-cho, Akkeshi-gun, Hokkaido 088-0771; Japan
- Coordinates: 43°1′58.47″N 144°36′44.71″E
- System: regional rail
- Operator: JR Hokkaido
- Line: Nemuro Main Line
- Distance: 195.4 km from Shintoku
- Platforms: 1 side+ 1 island platform
- Tracks: 1

Other information
- Status: Unattended
- Website: Official website

History
- Opened: 1 December 1917

Passengers
- FY2022: 4 daily

Services
| Preceding station | JR Hokkaido | Following station |
|---|---|---|
| Beppo towards Takikawa | Nemuro Main Line Local | Oboro towards Nemuro |
Location
- Location within Hokkaido Location within Japan

Kami-Oboro Station (上尾幌駅, Kami-Oboro-eki) is a railway station located in the town of Akkeshi, Hokkaidō, Japan.

== Lines ==
The station is served by the Hanasaku Line portion of the Nemuro Main Line, and lies 195.4 km from the starting point of the line at Shintoku.

== Layout ==
Kami-Oboro Station has one Island platform and one side platform, serving 2 tracks. The platforms are staggered, and are connected by a level crossing.

The station is unattended.

=== Platforms ===
| 1 | ■ Nemuro Main Line | for Asahikawa |
| 2 | ■ Nemuro Main Line | for Nemuro and Akkeshi |

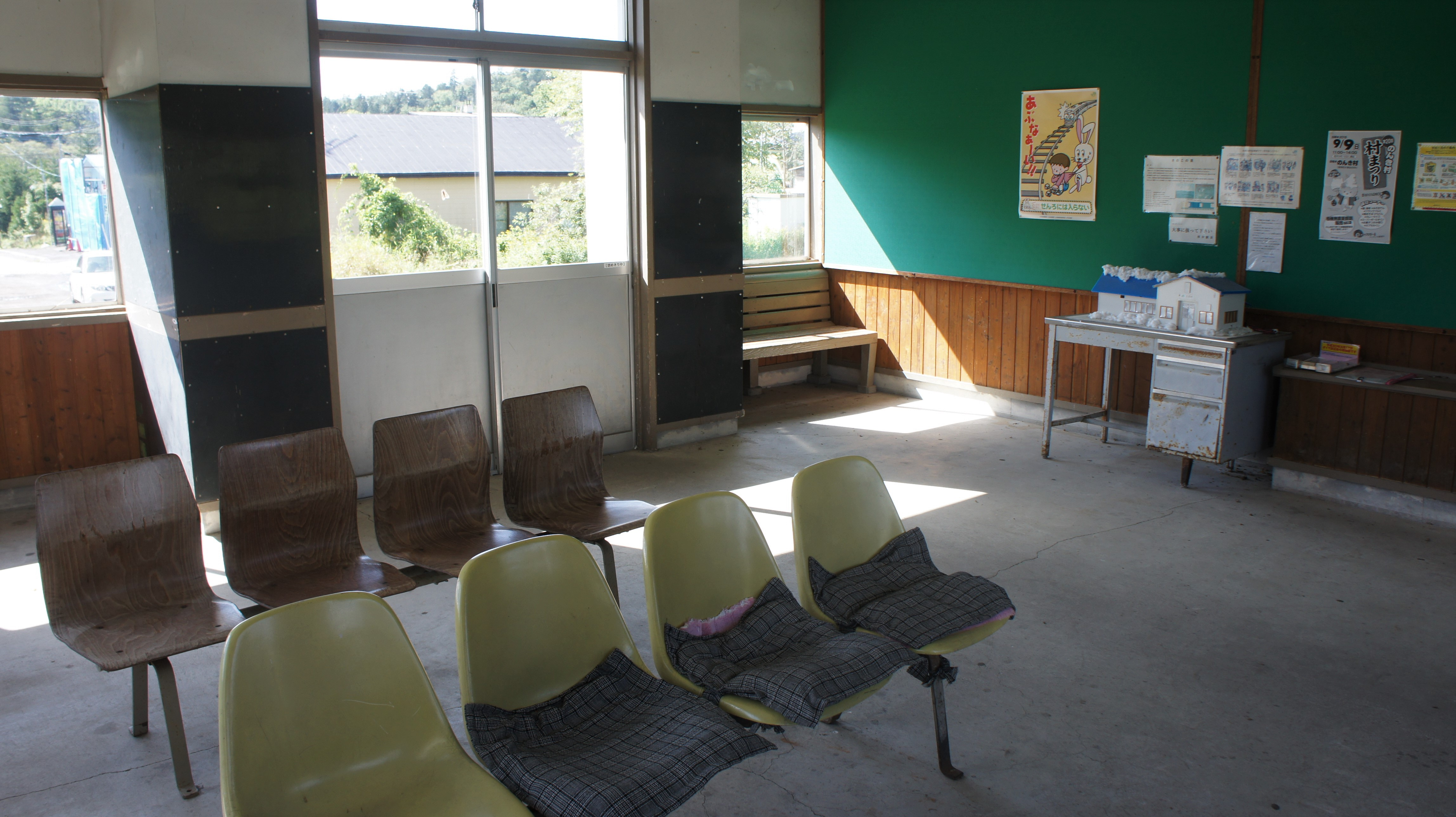
Waiting Room

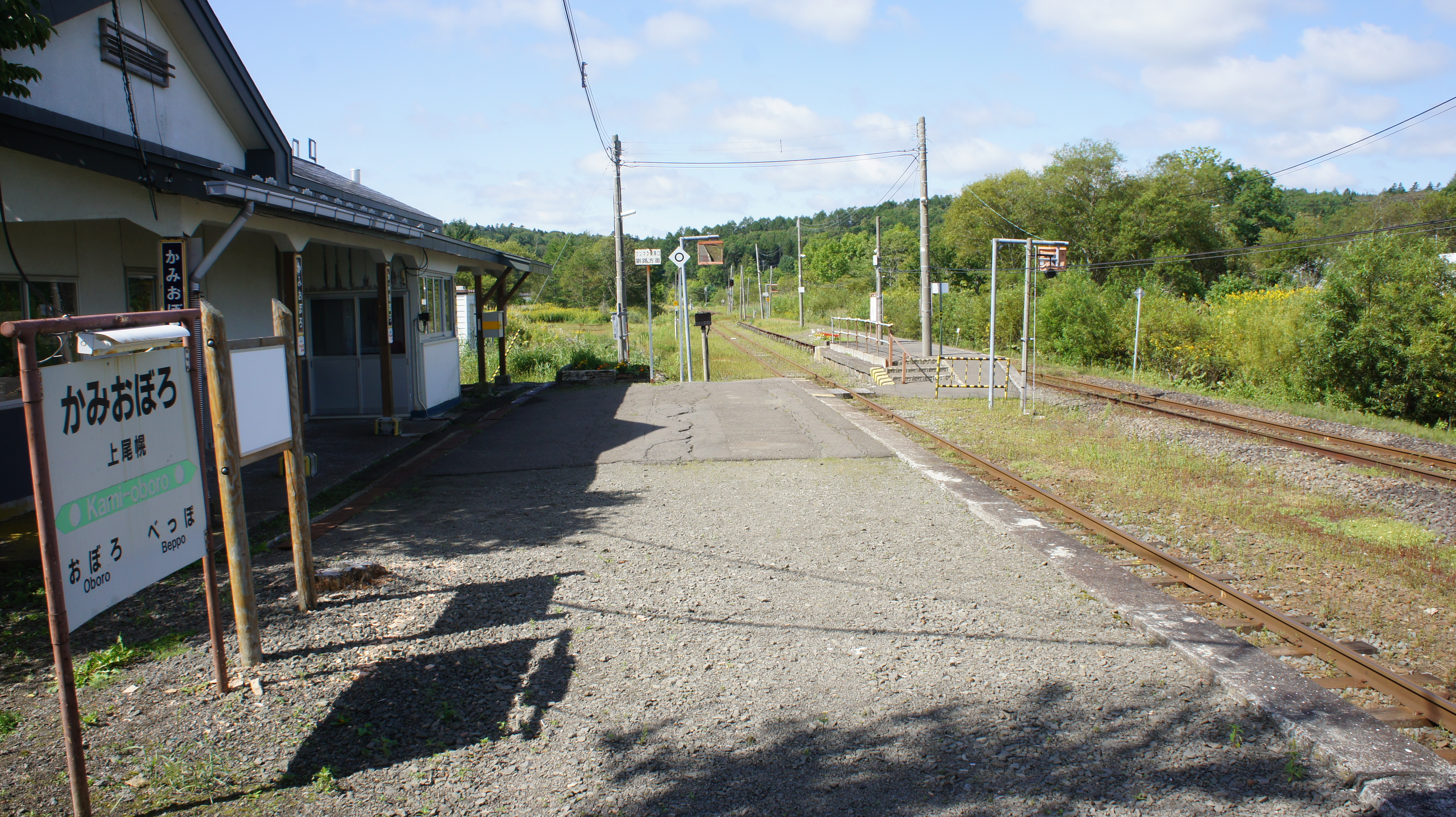
Platform

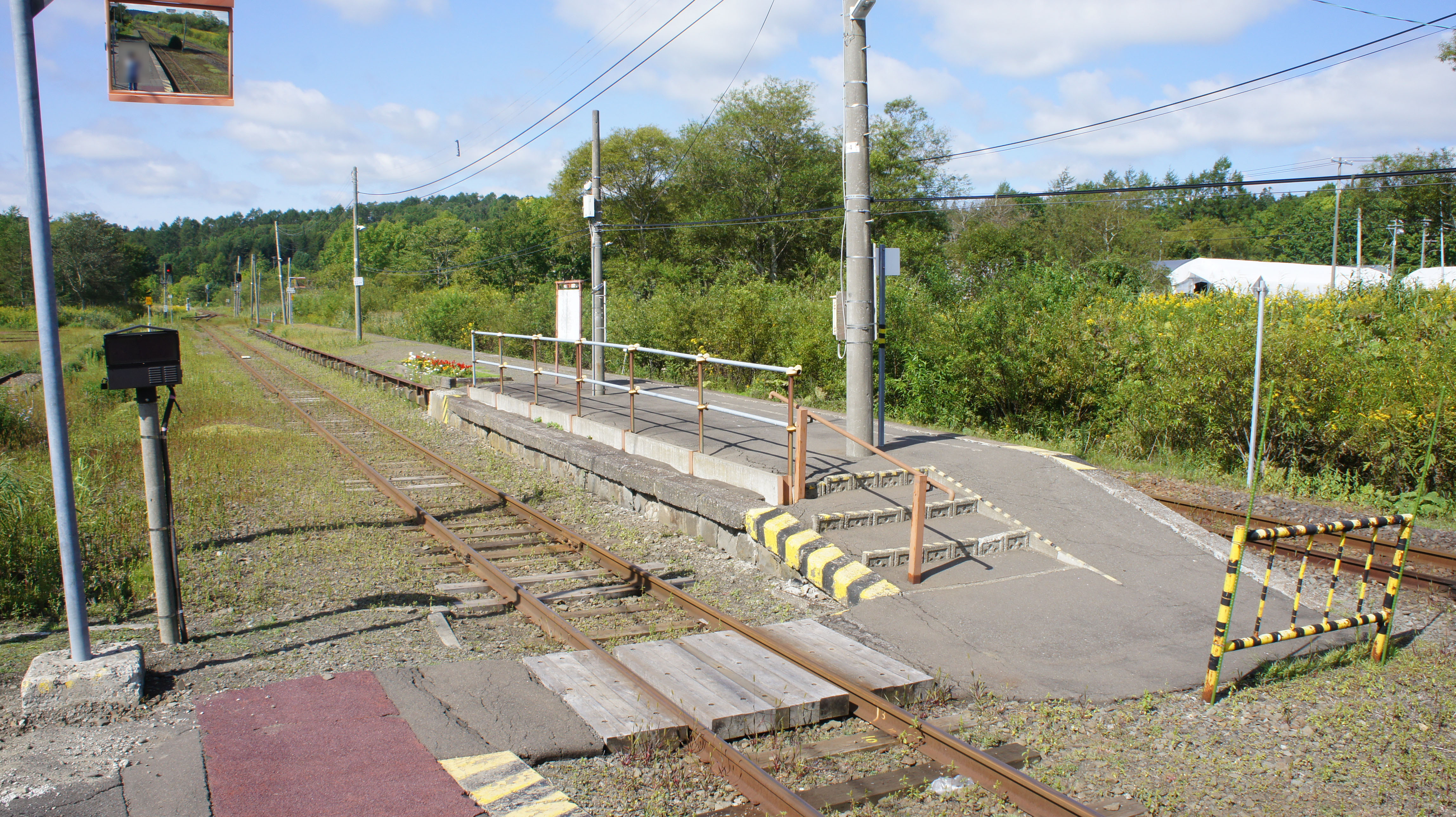
Level crossing

== History ==
The station opened on 1 December 1917 with the extension of the Ministry of Railways Kushiro Main Line (later Nemuro Main Line) between Kushiro Station and Hama-Akkeshi Station. The current station building was constructed in December 1935. Following the privatization of the Japanese National Railways on 1 April 1987, the station came under the control of JR Hokkaido. A new side platform was added on 22 March 1989.

== Passenger statistics ==
In fiscal 2022, the station was used by an average of 4 passengers daily.

== Surrounding area ==
- Japan National Route 44

== See also ==
- List of railway stations in Japan
