= Monshizu Station =

Railway station in Akkeshi, Hokkaido, Japan

Monshizu Station 門静駅
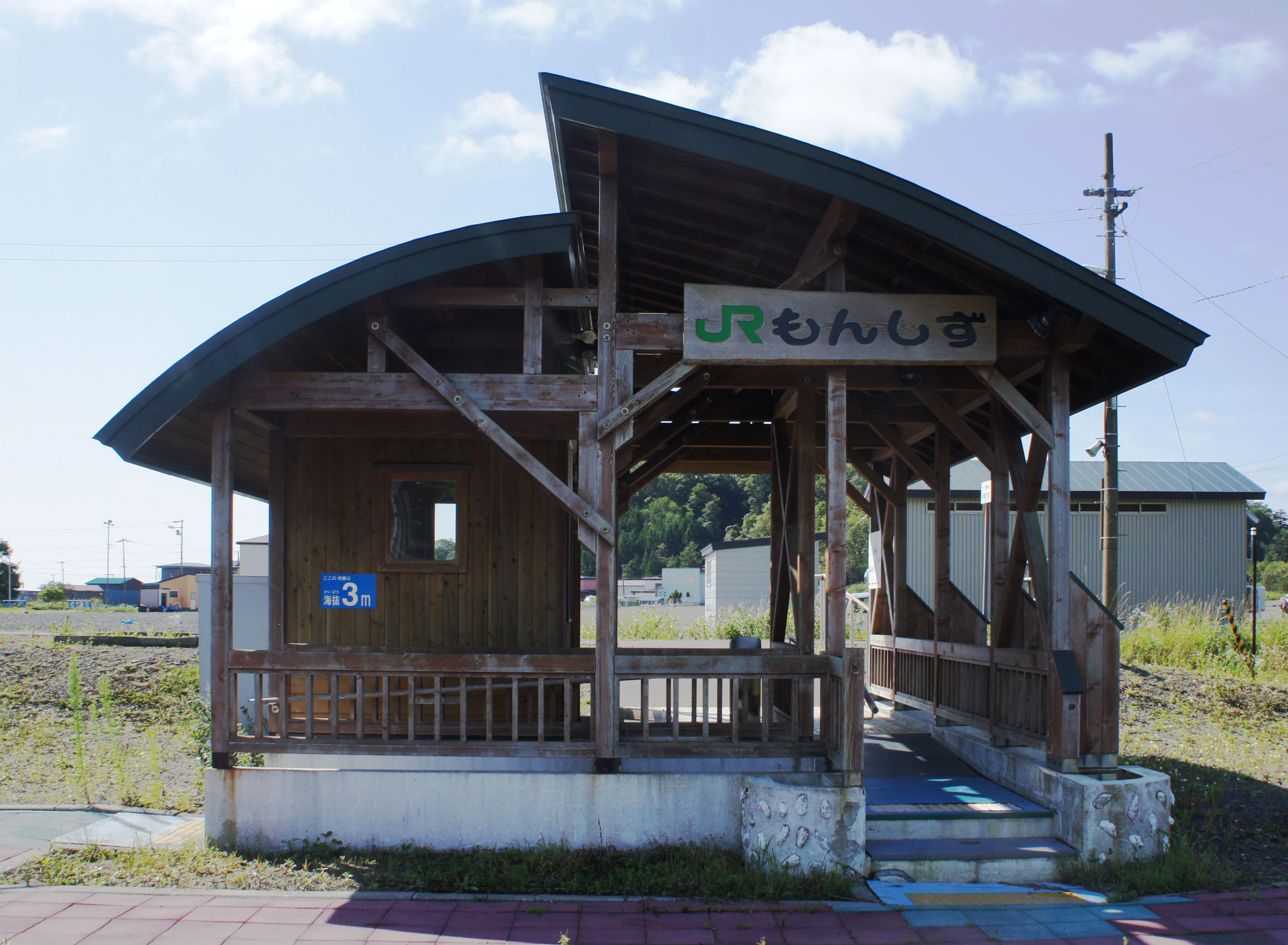
- The station building in September 2018

General information
- Location: Monshizu 3-chome, Akkeshi-chō, Akkeshi-gun, Hokkaido 088-1126; Japan
- Coordinates: 43°3′27.2″N 144°46′57.82″E
- System: regional rail
- Operator: JR Hokkaido
- Line: Nemuro Main Line
- Distance: 213.8 km from Shintoku
- Platforms: 1 side platform
- Tracks: 1

Other information
- Status: Unattended
- Website: Official website

History
- Opened: 1 December 1917

Passengers
- FY2022: 9 daily

Services
Preceding station	JR Hokkaido	Following station
Oboro towards Takikawa	Nemuro Main Line Local	Akkeshi towards Nemuro
Location
- Location within Hokkaido Location within Japan

Monshizu Station (門静駅, Monshizu-eki) is a railway station located in the town of Akkeshi, Hokkaidō, Japan. It is operated by JR Hokkaido.

== Lines ==
The station is served by the Hanasaku Line portion of the Nemuro Main Line, and lies 213.8 km from the starting point of the line at Shintoku .

== Layout ==
Monshizu Station has a single side platform. It was originally an island platform interchange station with a dedicated spur line qhich branched off from the station to ship ballast for track maintenance from a quarry located two kilometers northeast.

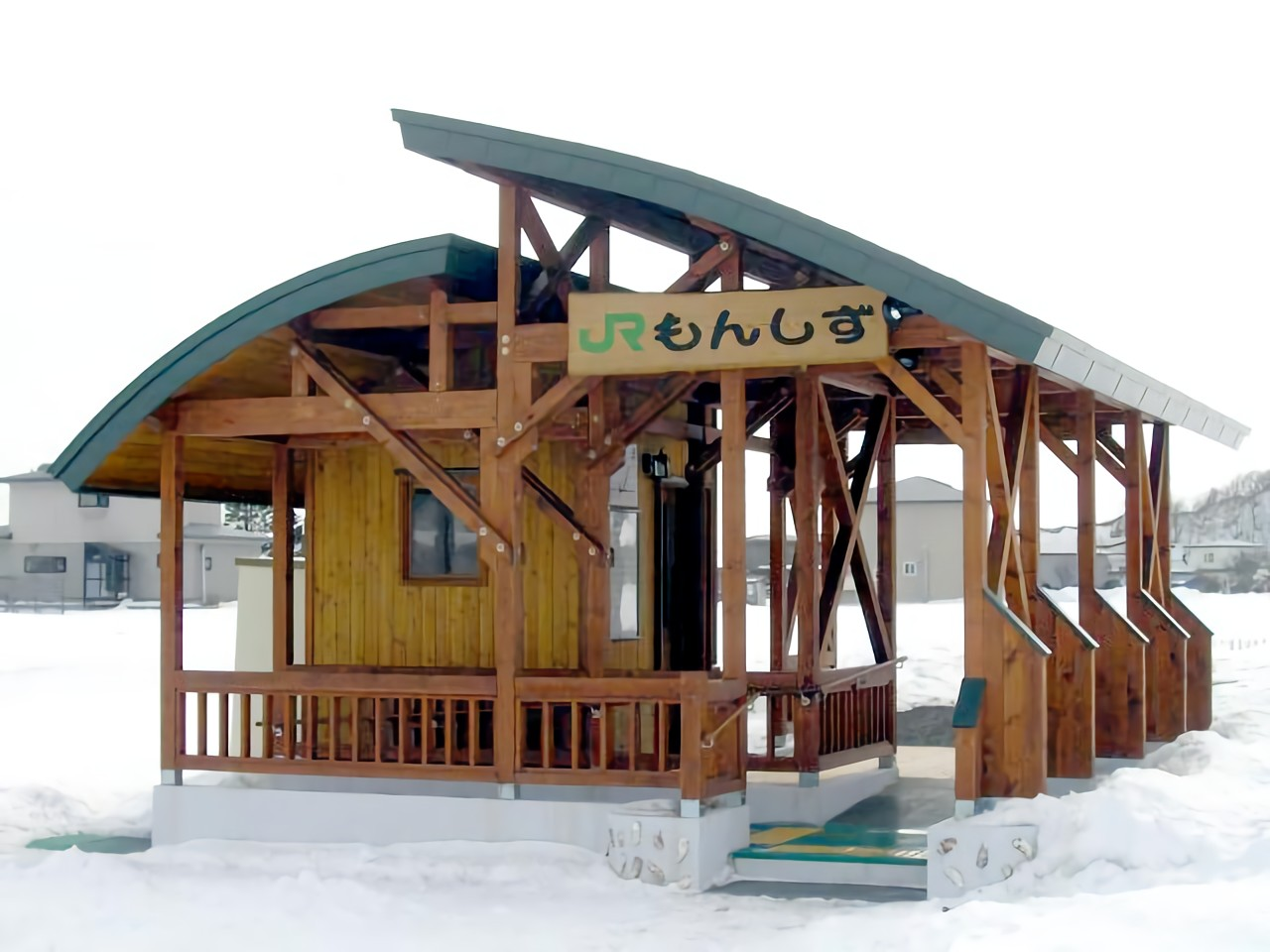
Staton building in winter

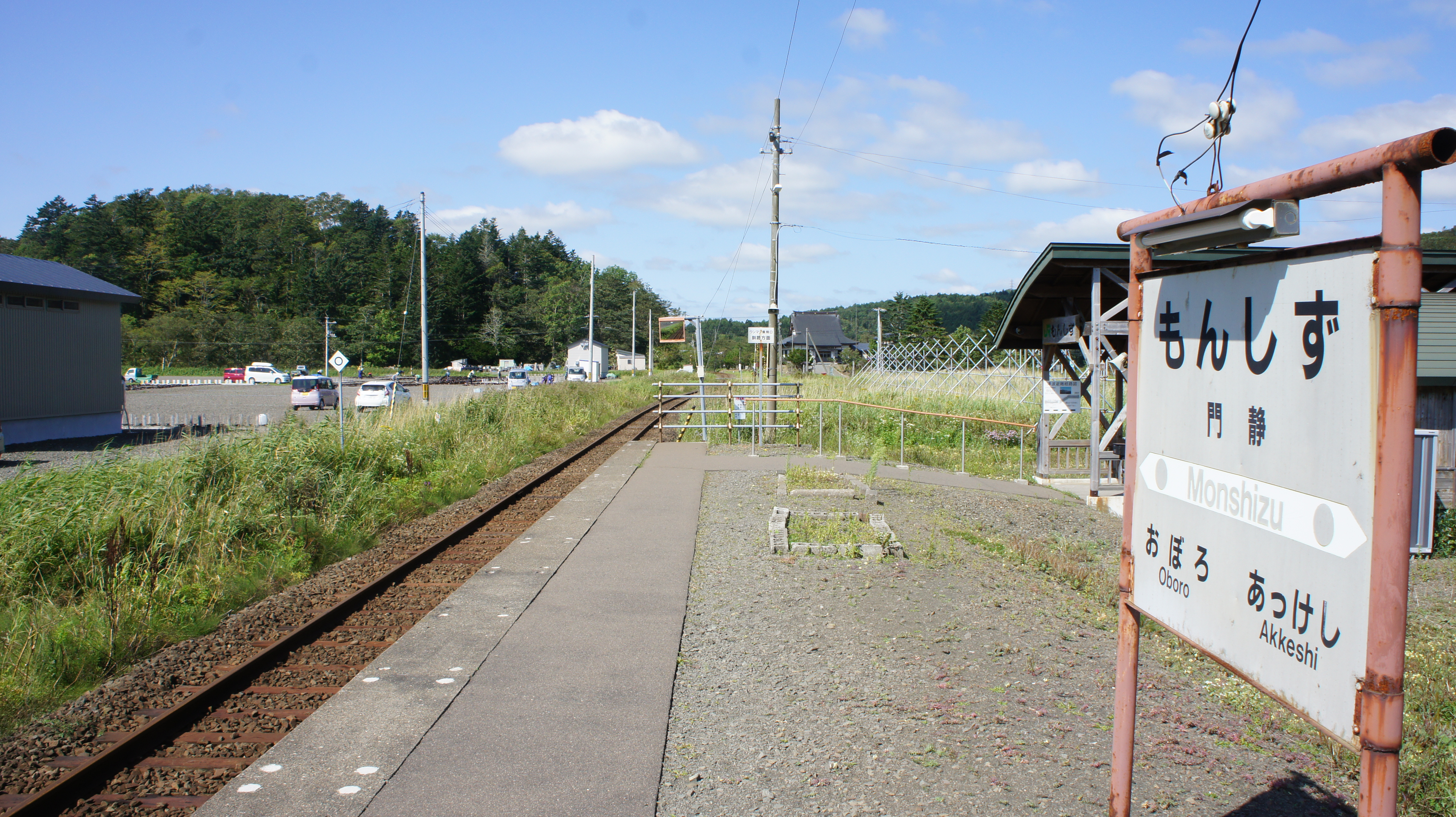
Platform

== History ==
The station opened on 1 December 1917 with the extension of the Ministry of Railways Kushiro Main Line (later Nemuro Main Line) between Kushiro Station and Hama-Akkeshi Station. Following the privatization of the Japanese National Railways on 1 April 1987, the station came under the control of JR Hokkaido. A new side platform was added on 22 March 1989.

== Passenger statistics ==
In fiscal 2022, the station was used by an average of 9 passengers daily.

== Surrounding area ==
- Japan National Route 44

== See also ==
- List of railway stations in Japan
