= Beppo Station =

Railway station in Kushiro town, Hokkaido, Japan

Beppo Station 別保駅
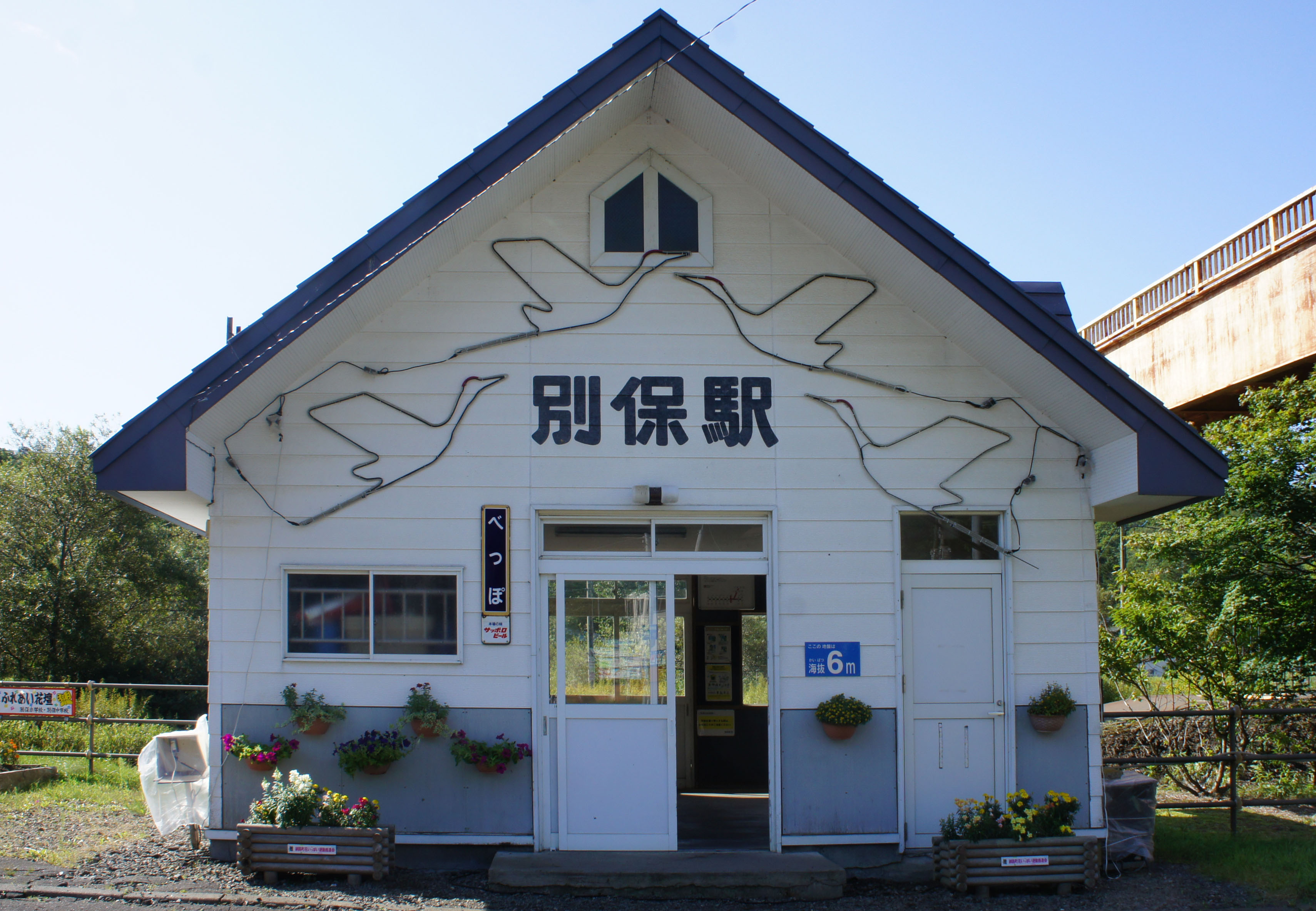
- The station in September 2018

General information
- Location: Beppo 4-chome, Kushiro, Kushiro District, Hokkaido 088-0604; Japan
- Coordinates: 42°59′39.81″N 144°28′10.6″E
- System: regional rail
- Operator: JR Hokkaido
- Line: Nemuro Main Line
- Distance: 180.7 km from Shintoku
- Platforms: 1 side platform
- Tracks: 1

Other information
- Status: Unattended
- Website: Official website

History
- Opened: 1 December 1917
- Former names: Kamibepppo (to 1952)

Passengers
- FY2022: 3 daily

Services
Preceding station	JR Hokkaido	Following station
Musa towards Takikawa	Nemuro Main Line Local	Kami-Oboro towards Nemuro
Location
- Location within Hokkaido Location within Japan

Beppo Station (別保駅, Beppo-eki) is a railway station located in the town of Kushiro, Hokkaidō, Japan. It is operated by JR Hokkaido.

== Lines ==
The station is served by the Hanasaku Line portion of the Nemuro Main Line, and lies 180.7 km from the starting point of the line at Shintoku .

== Layout ==
Beppo Station has a single side platform with a wooden station building. The station is unattended.

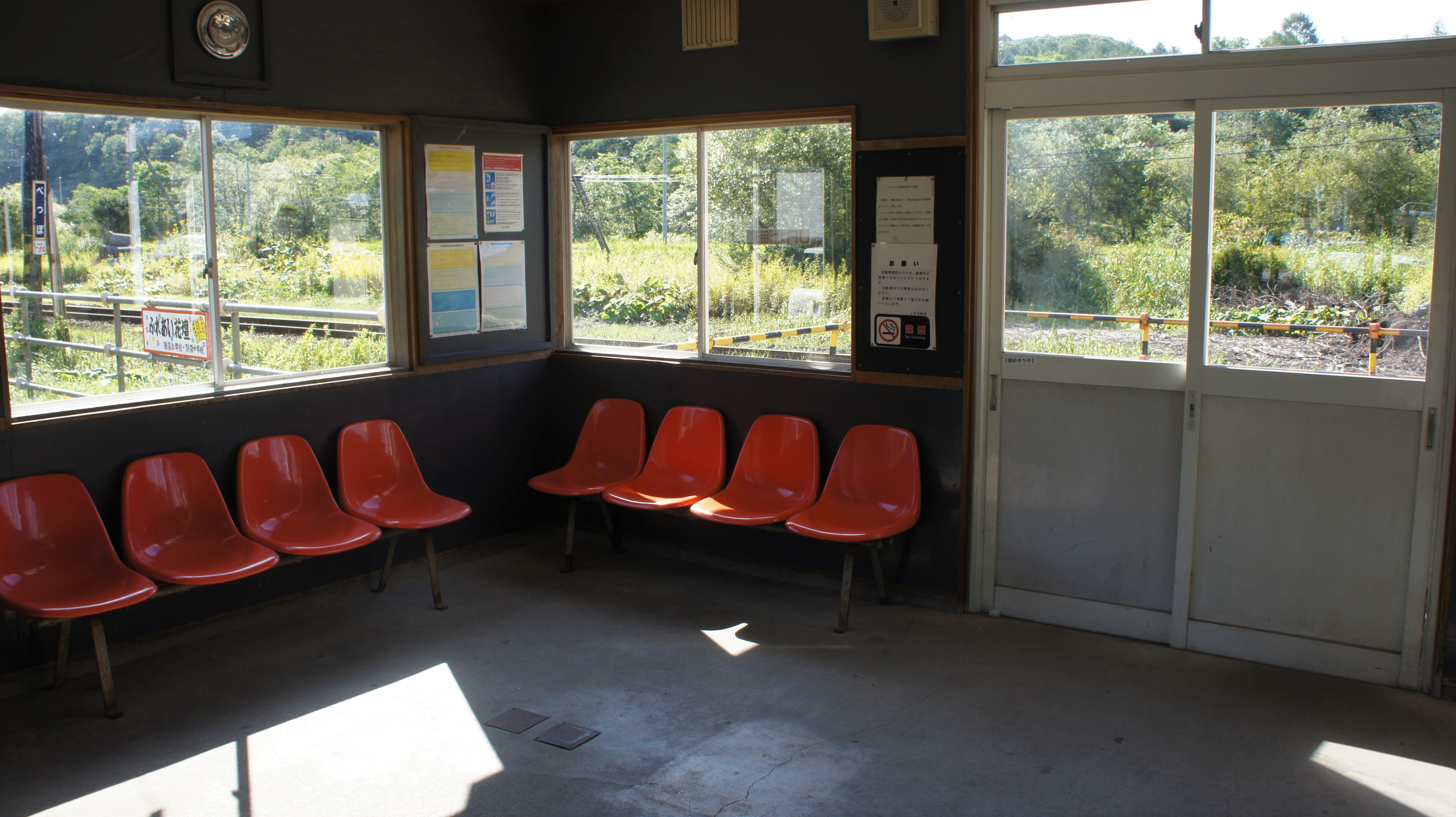
Waiting Room

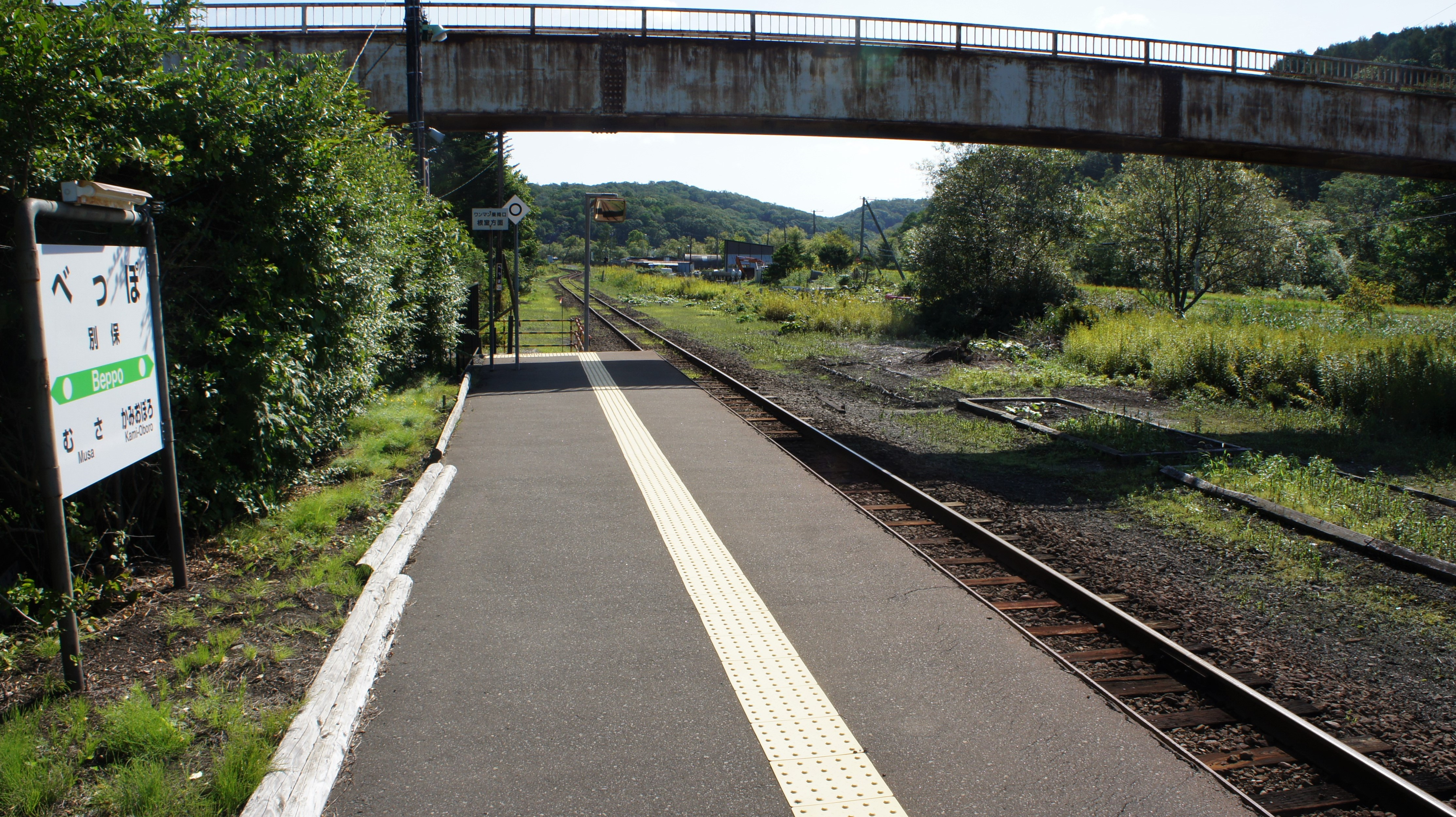
Platform

== History ==
The station opened on 1 December 1917 as Kamibeppo Station (上別保駅) with the extension of the Ministry of Railways Kushiro Main Line (now Nemuro Main Line) between Kushiro Station and Hama-Akkeshi Station. The current station building was completed in 1933. A 1.56 kilometer private freight spur line extended from this station to the Pacific Coal Beppo Coal Mine in November 1937. The station was renamed to its present name in 1952. Following the privatization of the Japanese National Railways on 1 April 1987, the station came under the control of JR Hokkaido.

== Passenger statistics ==
In fiscal 2022, the station was used by an average of 3.4 passengers daily.

== Surrounding area ==
Kushiro Town Hall is located near the station, across Japan National Route 44. The area in front of the station is relatively spacious, with ample parking space for multiple cars. There is also a park to the west of the station.

- Kushiro Police Station Beppo Substation
- Beppo Post Office
- Beppo Park

== See also ==
- List of railway stations in Japan
