= Oboro =

Oboro may refer to:

== Fiction ==
- Oboro, a character in the manga and anime series Gintama
- Oboro, a character in the novel The Kouga Ninja Scrolls
- Oboro (Utawarerumono), a character in the series Utawarerumono
- Oboro (Spriggan), a character in the manga series Spriggan
- Oboro, a character in the SNES role-playing game Live A Live
- Oboro clan, a clan in the video game series Shinobi
- Oboro Bishamon, a character from the Darkstalkers video game series
- Oboro Shintō, a character in the manga and anime series Yuuna and the Haunted Hot Springs

== Other uses ==
- Oboro (Nigeria), a clan in Abia State, Nigeria
- Oboro Station, a railway station in Akkeshi, Hokkaidō, Japan
- Japanese destroyer Oboro, two destroyers of the Imperial Japanese Navy
