= Musa Station =

Musa Station (武佐駅) is the name of multiple train stations in Japan:

- Musa Station (Hokkaido)
- Musa Station (Shiga)
