= Hamanaka Station =

Railway station in Hamanaka, Hokkaido, Japan

Hamanaka Station 浜中駅
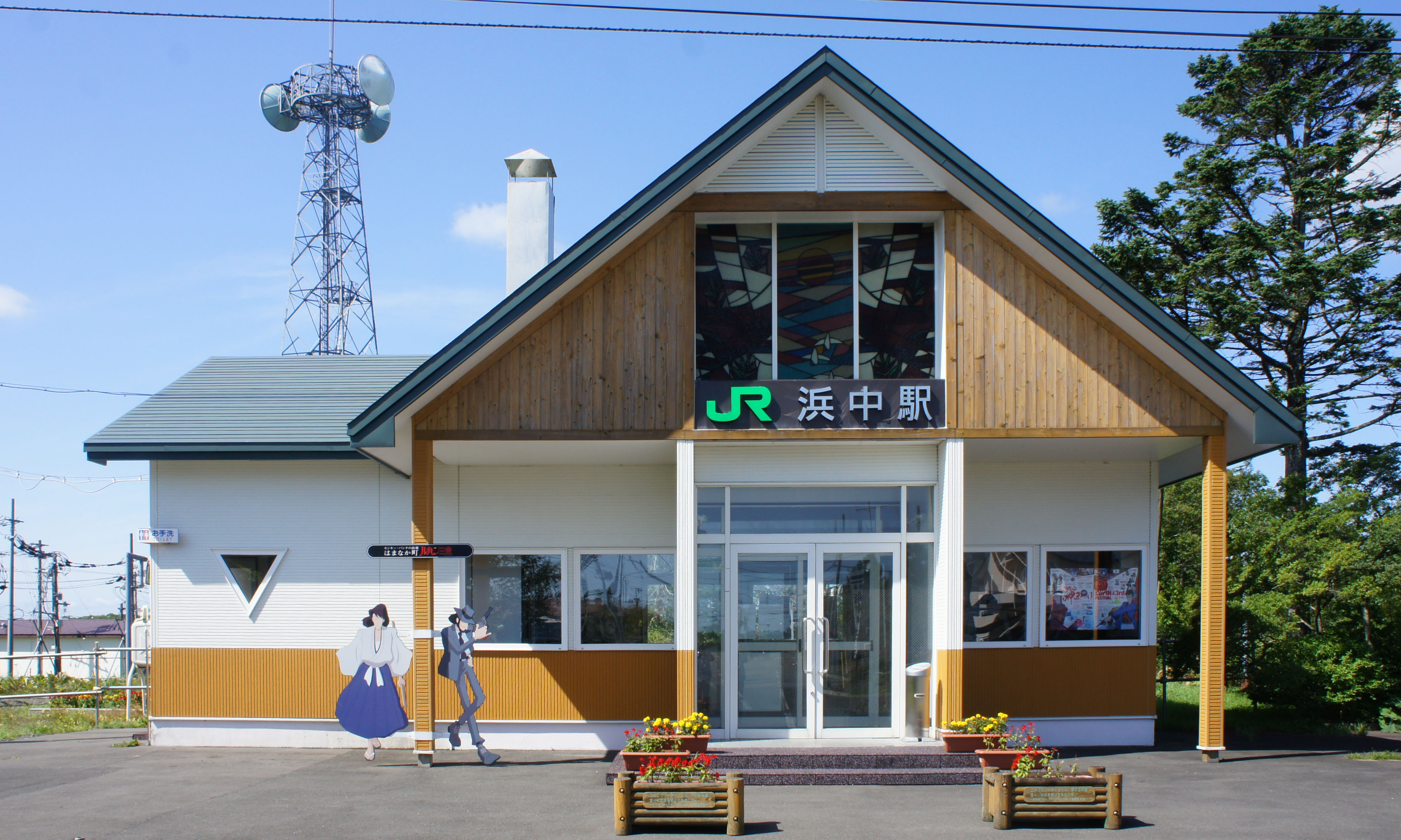
- The station building in September 2018

General information
- Location: 5 Hamanaka Sakurakita, Hamanaka-cho, Akkeshi-gun, Hokkaido; Japan
- Coordinates: 43°9′27.14″N 145°5′58.77″E
- System: regional rail
- Operator: JR Hokkaido
- Line: Nemuro Main Line
- Distance: 245.9 km from Shintoku
- Platforms: 1 side platform
- Tracks: 2

Other information
- Status: Unattended
- Website: Official website

History
- Opened: 25 November 1919

Passengers
- FY2022: 5 daily

Services
Preceding station	JR Hokkaido	Following station
Chanai towards Takikawa	Nemuro Main Line Local	Anebetsu towards Nemuro
Location
- Location within Hokkaido Location within Japan

Hamanaka Station (浜中駅, Hamanaka-eki) is a railway station located in the town of Hamanaka, Hokkaidō, Japan. It is operated by JR Hokkaido.

== Lines ==
The station is served by the Hanasaku Line portion of the Nemuro Main Line, and lies 245.9 km from the starting point of the line at Shintoku .

== Layout ==
Hamanaka Station has one side platform, and a "Scandinavian cottage style" station building.

Hamanaka Town, where the station is located, is the hometown of Monkey Punch, known for the manga "Lupin the Third," and life-size panels of Lupin and other characters are installed at the station.

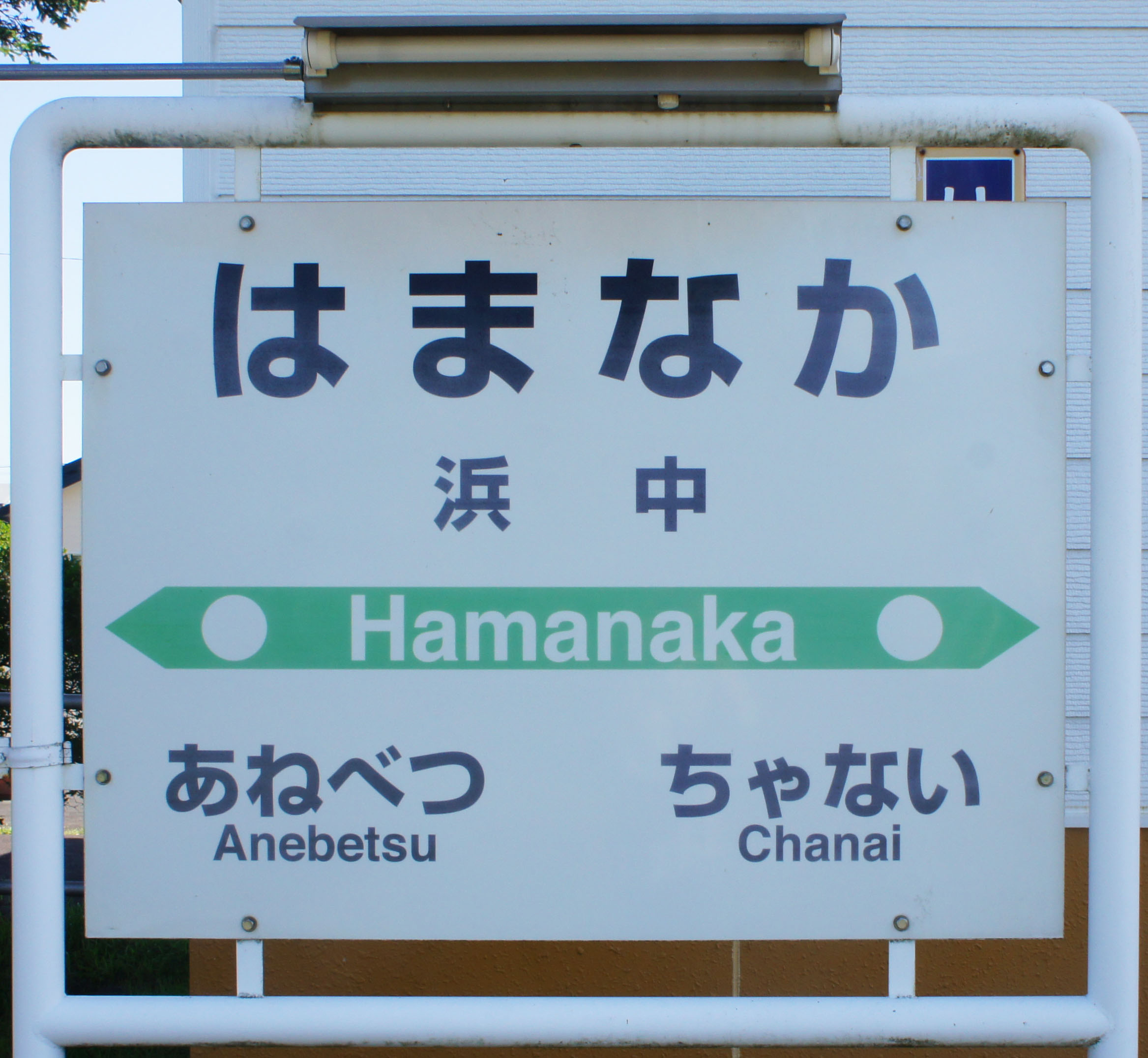
Signboard

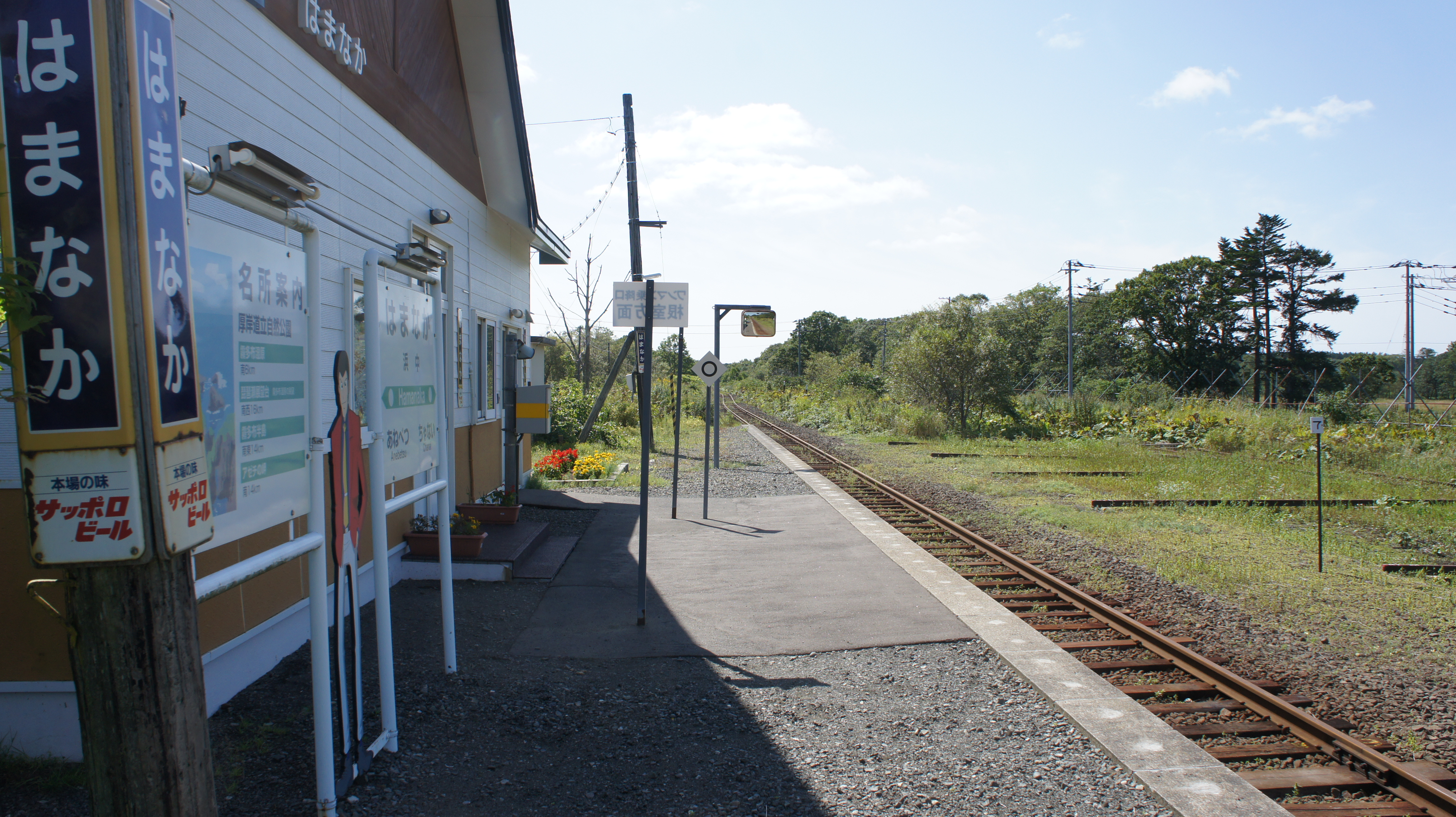
Platform

== History ==
The station opened on 25 November 1919 with the extension of the Railway Bureau Kushiro Main Line (later Nemuro Main Line) between Kushiro Station and Hama-Akkeshi Station. Following the privatization of the Japanese National Railways on 1 April 1987, the station came under the control of JR Hokkaido. A new side platform was added on 22 March 1989. }. The current station building was opened on 27 December 1989 and inlcludes a tourist information center and a local product exhibition room.

== Passenger statistics ==
In fiscal 2022, the station was used by an average of 5 passengers daily.

== Surrounding area ==
- Hokkaido Highway 449
- Hokkaido Highway 123
- Japan National Route 44
- Hamanaka Town Hall Hamanaka Branch

== See also ==
- List of railway stations in Japan
