= Oboro Station =

Railway station in Akkeshi, Hokkaido, Japan

Oboro Station 尾幌駅
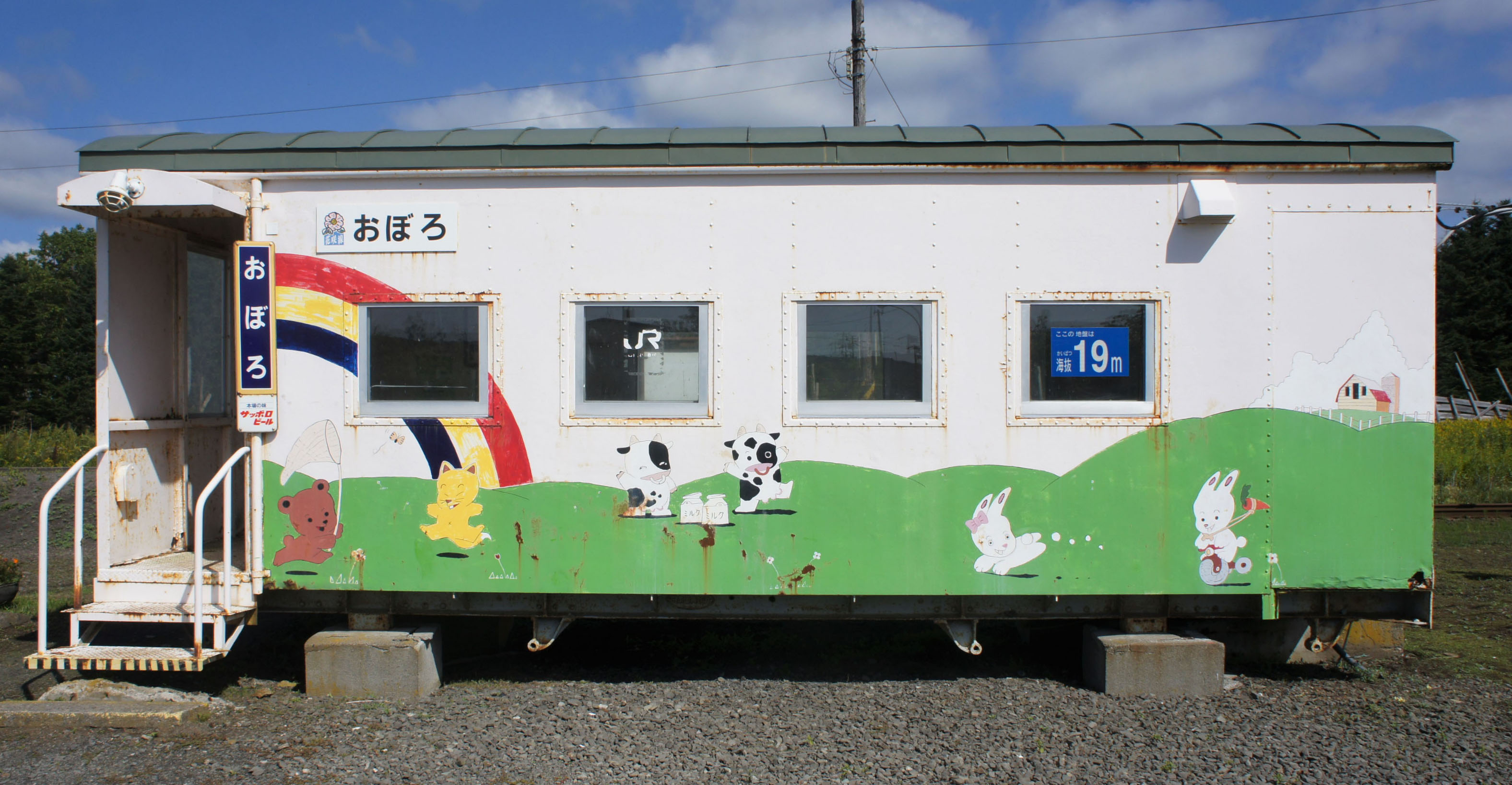
- The station building in September 2018

General information
- Location: Oboro, Akkeshi-cho, Akkeshi-gun, Hokkaido 088-0871; Japan
- Coordinates: 43°1′6.5″N 144°42′13.91″E
- System: regional rail
- Operator: JR Hokkaido
- Line: Nemuro Main Line
- Distance: 204.6 km from Shintoku
- Platforms: 1 side platform
- Tracks: 1

Other information
- Status: Unattended
- Website: Official website

History
- Opened: 1 December 1917

Passengers
- FY2022: 3 daily

Services
Preceding station	JR Hokkaido	Following station
Kami-Oboro towards Takikawa	Nemuro Main Line Local	Monshizu towards Nemuro
Location
- Location within Hokkaido Location within Japan

Oboro Station (尾幌駅, Oboro-eki) is a railway station located in the town of Akkeshi, Hokkaidō, Japan.

== Lines ==
The station is served by the Hanasaku Line segment of the Nemuro Main Line, and lies 204.6 km from the starting point of the line at Shintoku .

== Layout ==
Oboro Station has one side platform. The station building is a converted caboose. The station is unattended.

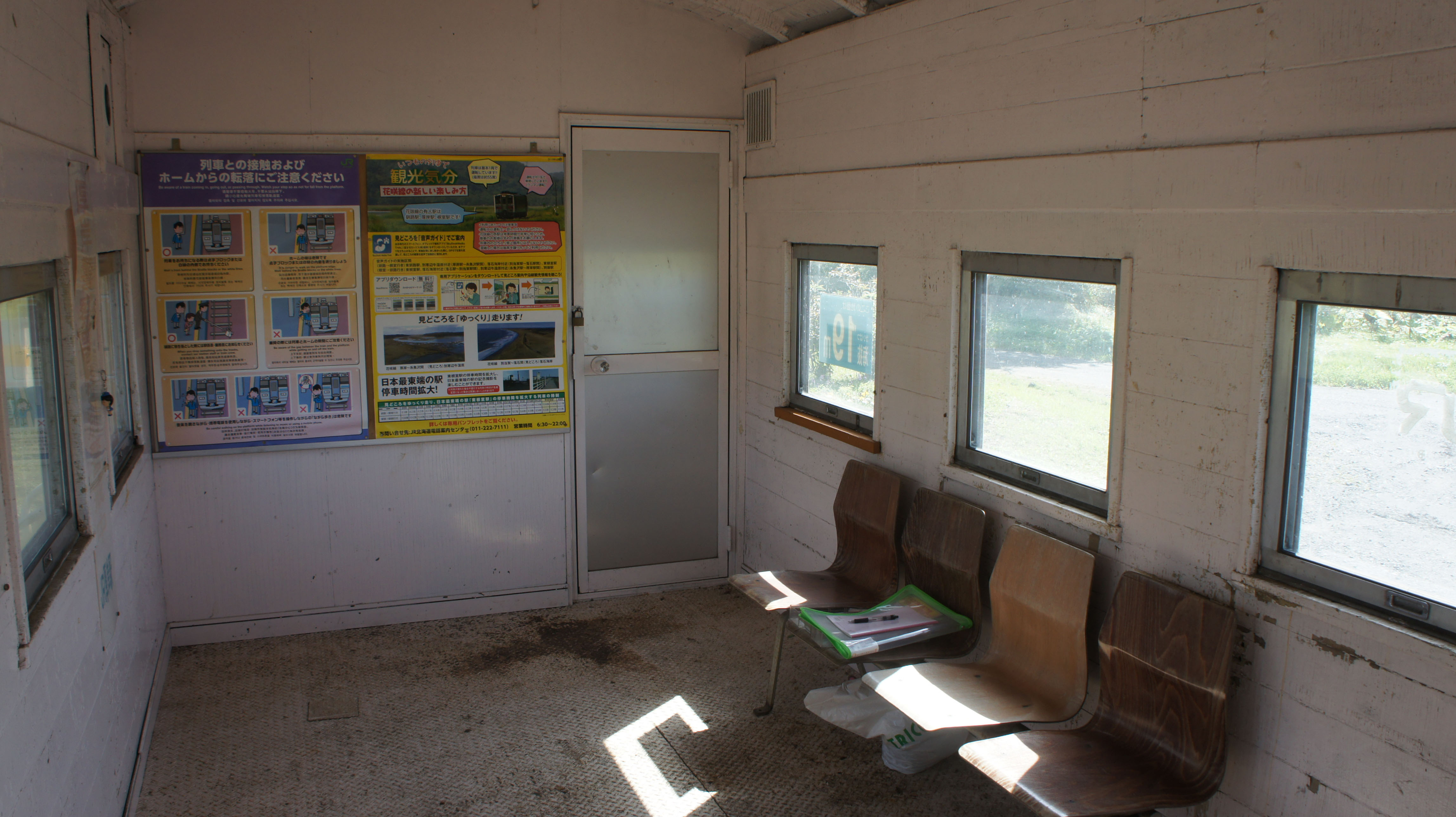
Waiting Room

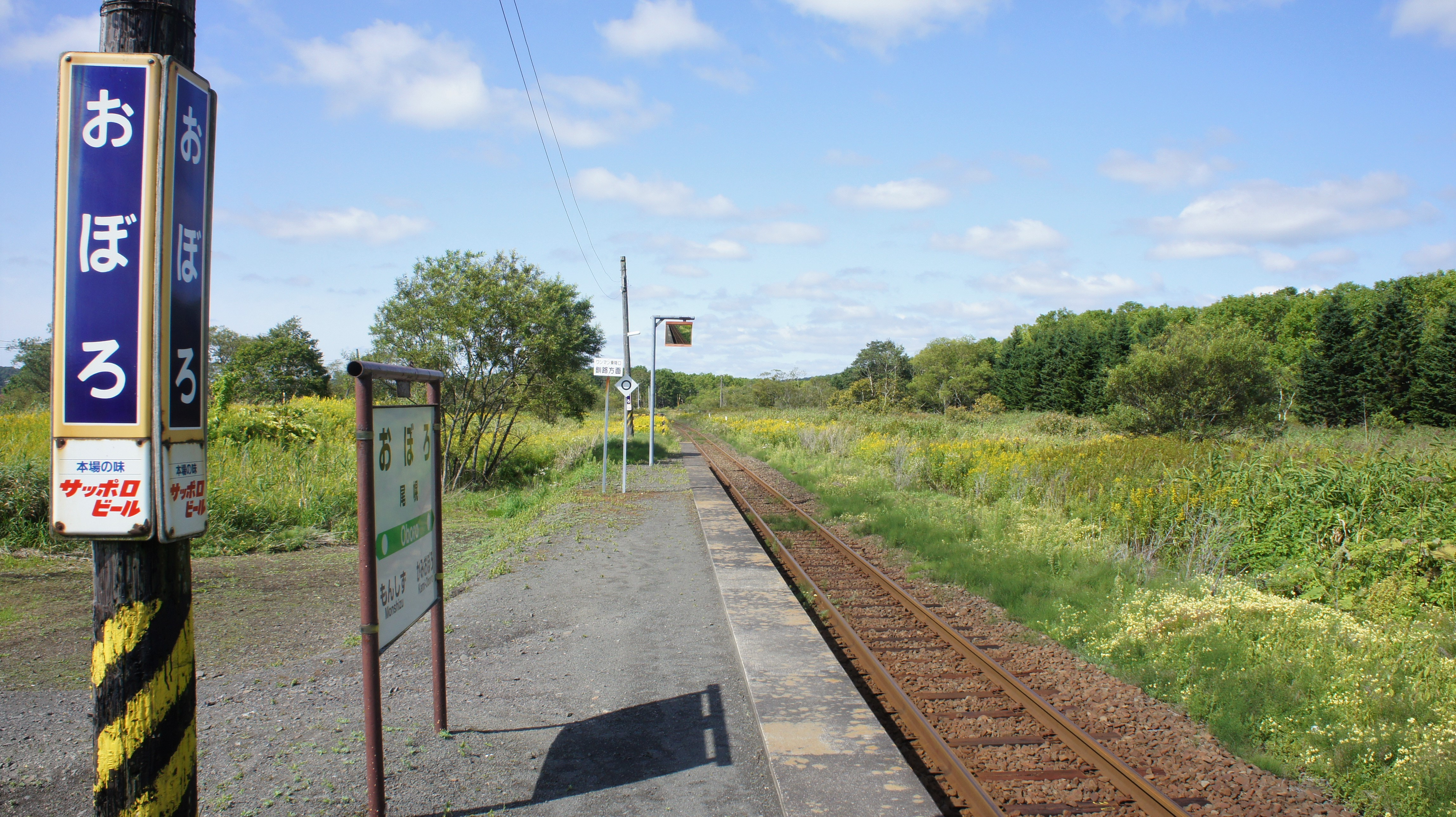
Platform

== History ==
The station opened on 1 December 1917 with the extension of the Ministry of Railways Kushiro Main Line (later Nemuro Main Line) between Kushiro Station and Hama-Akkeshi Station. Following the privatization of the Japanese National Railways on 1 April 1987, the station came under the control of JR Hokkaido. A new side platform was added on 22 March 1989.

In June 2023, this station was selected to be among 42 stations on the JR Hokkaido network to be slated for abolition owing to low ridership.

== Passenger statistics ==
In fiscal 2022, the station was used by an average of 3 passengers daily.

== Surrounding area ==
- Japan National Route 44

== See also ==
- List of railway stations in Japan
