= Japanese destroyer Oboro =

Two Japanese destroyers have been named Oboro (朧, ”gloom”):

- Japanese destroyer Oboro (1899), an Ikazuchi-class destroyer of the Imperial Japanese Navy during the Russo-Japanese War
- Japanese destroyer Oboro (1930), a Fubuki-class destroyer of the Imperial Japanese Navy during World War II

== See also ==
- Oboro
