= Musa Station (Hokkaido) =

Railway station in Kushiro, Hokkaido, Japan

Musa Station 武佐駅
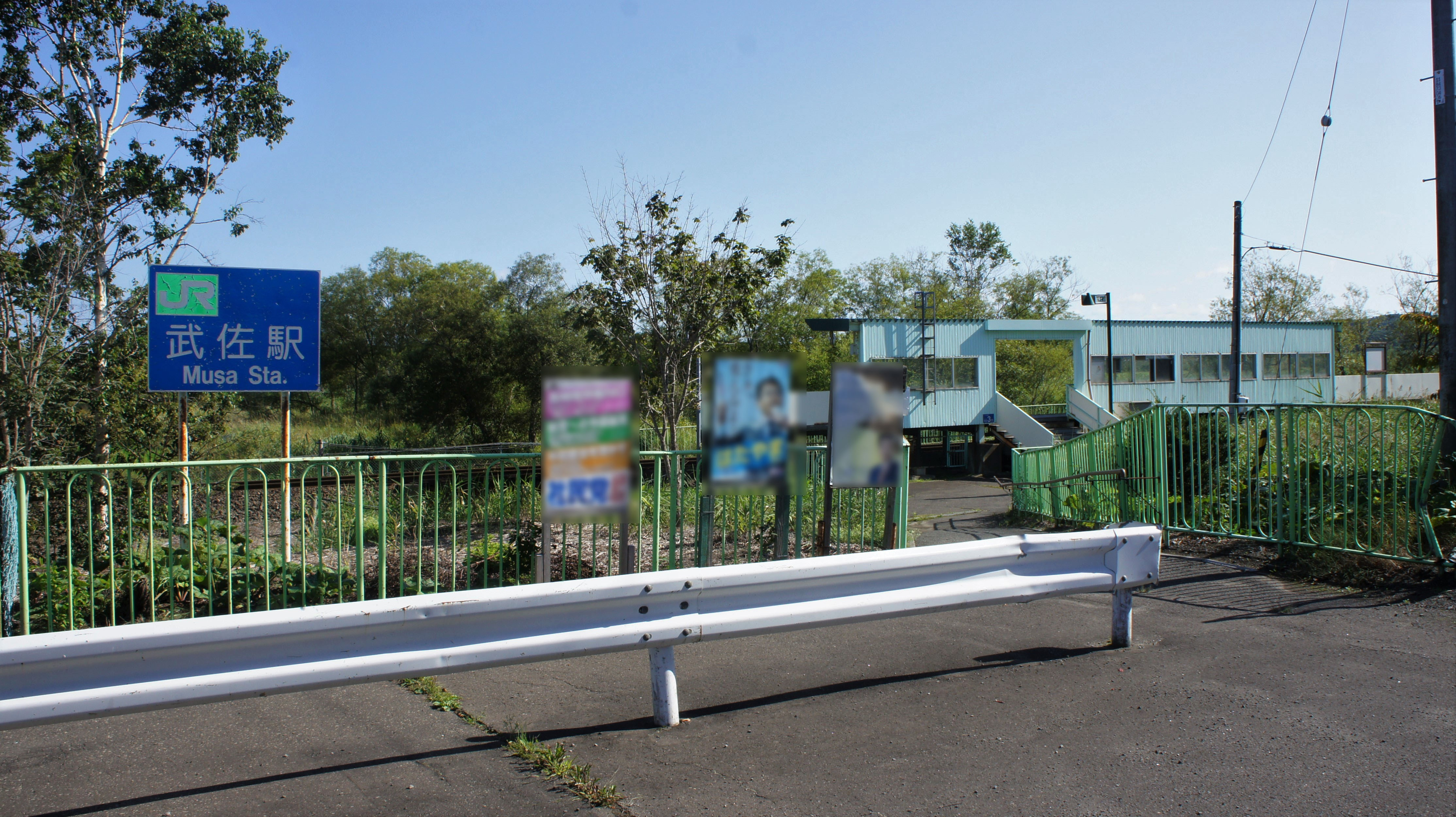
- The station in September 2018

General information
- Location: Musa 4-chome, Kushiro-shi, Hokkaido 085-0806; Japan
- Coordinates: 42°59′30.34″N 144°25′32.43″E
- System: regional rail
- Operator: JR Hokkaido
- Line: Nemuro Main Line
- Distance: 176.2 km from Shintoku
- Platforms: 1 side platform
- Tracks: 1

Other information
- Status: Unattended
- Website: Official website

History
- Opened: 13 March 1988

Passengers
- FY2022: 3 daily

Services
Preceding station	JR Hokkaido	Following station
Higashi-Kushiro towards Takikawa	Nemuro Main Line Local	Beppo towards Nemuro
Location
- Location within Hokkaido Location within Japan

Musa Station (武佐駅, Musa-eki) is a railway station located in the city of Kushiro, Hokkaidō, Japan. It is operated by JR Hokkaido.

== Lines ==
The station is served by the Hanasaku Line segment of the Nemuro Main Line, and lies 176.2 km from the starting point of the line at Shintoku .

== Layout ==
Musa Station has a single side platform with a lean-to shelter on the platform, but no station building.

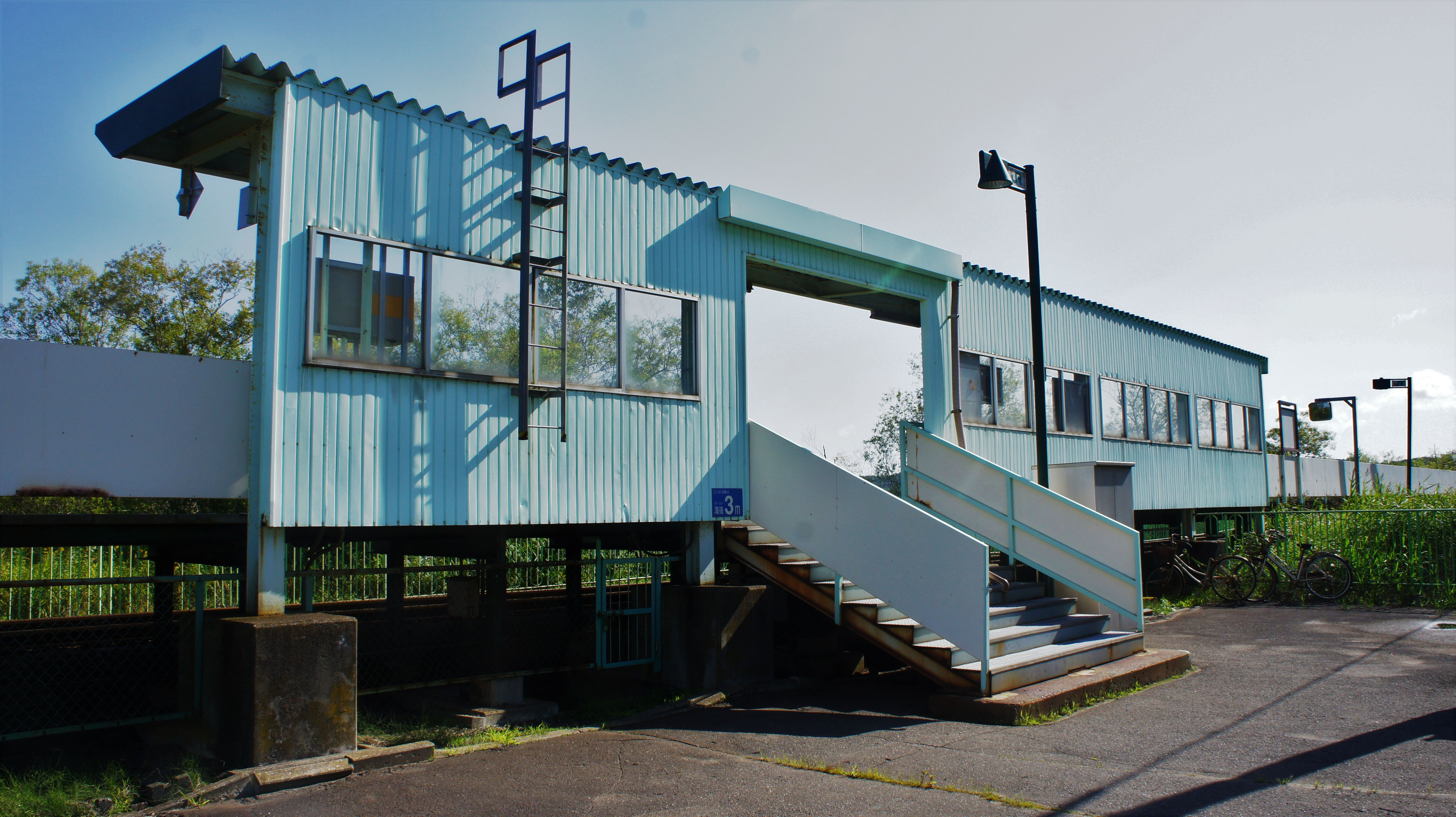
Musa Station

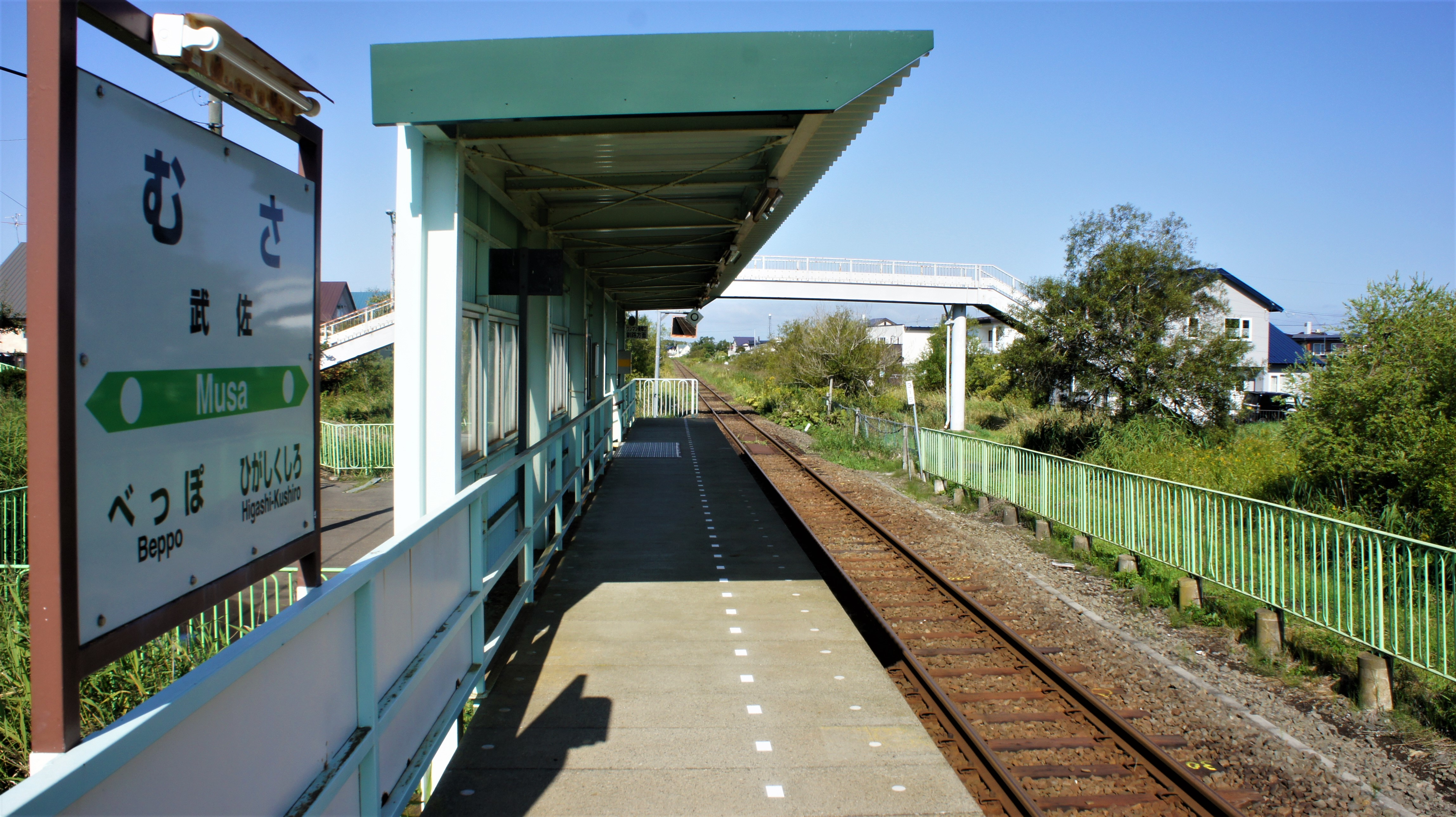
Platform

== History ==
The station opened on 13 March 1988 as new station to serve the newly developed residential area in the eastern part of Kushiro City.

== Passenger statistics ==
In fiscal 2022, the station was used by an average of 4 passengers daily.

== Surrounding area ==
North of the station is a wilderness area, while south is a newly developed residential area. Musa no Mori, a public park, serves as a popular recreational spot for local residents. It was the closest station to Hokkaido Kushiro Seien High School, but the school closed in March 2009.

- Kushiro Wakakusa Post Office
- Kushiro Municipal Musa Elementary School
- Musa River

== See also ==
- List of railway stations in Japan
