= Attoko Station =

Railway station in Nemuro, Hokkaido, Japan

Coordinates: 43°13′42″N 145°15′09″E

Attoko Station 厚床駅
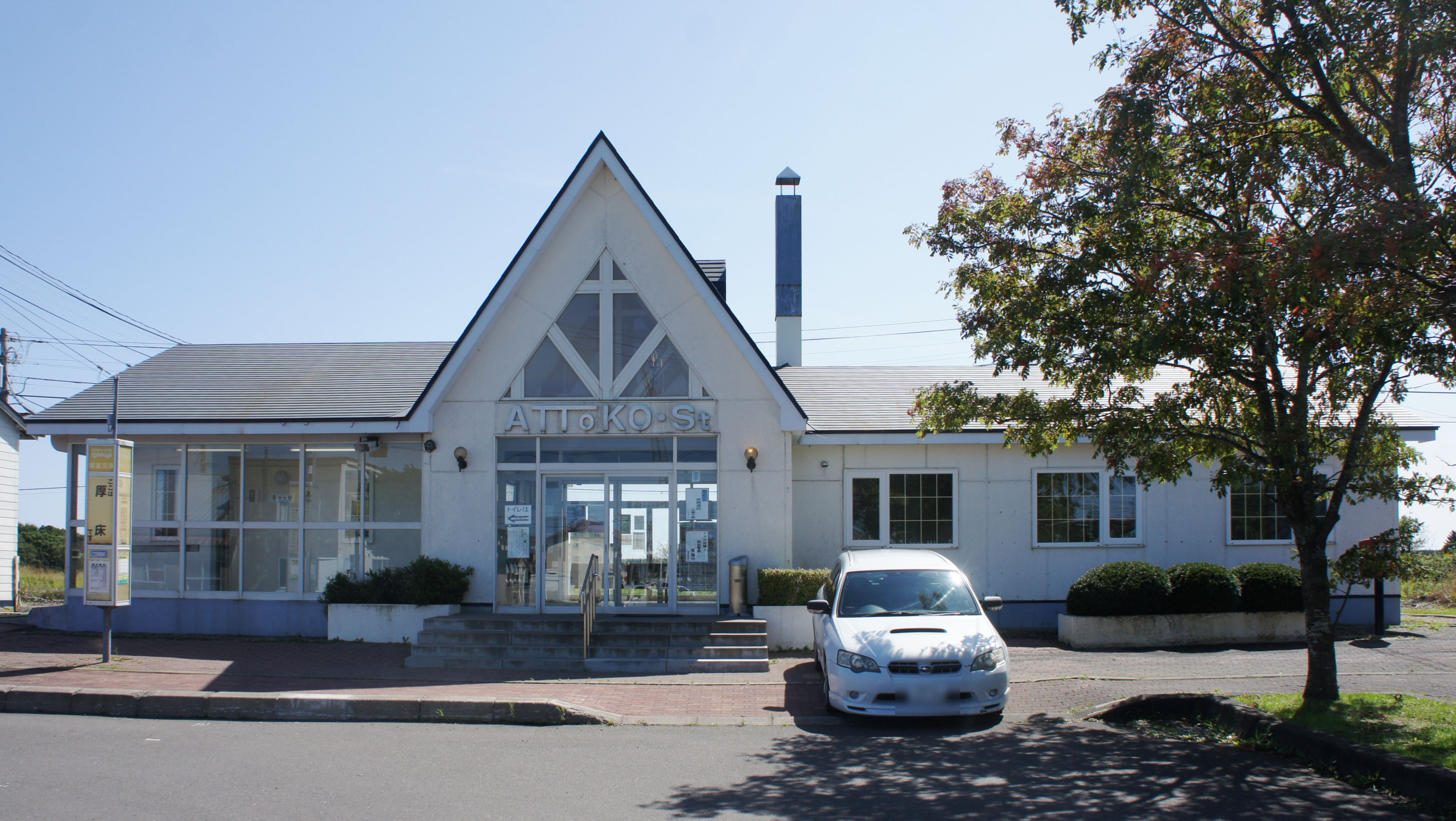
- Attoko Station (September 2018)

General information
- Location: Nemuro, Hokkaido; Japan
- Operator: Hokkaido Railway Company
- Line: ■ Nemuro Main Line
- Platforms: 1 Side platform
- Tracks: 1

Construction
- Structure type: At-grade
- Accessible: No

History
- Opened: 25 November 1919
Location
- Location within Japan

Attoko Station (厚床駅, Attoko-eki) is a railway station on the Nemuro Main Line of JR Hokkaido located in Nemuro, Hokkaidō, Japan. The station opened on November 25, 1919. It used to be a branch station of the Shibetsu Line (Attoko Branch Line).

== History ==
The station was opened on November 25, 1919 by the Ministry of Railways upon the extension of the current Nemuro Main Line from Akkeshi Station to this station.
