= Akkeshi Station =

Railway station in Akkeshi, Hokkaido, Japan

Akkeshi Station 厚岸駅
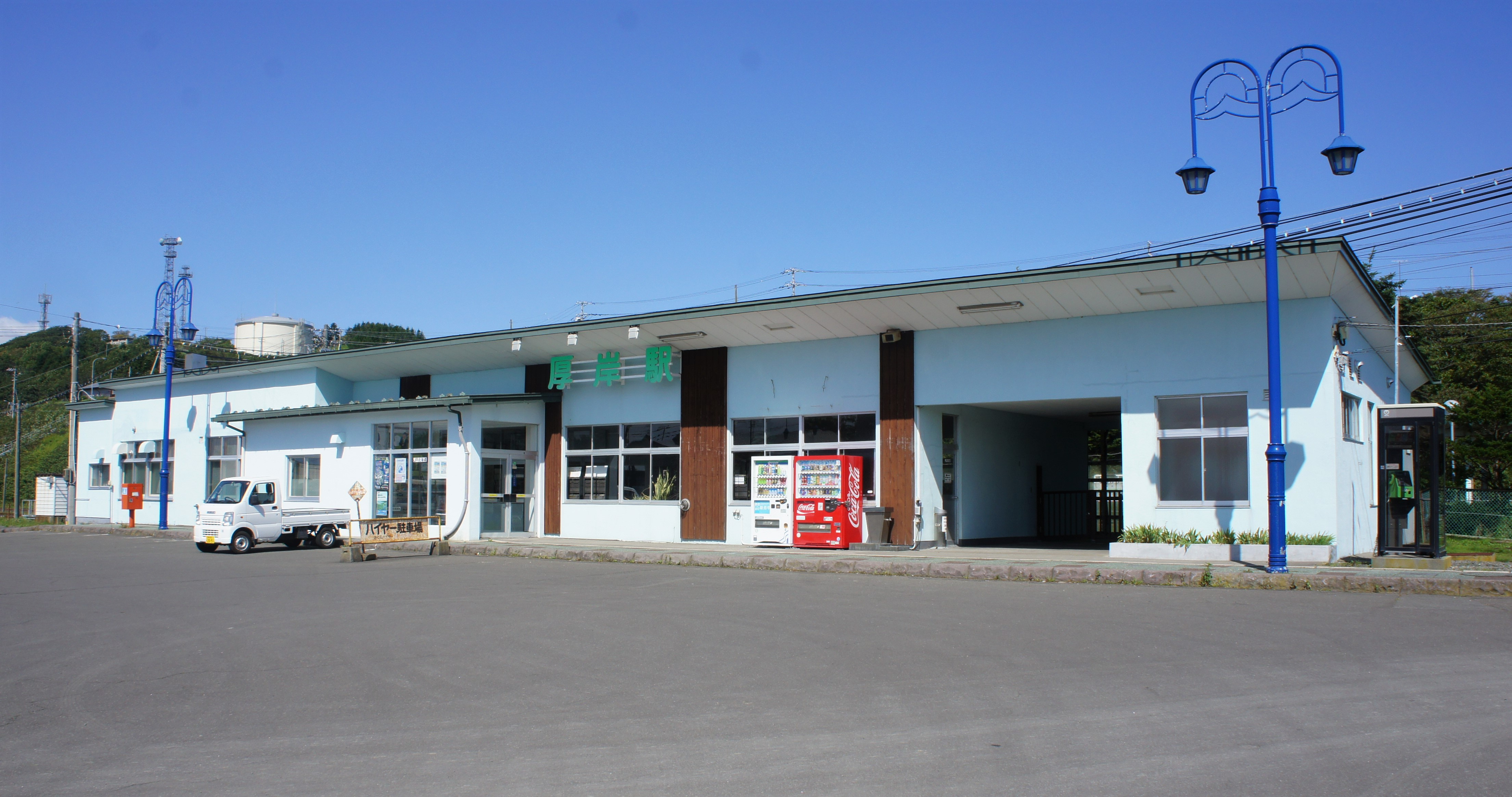
- The station building in September 2018

General information
- Location: Miyazono 1-chome, Akkeshi-cho, Akkeshi-gun, Hokkaido 088-1124; Japan
- Coordinates: 43°3′22.49″N 144°50′28.38″E
- System: regional rail
- Operator: JR Hokkaido
- Line: Nemuro Main Line
- Distance: 218.7 km from Shintoku
- Platforms: 2 side platforms
- Tracks: 2

Other information
- Status: Staffed (Midori no Madoguchi)
- Website: Official website

History
- Opened: 1 December 1917

Passengers
- FY2022: 115 daily

Services
Preceding station	JR Hokkaido	Following station
Monshizu towards Takikawa	Nemuro Main Line Local	Chanai towards Nemuro
Location
- Location within Hokkaido Location within Japan

Akkeshi Station (厚岸駅, Akkeshi-eki) is a railway station located in the town of Akkeshi, Hokkaidō, Japan. It is operated by JR Hokkaido.

== Lines ==
The station is served by the Hanasaku Line segment of the Nemuro Main Line, and lies 218.7 km from the starting point of the line at Shintoku .

== Layout ==
Akkashi Station has two single-track platforms. The platforms are connected by a footbridge. Previously, both sides of a single island platform were used. However, following the removal of a freight spur to Hama-Akkeshi Station, which ran in front of the station, an additional side platform was added directly to the station's ticket gates to eliminate the need for the footbridge. Platform 1 now has platforms on both sides of the tracks, but a fence has been installed on the former island platform, preventing passengers from boarding or alighting. Currently, both inbound and outbound trains primarily depart and arrive on the newly added platform. It is the easternmost station in Japan with a footbridge.

The station building is a single-story, reinforced concrete structure, with its exterior repainted light blue in 2005. It is the only staffed station on the Hanasaki Line, and has a Midori no Madoguchi ticket office.

=== Platforms ===
1	■ Nemuro Main Line	for Nemuro for Asahikawa
2	■ Nemuro Main Line	for Nemuro (used only when there are passing trains)

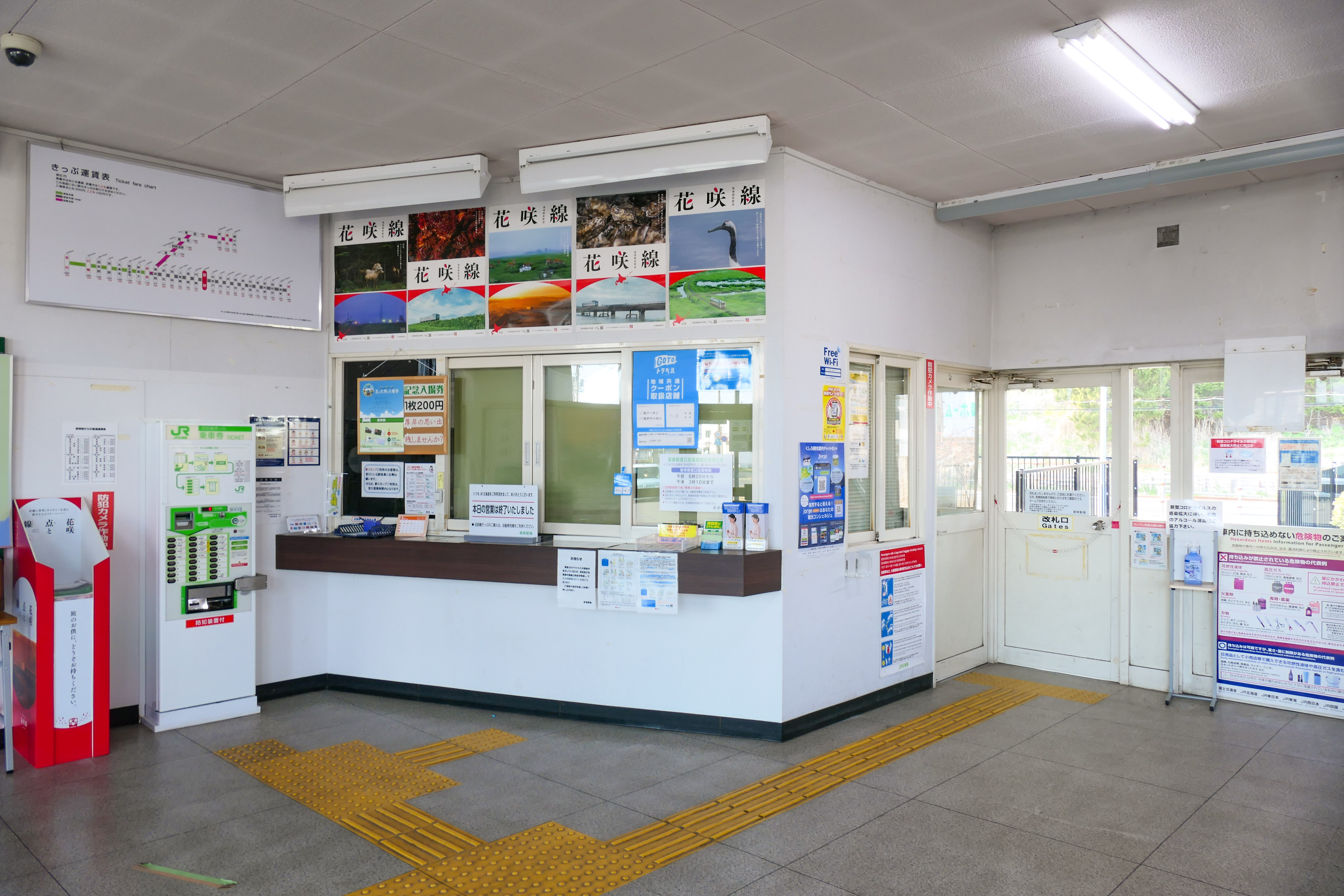
Ticket Gate

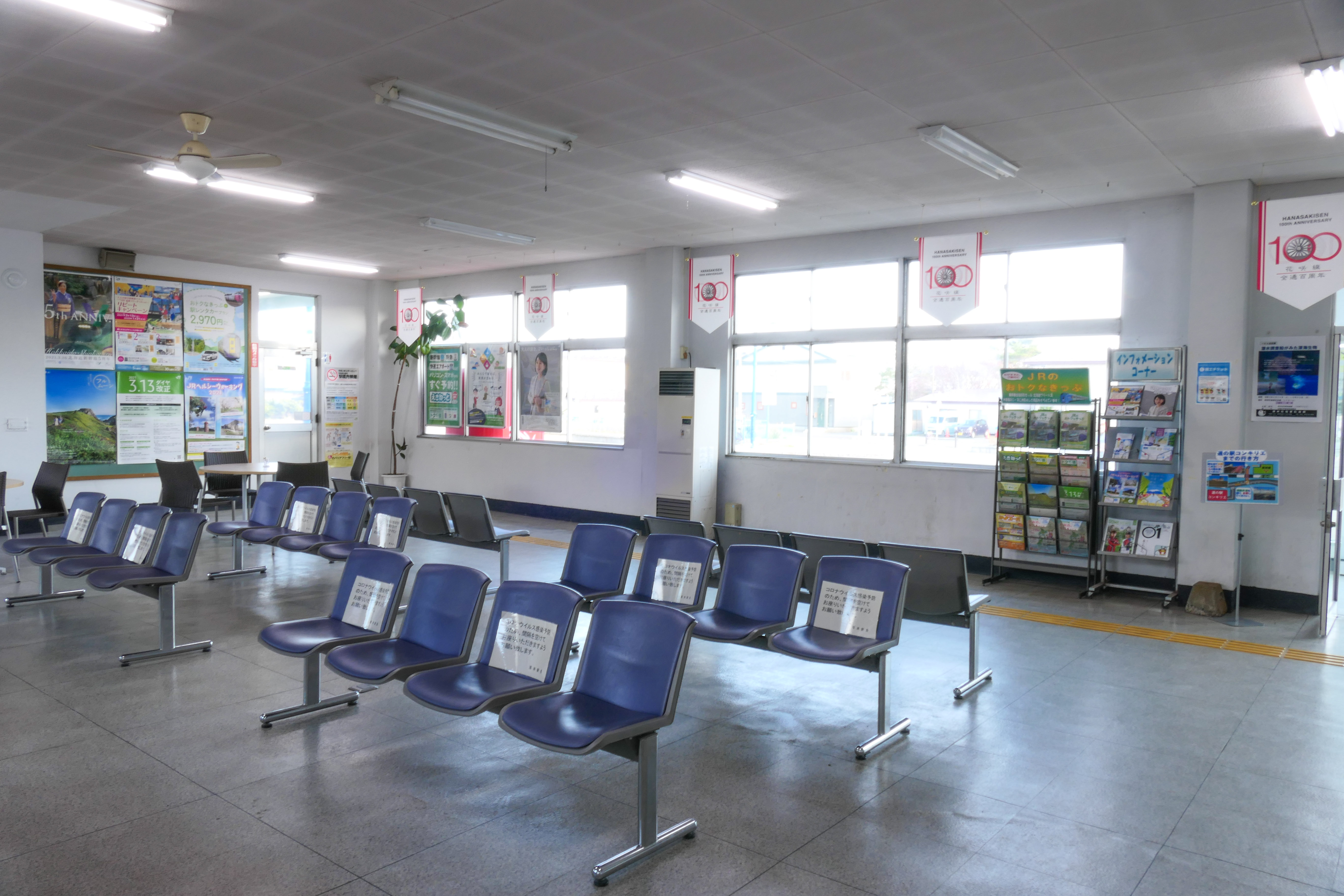
Waiting Room

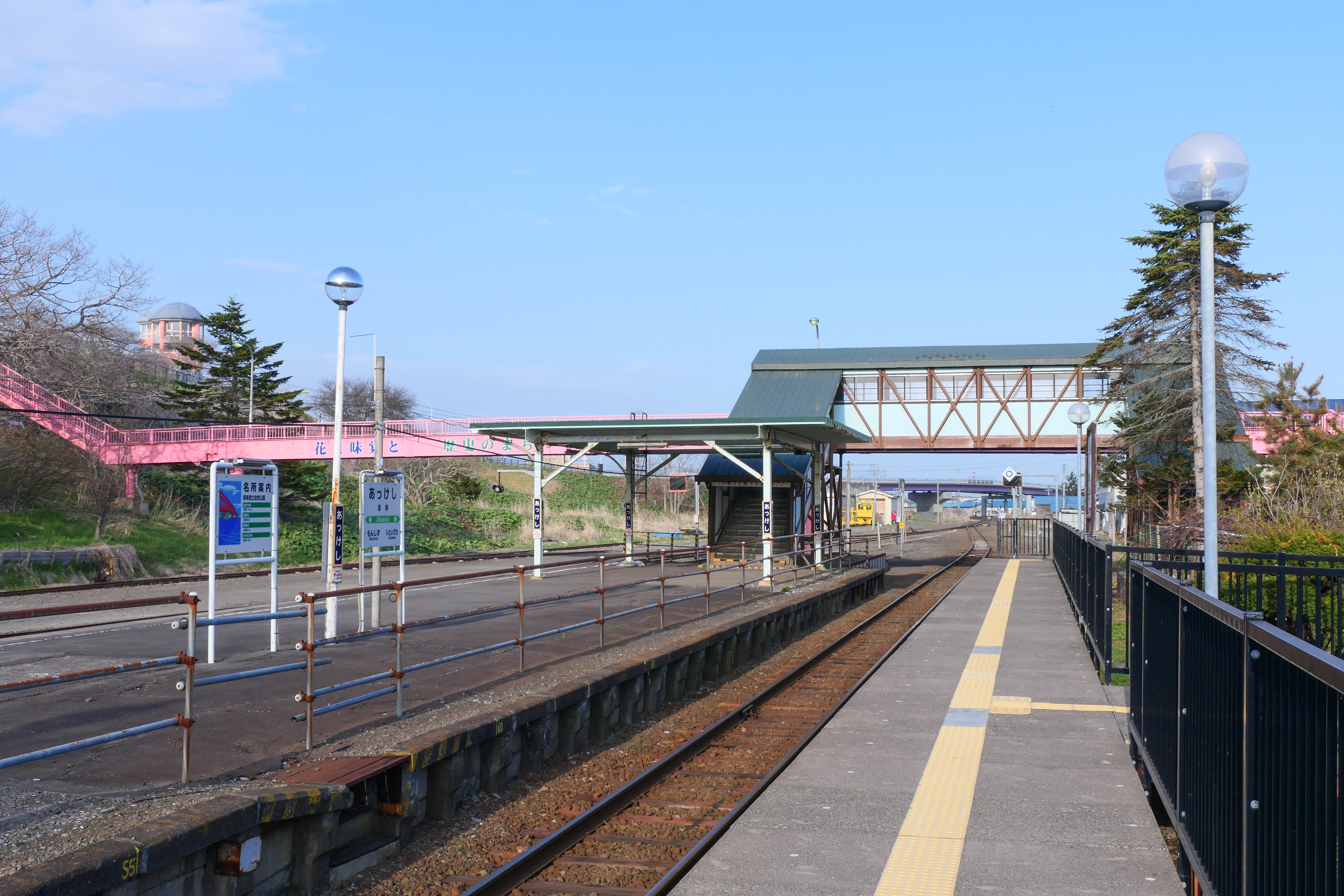
Platform

== History ==
The station opened on 1 December 1917 with the extension of the Ministry of Railways Kushiro Main Line (later Nemuro Main Line) between Kushiro Station and Hama-Akkeshi Station. The station building was rebuilt in 1965.The Kushiro Locomotive Depot Akkeshi Station was abolished on 30 March 1966 and the freight spur line to Hama-Akkeshi was abolished on 15 November 1982. Following the privatization of the Japanese National Railways on 1 April 1987, the station came under the control of JR Hokkaido. A new side platform was added on 22 March 1989.

== Passenger statistics ==
In fiscal 2022, the station was used by an average of 115 passengers daily.

== Surrounding area ==
- Roadside Station Akkeshi Gourmet Park
- Akkeshi Town Hall
- Akkeshi Municipal Hospital

== See also ==
- List of railway stations in Japan
