= Shintoku Station =

Railway station in Shintoku, Hokkaido, Japan

Coordinates: 43.0824°N 142.8325°E

Shintoku Station 新得駅
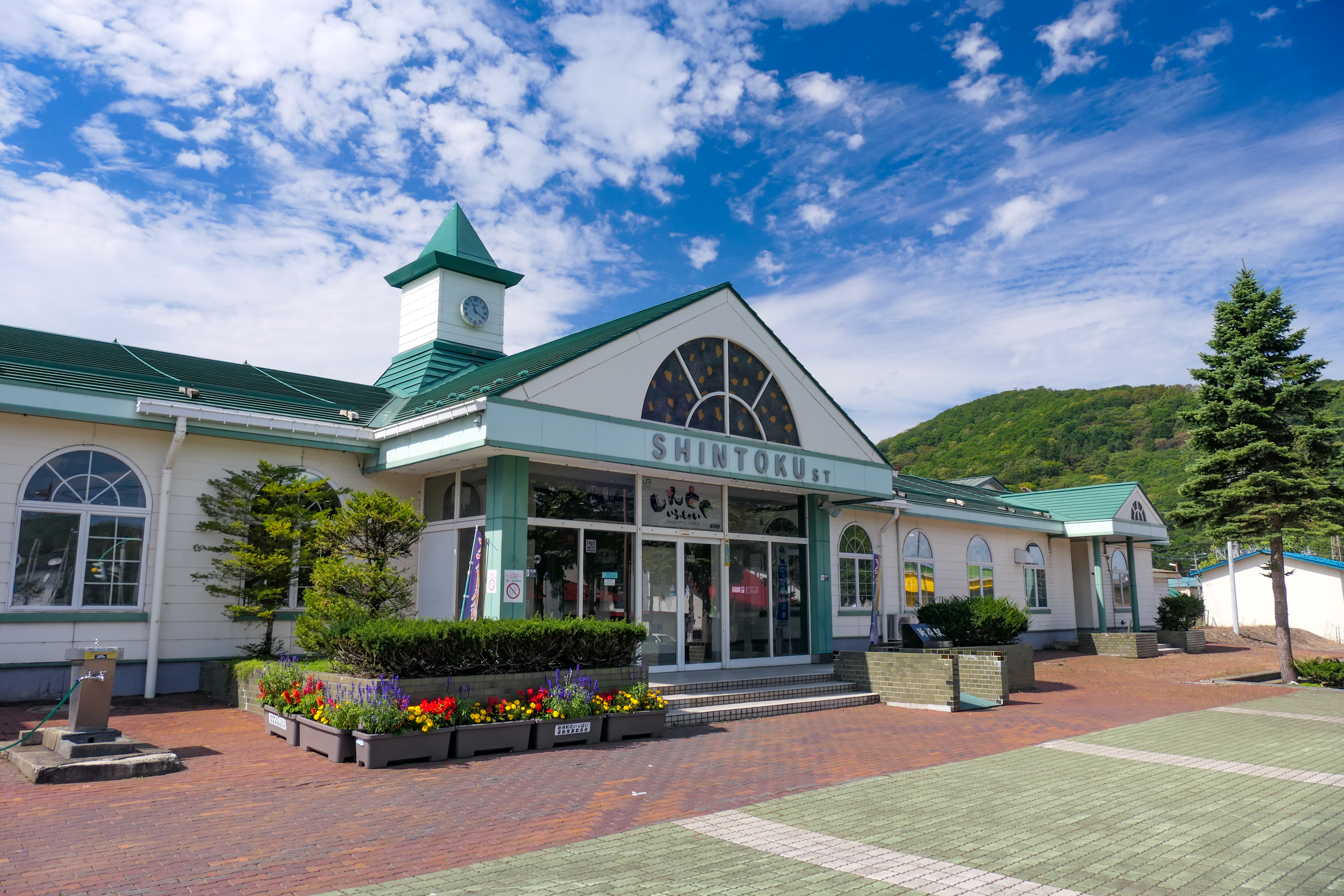
- Station building, 2021

General information
- Operator: JR Hokkaido
- Platforms: 1 island platform and 1 side platform
- Tracks: 3

Construction
- Structure type: At grade

Other information
- Station code: K23

History
- Opened: 8 September 1907; 119 years ago

Services
Preceding station	JR Hokkaido	Following station
Heavy Rail
Tomamu towards Minami-Chitose	Sekishō Line Local	Terminus
Regional Rail
Terminus	Nemuro Main Line Local	Tokachi-Shimizu towards Nemuro
Limited Express
Tomamu towards Sapporo	Ōzora	Tokachi-Shimizu towards Kushiro
Tomamu towards Sapporo	Tokachi	Tokachi-Shimizu towards Obihiro
Location
- Location within Hokkaido Location within Japan

Shintoku Station (新得駅, Shintoku-eki) is a railway station in Shintoku, Kamikawa District, Hokkaidō, Japan. Its station number is K23.

== Lines ==
- Hokkaido Railway Company
  - Nemuro Main Line
  - Sekishō Line

== History ==
The station opened on 8 September 1907.

=== Future plans ===
In 2016, the section of the Nemuro Main Line between Shintoku and Higashi-Shikagoe suffered extensive damage due to heavy rainfall. Since then, a substitute bus service has been in place to serve this section of the Nemuro Main Line. However, in 2024 it was decided that the Nemuro Main Line between Furano and Shintoku would be closed permanently effective 1 April of that year, making Shintoku the western terminus of the eastern section of the Nemuro Main Line.
