= K48 =

K48 may refer to:

- BMW K 1600 GT (K48) Touringbike from BMW Motorrad
- K-48 (Kansas highway)
- INS Vidyut (K48), a Veer-class corvette of the Indian Navy
- Nishi-Shoro Station, in Hokkaido, Japan
- Potassium-48, an isotope of potassium
- Symphony No. 8 (Mozart), by Wolfgang Amadeus Mozart
