= Shiranuka Line =

Defunct railway line in Hokkaido

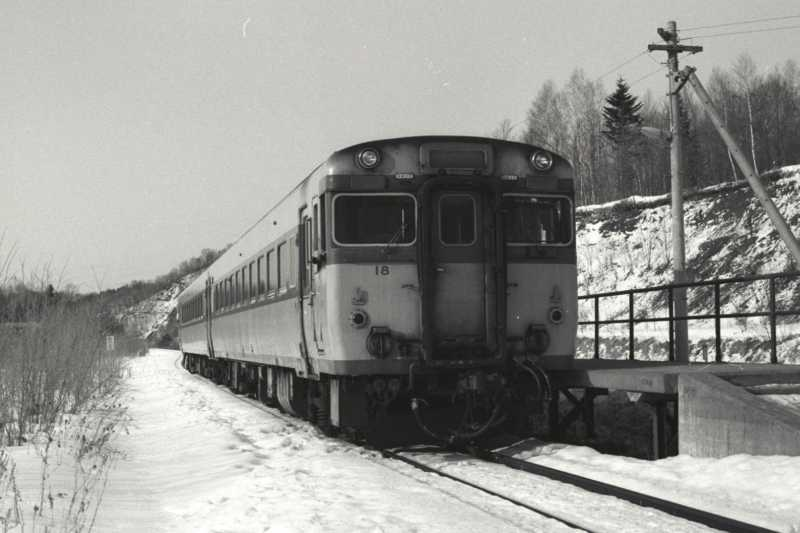
- KiHa 56 diesel railcar on Hokushin station (1983)

Overview
- Status: Defunct
- Termini: Shiranuka; Hokushin
- Stations: 7

History
- Opened: October 7, 1964
- Last extension: September 8, 1972
- Closed: October 23, 1983

Technical
- Line length: 138.1 km (85.8 mi)
- Num of tracks: Entire line single tracked
- Track gauge: 1,067 mm (3 ft 6 in)
- Minimum radius: 300 m (980 ft)
- Electrification: None
- Maximum incline: 16‰

Shiranuka Line (白糠線) was a rail line which was operated by Japanese National Railways in Hokkaidō from 1964 to 1983.

The line was planned to branch off from Shiranuka Station on the Nemuro Main Line in Shiranuka, Shiranuka district, Hokkaidō, and connect to Ashoro Station on the Chihoku Line in Ashoro, Ashoro district, but actually opened only from Shiranuka Station to Hokushin Station in the Futomata district of the same town. The entire line was closed on October 23, 1983, as the first of the specified local lines to be closed.

== History ==
Before the Pacific War, there were plans to develop the northern part of Shiranuka with an east-west line that would have connected Mashū on the Senmō Main Line with Ashoro on the Chihoku Line. In 1952, planning began instead for a line running from south to north in the Charo Valley, which was also listed in the appendix of the revised Railway Construction Law the following year. Along the planned route, there were 64,000 hectares of forest resources and deposits of around 320 million tons of high-quality hard coal. Several mining companies opened mines, but the mined coal had to be transported away by truck, which caused higher costs and made it difficult to increase production.

Construction work on the railroad line began in June 1958, but progress was rather slow. On October 7, 1964, the Japan National Railway opened the 25.2 km section from Shiranuka Station to Kami-Charo Station. The mine located there was then able to expand its production capacity to the maximum. Almost all the coal was now transported by rail. However, the planned replacement of rafting by freight trains did not materialize and timber was transported by truck instead. On September 8, 1972, the line was extended by 7.9 km from Kami-Charo to Hokushin.

The original plan was to connect the Shiranuka Line ending in Hokushin with the Aioi Line at Kitami-Aioi, which would have required the construction of a 5.2 km long tunnel, among other things. The corresponding project was approved in August 1967. In the late 1960s, however, the population began to shrink rapidly after several coal mines in the Charo Valley were forced to close. Under these circumstances, the railroad project was no longer profitable and the Ministry of Transport finally abandoned it in 1972.

After the closure of the last mine, the state railroad ceased freight traffic on October 1, 1978 due to a lack of demand. A youth holiday camp provided additional passenger traffic with special trains during the summer season, However, it became apparent that the line would be closed because it had a very low cost recovery ratio outside the season. Based on the law passed in 1980 to restructure the state railway finances, the state railroad and city authorities agreed to replace the railroad line with a bus line. The closure took place on October 23, 1983.

== Stations ==
All stations are in Shiranuka, Shiranuka District, Hokkaido

Stations		Distance (km)	Connections
Shiranuka	白糠	0.0	Nemuro Main Line
Kami-Shiranuka	上白糠	6.7	
Kyōei	共栄	9.5	
Charo	茶路	11.8	
Nuibetsu	縫別	19.3	
Kami-Charo	上茶路	25.2	
Shimo-Hokushin	下北進	30.7	
Hokushin	北進	33.1	
