= Shiranuka Station =

Railway station in Shiranuka, Hokkaido, Japan

K47 Shiranuka Station 白糠駅
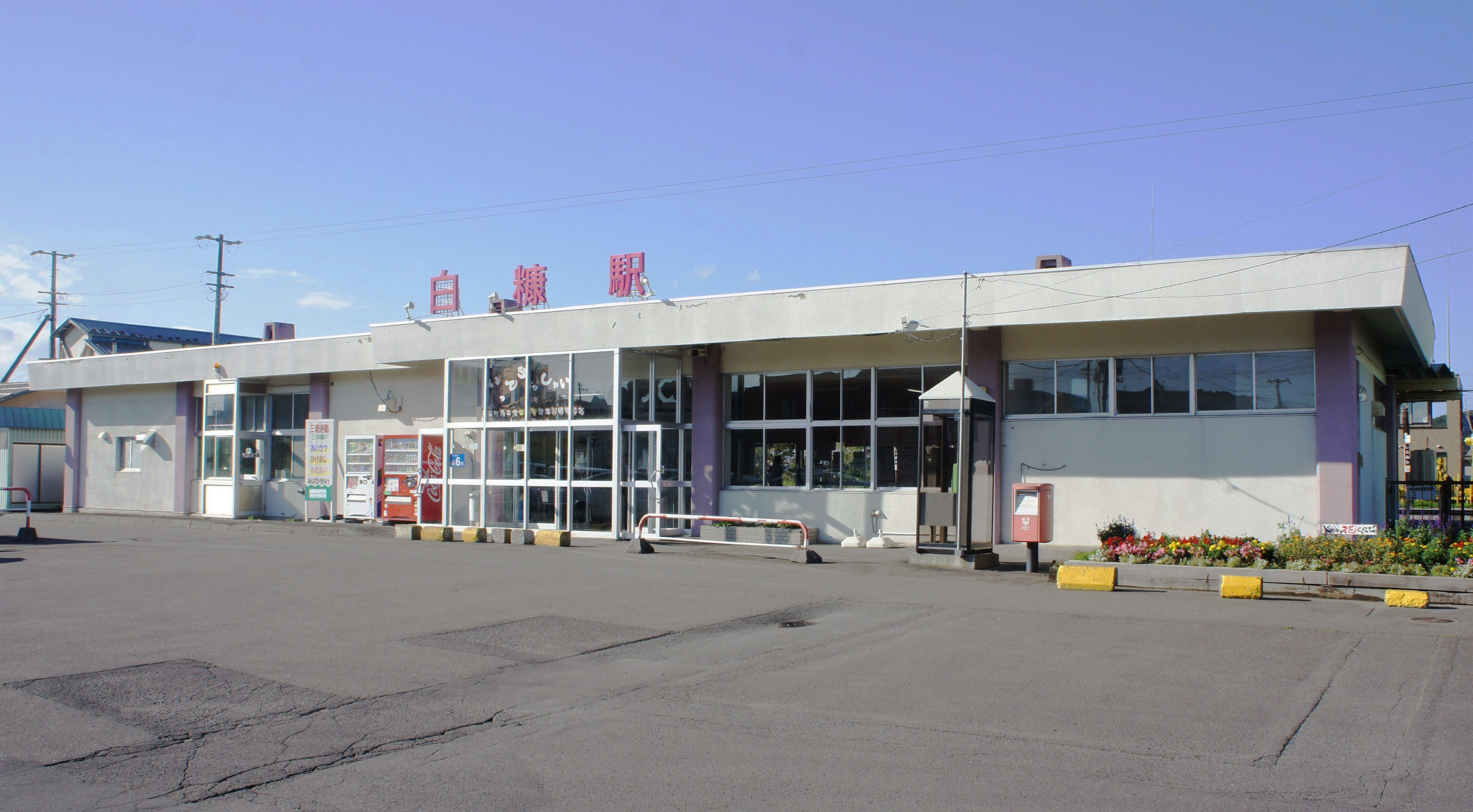
- Station building in September 2018

General information
- Location: 300 Higashi 1-jo Minami 1-chome, Shiranuka-cho, Shiranuka-gun, Hokkaido 088-0301; Japan
- Coordinates: 42°57′22.18″N 144°04′36.76″E
- System: regional rail
- Operator: JR Hokkaido
- Line: Nemuro Main Line
- Distance: 144.8 km from Shintoku
- Platforms: 1 side + 1 island platform
- Tracks: 3

Construction
- Structure type: At-grade
- Accessible: No

Other information
- Status: Staffed (Midori no Madoguchi )
- Station code: K47
- Website: Official website

History
- Opened: 20 July 1901; 125 years ago

Passengers
- FY2018: 39 daily

Services
Preceding station	JR Hokkaido	Following station
Onbetsu towards Takikawa	Nemuro Main Line Local	Nishi-Shoro towards Nemuro
Location
- Location within Hokkaido Location within Japan

Shiranuka Station (白糠駅, Shiranuka-eki) is a railway station located in the town of Shiranuka, Hokkaidō, Japan. It is operated by JR Hokkaido.

== Lines ==
The station is served by the Nemuro Main Line, and lies 144.8 km from the starting point of the line at Shintoku .

== Layout ==
Shiranuka Station has one side platform and one island platform, connected by a footbridge. All trains normally use Platform 1, the main track, adjacent to the station building. Platform 2, serving the secondary track, is used only when trains need to pass. The station has a Midori no Madoguchi staffed ticket office.

=== Platforms ===
1	■ Nemuro Main Line	for Obihiro and Sapporo
2	■ Nemuro Main Line	for Kushiro
3	■ Nemuro Main Line	for Obihiro (to allow for passing trains)

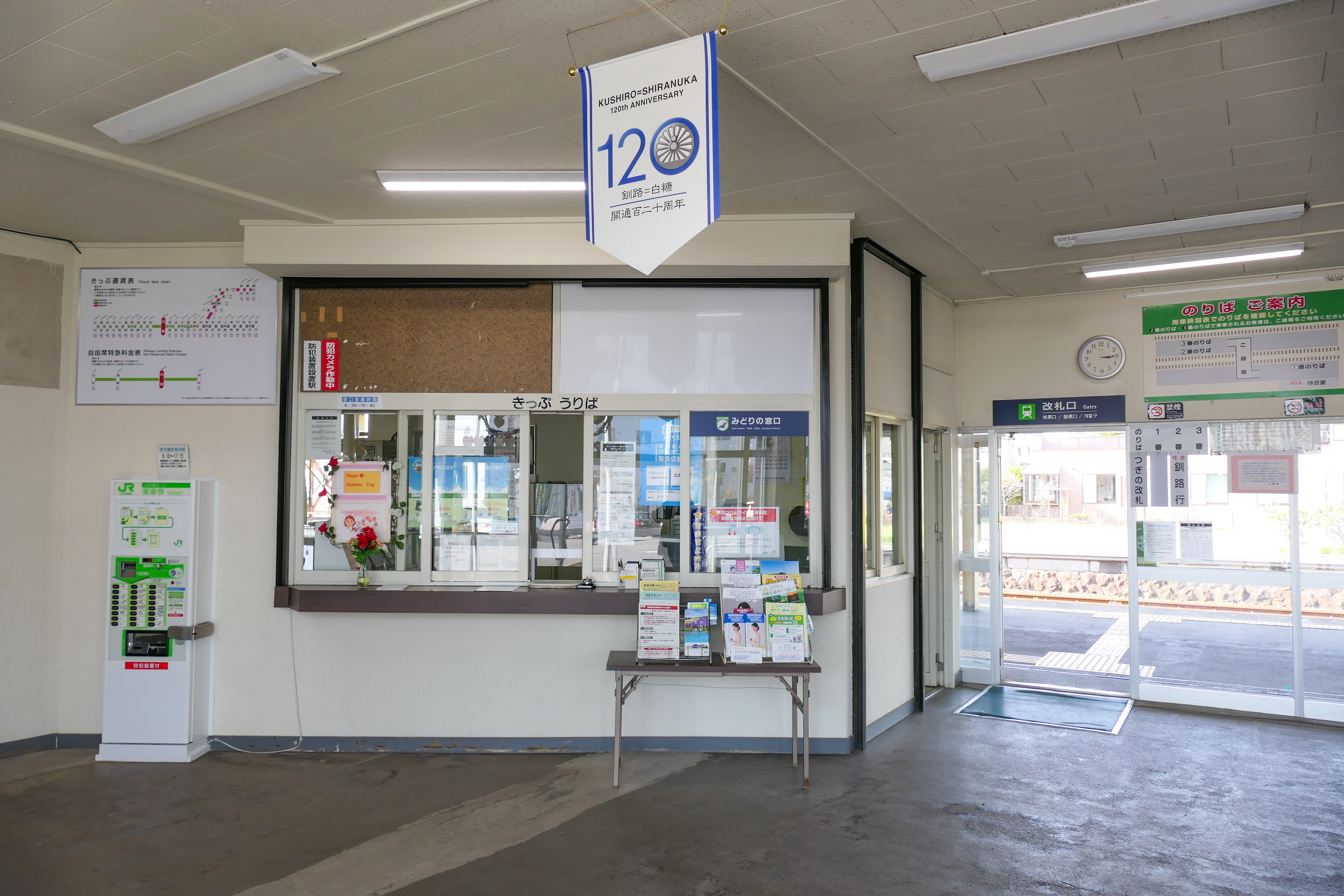
Exit gate

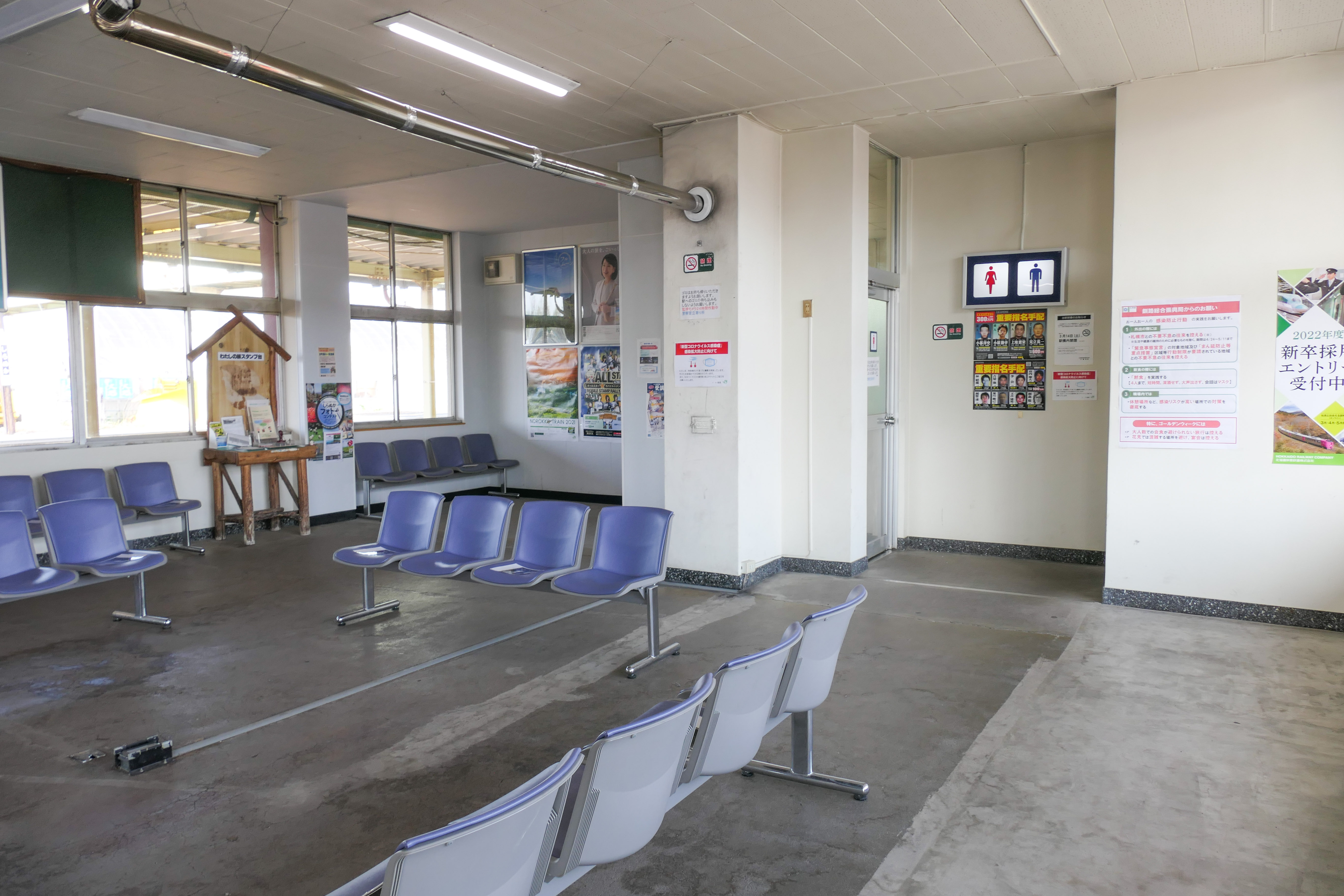
Waiting room

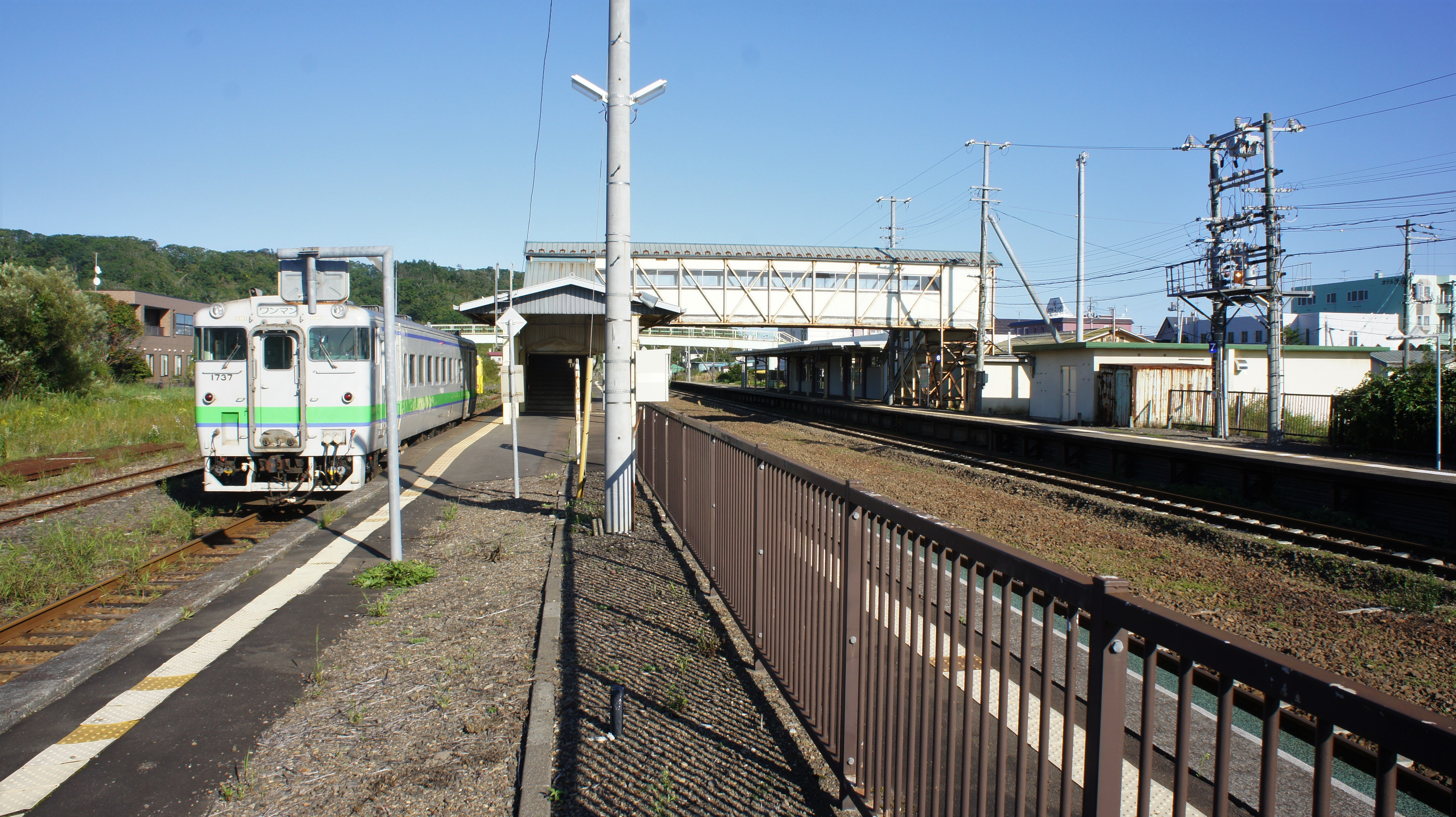
Platform

== History ==
The station opened on 20 July 1901 as a station on the Hokkaidō Kansetsu Tetsudō. It was transferred to the Ministry of Railways on 1 April 1905. The 33.1 kilometer Shiranuka Line operated from this station from 7 October 1964 to its replacement by a bus service on 23 October 1983. Following the privatization of the Japanese National Railways on 1 April 1987, the station came under the control of JR Hokkaido.

== Passenger statistics ==
In fiscal 2018, the station was used by an average of 82 passengers daily.

== Surrounding area ==
- Hokkaido Prefectural Highway 314 Shiranuka Station Line
- Shiranuka Town Hall
- Japan National Route 38

== See also ==
- List of railway stations in Japan
