= Shoro Station =

Railway station in Shiranuka, Hokkaido, Japan

K49 Shoro Station 庶路駅
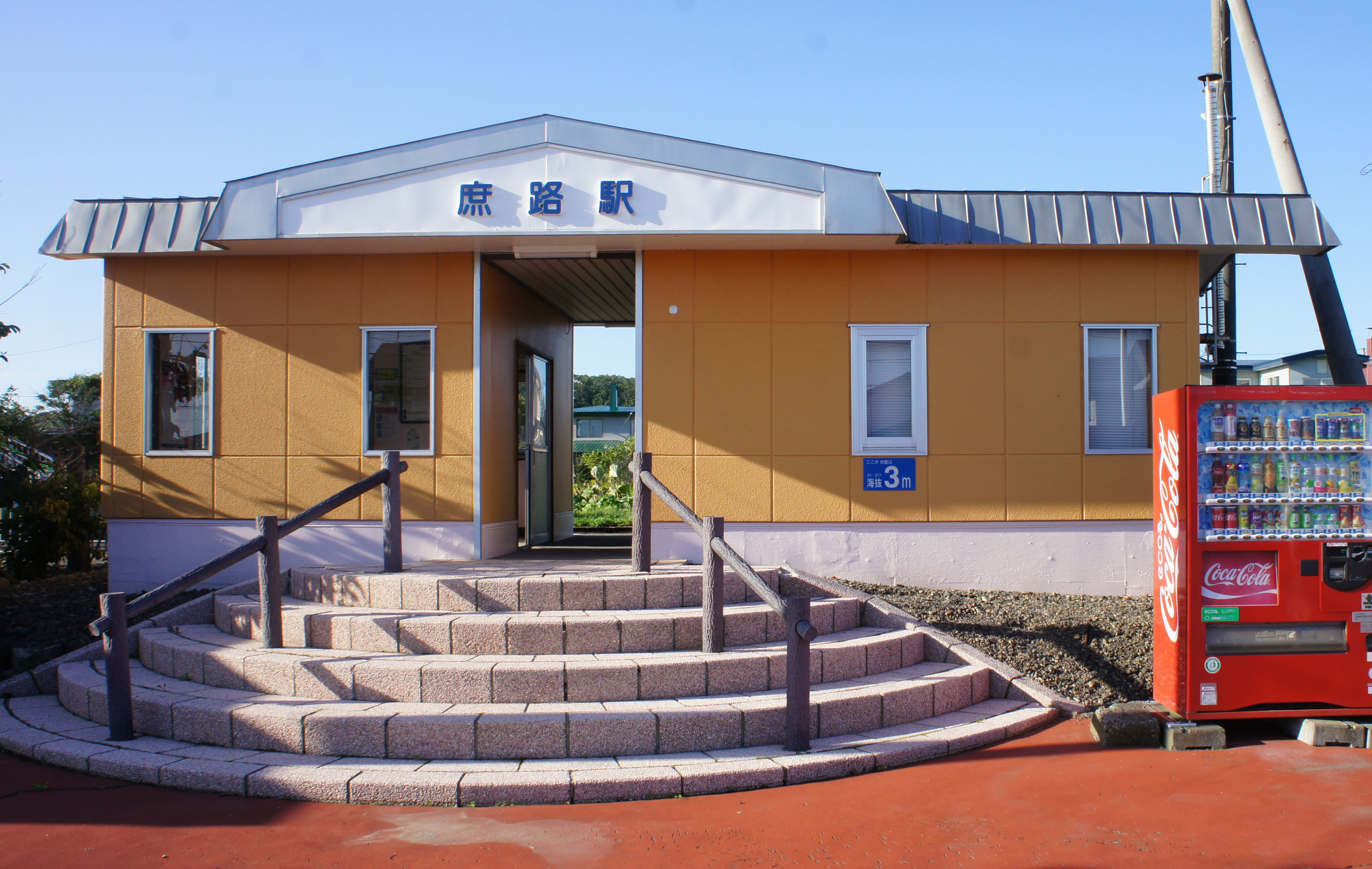
- Station building in September 2018

General information
- Location: 1 Ku Shoro, Shiranuka, Shiranuka District, Hokkaido 088-0567; Japan
- Coordinates: 42°59′1.1″N 144°8′59.95″E
- System: regional rail
- Operator: JR Hokkaido
- Line: Nemuro Main Line
- Distance: 152.3 km from Shintoku
- Platforms: 1 side platform
- Tracks: 1

Construction
- Structure type: At-grade
- Accessible: No

Other information
- Status: Unstaffed
- Station code: K49
- Website: Official website

History
- Opened: 20 July 1901

Passengers
- FY2014: 10 daily

Services
Preceding station	JR Hokkaido	Following station
Nishi-Shoro towards Takikawa	Nemuro Main Line Local	Otanoshike towards Nemuro
Location
- Location within Hokkaido Location within Japan

Shoro Station (庶路駅, Shoro-eki) is a railway station located in the town of Shiranuka, Hokkaidō, Japan. It is operated by JR Hokkaido.

== Lines ==
The station is served by the Nemuro Main Line, and lies 152.3 km from the starting point of the line at Shintoku .

== Layout ==
Shoro Station has one side platform, connected to the station building by an open footbridge. The station is unattended.

=== Platforms ===
1	■ Nemuro Main Line	for Obihiro and Shintoku
2	■ Nemuro Main Line	for Kushiro

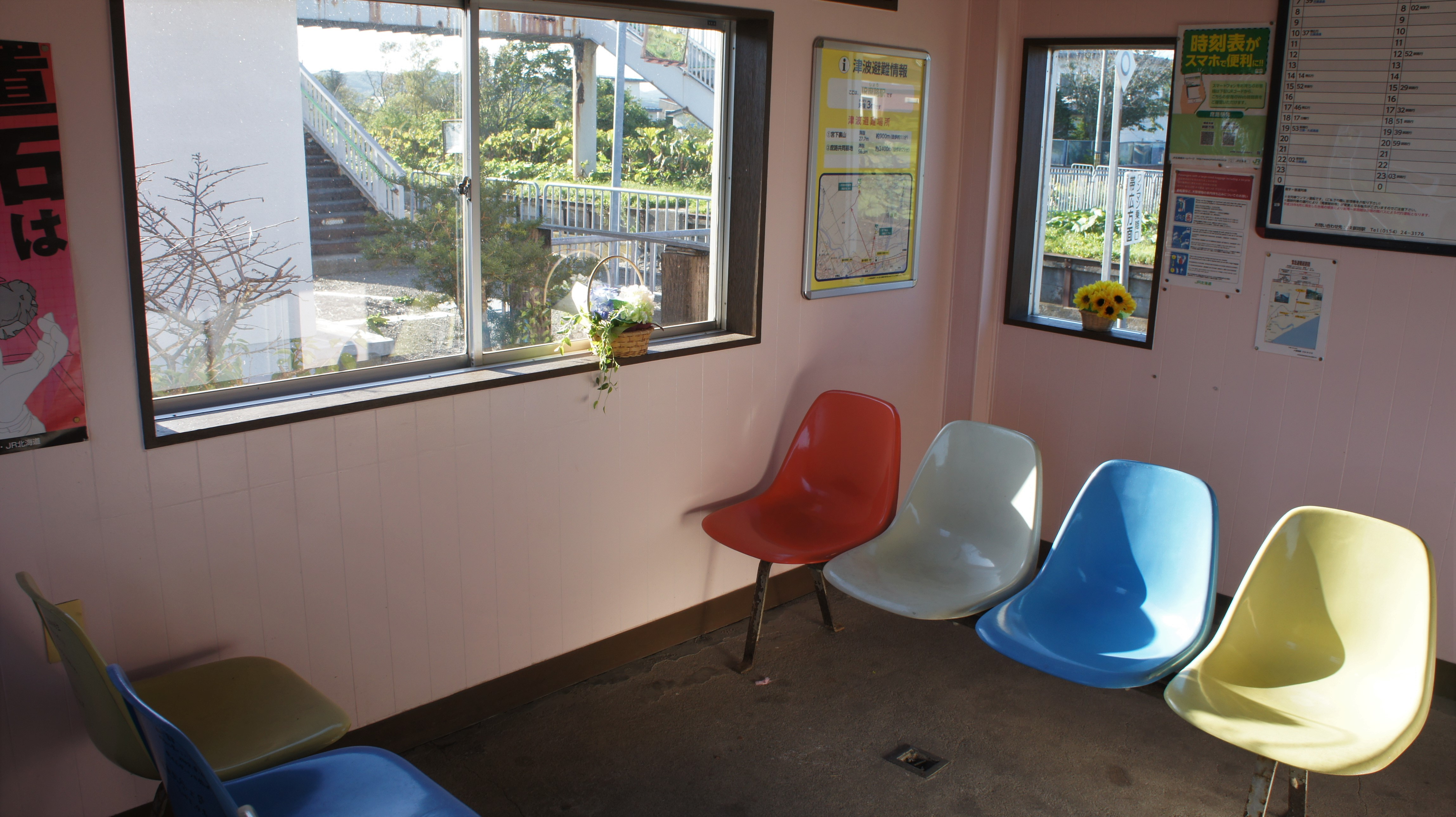
Waiting room

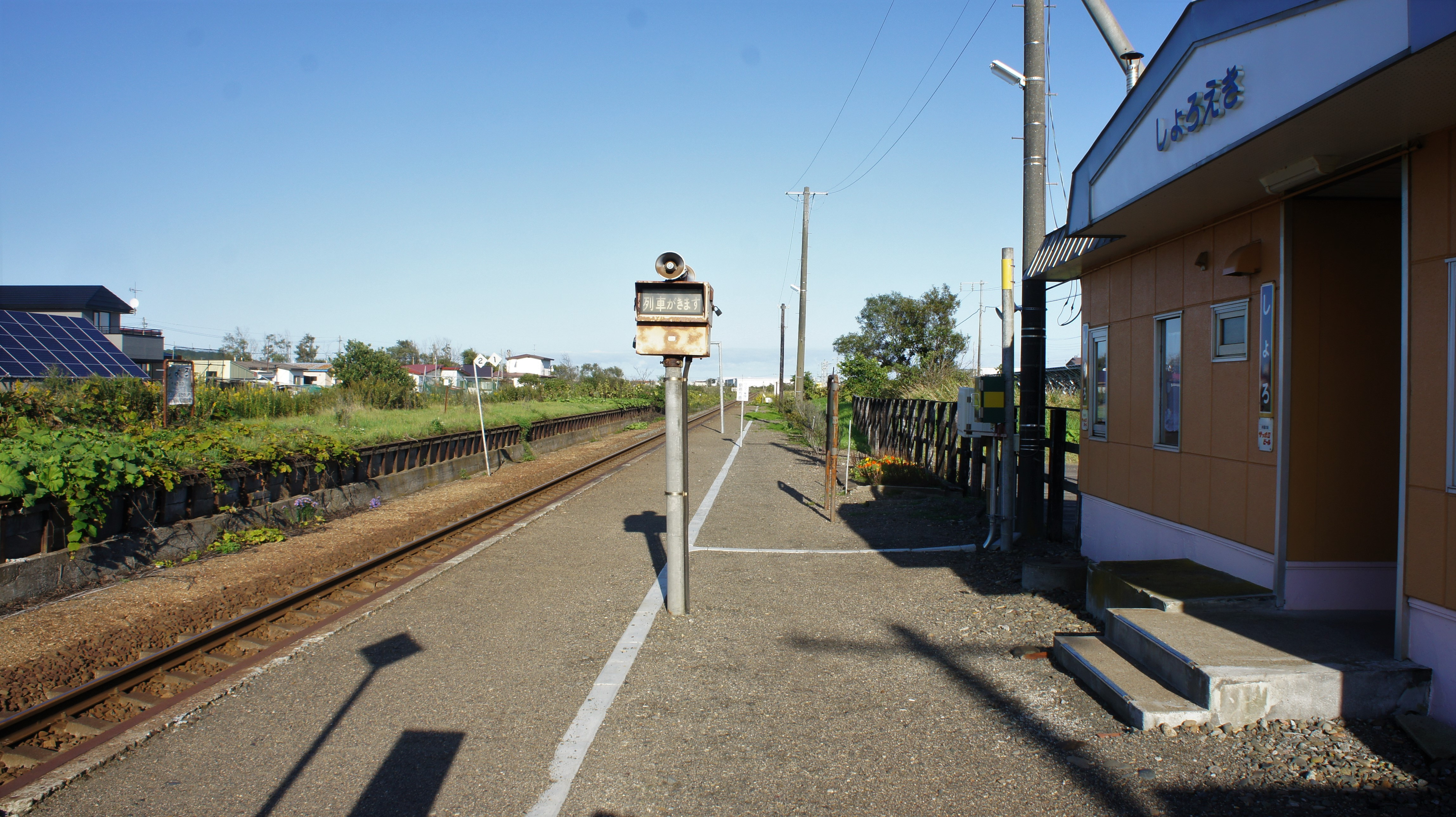
Platform

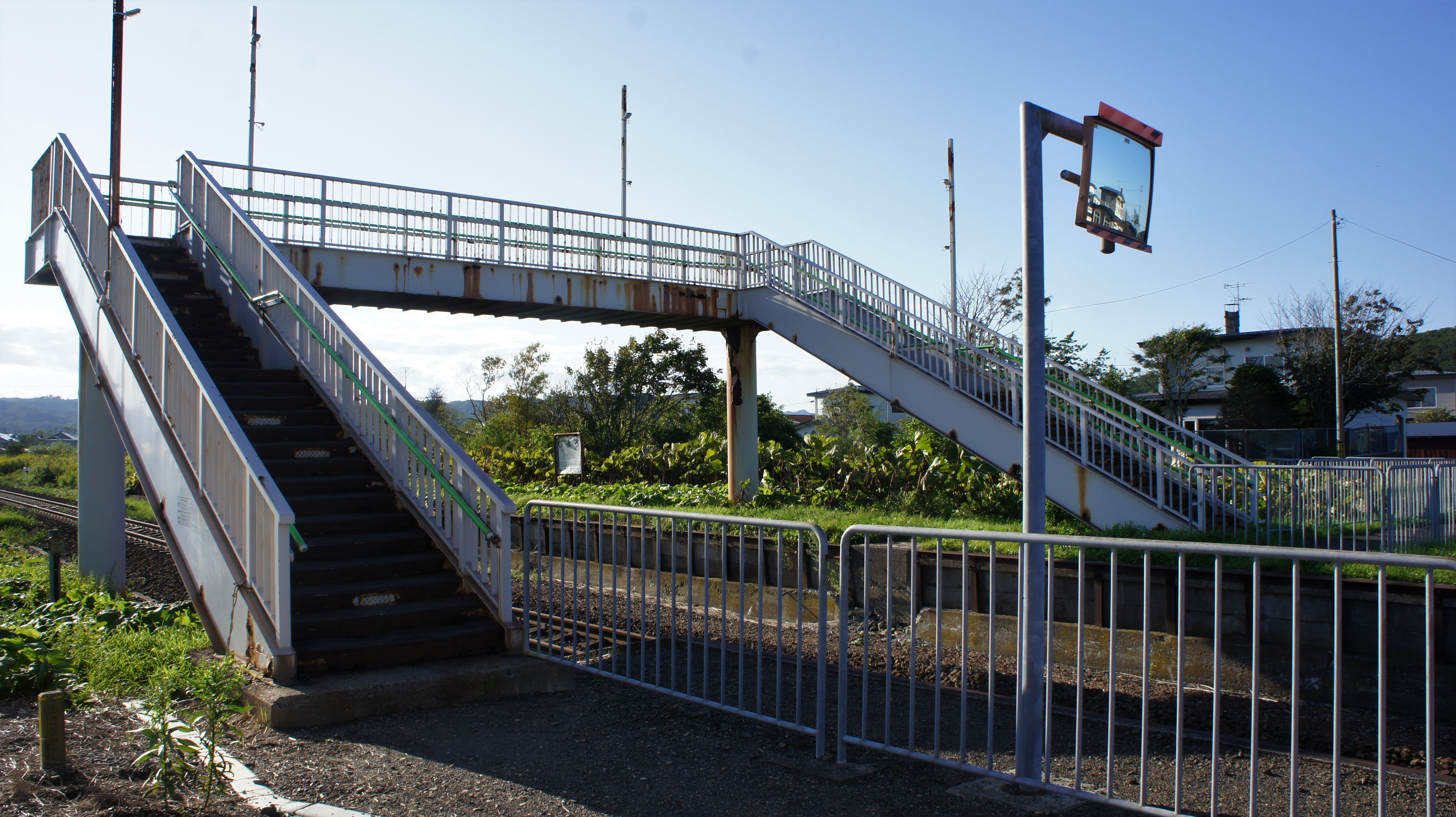
Footbridge

== History ==
The station opened on 20 July 1901 as a station on the Hokkaidō Kansetsu Tetsudō. It was transferred to the Ministry of Railways on 1 April 1905. On 10 November 1974 a head-on collision resulting in derailment, and overturning occurred within the station premises. A second accident occurred on 12 April 1976 with an express train in which seven of the 10-car train derailed and the two rear cars overturned. Following the privatization of the Japanese National Railways on 1 April 1987, the station came under the control of JR Hokkaido.

== Passenger statistics ==
In fiscal 2014, the station was used by an average of 40 passengers daily.

== Surrounding area ==
The Shoro settlement stretches north and south of the station, and is a commuter town for Kushiro City.

- Japan National Route 38
- Hokkaido Route 242 Kamishoji Shoro Station Line
- Kushiro Shiranuka Industrial Park

== See also ==
- List of railway stations in Japan
