= Shiranuka, Hokkaido =

Shiranuka 白糠町 Shiranuka-chō
- Town
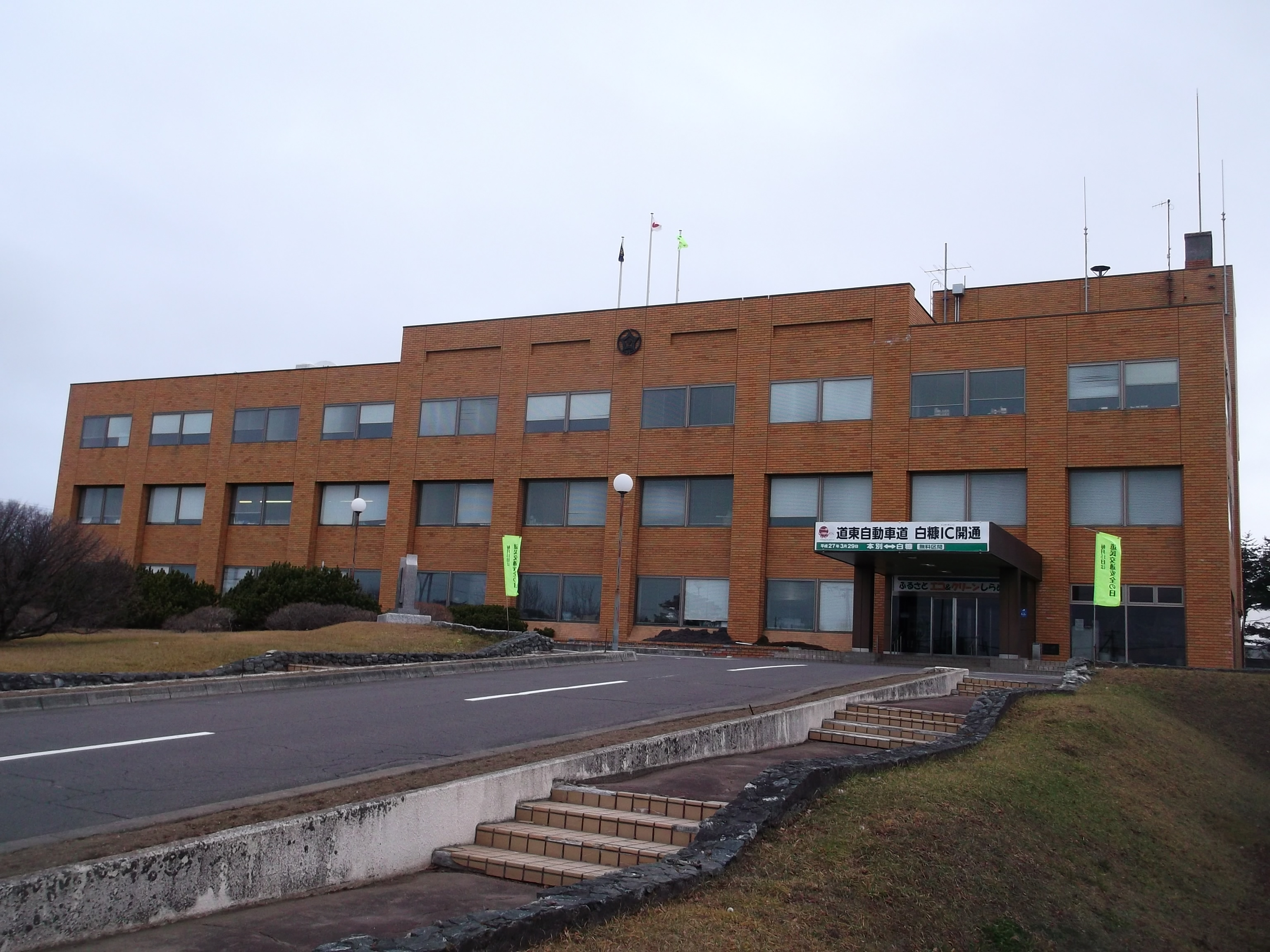
- Shiranuka Town Hall

- Flag Emblem

- Location of Shiranuka in Hokkaido (Kushiro Subprefecture)
- Interactive map of Shiranuka
- Coordinates: 42°57′22″N 144°14′09″E
- Country: Japan
- Region: Hokkaido
- Prefecture: Hokkaido (Kushiro Subprefecture)
- District: Shiranuka

Area
  - Total: 773.13 km^{2} (298.51 sq mi)

Population (October 31, 2025)
  - Total: 6,874
  - Density: 8.891/km^{2} (23.03/sq mi)
- Time zone: UTC+09:00 (JST)
- City hall address: 1-1-1 Nishi 1-jo Minami 1-chome, Shiranuka-cho, Shiranuka-gun, Hokkaido, 088-0392
- Climate: Dfb
- Website: www.town.shiranuka.lg.jp
- Symbols
- Flower: Common marigold
- Tree: Japanese rowan

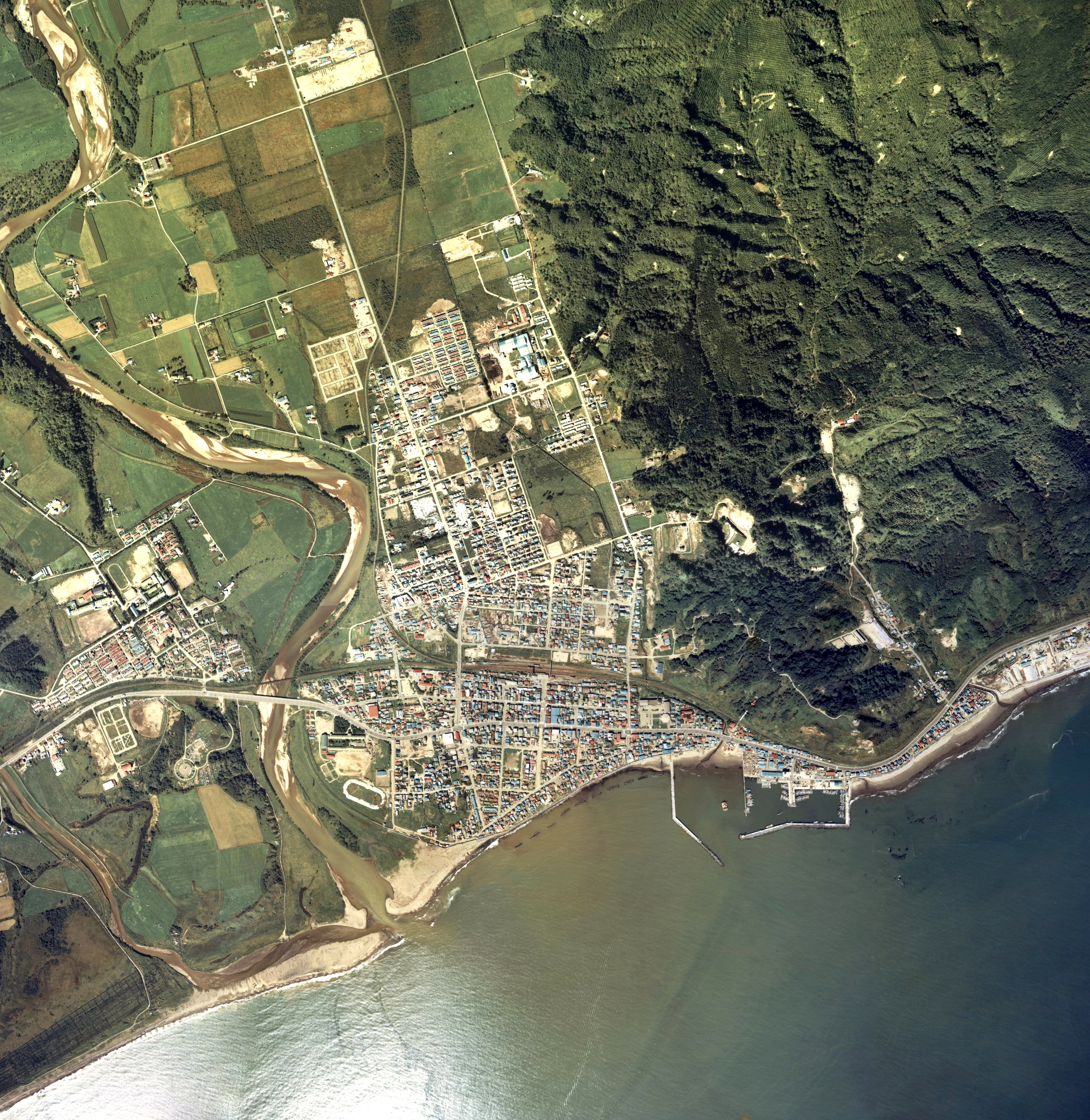
Shiranuka town center area Aerial photograph

Shiranuka (白糠町, Shiranuka-chō) is a town located in Kushiro Subprefecture, Hokkaidō, Japan. As of 31 October 2025, the town had an estimated population of 6,874 in 3900 households, and a population density of 10.9 people per km^{2}. The total area of the town is 773.13 km^{2} (298.51 sq mi).

== Geography ==
Shiranuka is located in the western part of the Kushiro Subprefecture, at the mouth of the Charo River into the Pacific Ocean. It is approximately 30 kilometers west of central Kushiro City. The town is sandwiched between two enclaves of Kushiro City on either side. It is approximately 90 kilometers east of Obihiro City. The northern part of the town tends to be at a higher elevation. Japan National Route 38 and the Nemuro Main Line railway run east–west along the Pacific coast in the south. Shiranuka Town Hall is located near Shiranuka Station on the Nemuro Main Line, and it is also close to Shiranuka Port. The Senshiro Industrial Park was developed near the administrative border with Kushiro City at the eastern end of the town. The majority of the population is concentrated along the coast. The runway of Kushiro Airport straddles the administrative border with Kushiro City.

=== Neighboring municipalities ===
  - Kushiro
  - Ashoro
  - Honbetsu
  - Urahoro

=== Climate ===
According to the Köppen climate classification, Shiranuka Town has a humid continental climate. Its climate is characterized by large temperature fluctuations, as well as large annual and daily temperature ranges. Even within the cold zone, Shiranuka receives significant snowfall and is designated as a heavy snow zone. In winter, temperatures below -20 °C are not uncommon, making it extremely cold. In summer, due to the influence of the Kuril Current, dense fog can occur along the coast, with a maximum temperature of around 20 °C in summer. Snowfall tends to be slightly lower than the rest of Hokkaido, and the local region is known for a high proportion of overcast or foggy days.

Climate data for Shiranuka (1991−2020 normals, extremes 1977−present)
Month	Jan	Feb	Mar	Apr	May	Jun	Jul	Aug	Sep	Oct	Nov	Dec	Year
Record high °C (°F)	8.2 (46.8)	9.1 (48.4)	15.6 (60.1)	26.4 (79.5)	30.9 (87.6)	31.1 (88.0)	33.3 (91.9)	35.5 (95.9)	31.3 (88.3)	23.1 (73.6)	21.2 (70.2)	13.1 (55.6)	35.5 (95.9)
Mean daily maximum °C (°F)	−0.3 (31.5)	−0.2 (31.6)	3.4 (38.1)	8.8 (47.8)	13.4 (56.1)	16.3 (61.3)	20.0 (68.0)	21.9 (71.4)	20.2 (68.4)	15.3 (59.5)	8.8 (47.8)	2.3 (36.1)	10.8 (51.5)
Daily mean °C (°F)	−6.2 (20.8)	−5.9 (21.4)	−1.4 (29.5)	3.5 (38.3)	8.3 (46.9)	12.0 (53.6)	16.0 (60.8)	17.8 (64.0)	15.4 (59.7)	9.5 (49.1)	3.2 (37.8)	−3.3 (26.1)	5.7 (42.3)
Mean daily minimum °C (°F)	−13.0 (8.6)	−13.0 (8.6)	−7.2 (19.0)	−1.8 (28.8)	3.3 (37.9)	8.3 (46.9)	12.8 (55.0)	14.6 (58.3)	11.0 (51.8)	3.6 (38.5)	−2.8 (27.0)	−9.5 (14.9)	0.5 (32.9)
Record low °C (°F)	−26.5 (−15.7)	−29.2 (−20.6)	−20.8 (−5.4)	−14.6 (5.7)	−7.2 (19.0)	−1.9 (28.6)	2.9 (37.2)	5.3 (41.5)	−0.5 (31.1)	−6.5 (20.3)	−13.4 (7.9)	−22.9 (−9.2)	−29.2 (−20.6)
Average precipitation mm (inches)	38.3 (1.51)	25.6 (1.01)	53.9 (2.12)	82.2 (3.24)	123.1 (4.85)	113.3 (4.46)	132.5 (5.22)	148.9 (5.86)	170.4 (6.71)	119.6 (4.71)	63.6 (2.50)	55.0 (2.17)	1,119.1 (44.06)
Average snowfall cm (inches)	77 (30)	71 (28)	78 (31)	14 (5.5)	0 (0)	0 (0)	0 (0)	0 (0)	0 (0)	0 (0)	8 (3.1)	49 (19)	298 (117)
Average precipitation days (≥ 1.0 mm)	5.0	4.3	7.2	8.8	10.3	9.5	11.0	11.6	10.8	8.6	8.1	6.6	101.8
Average snowy days (≥ 3 cm)	9.4	9.4	10.6	1.9	0	0	0	0	0	0	0.9	5.8	38
Mean monthly sunshine hours	187.0	183.4	197.4	182.2	172.1	128.7	112.7	123.0	140.8	174.3	170.0	177.6	1,949.2
Source: Japan Meteorological Agency

=== Demographics ===
Per Japanese census data, the population of Shiranuka has declined in recent decades.

Historical population
Year	Pop.	±%
1970	15,482	—
1980	14,514	−6.3%
1990	13,301	−8.4%
2000	11,359	−14.6%
2010	9,291	−18.2%
2020	7,289	−21.5%

== History ==
During the Edo period, the Shiranuka Basho, a trading post called Shiranuka Basho was established in 1632 for commerce between Matsumae Domain and the indigenous Ainu people. It is believed that the name "Shiranuka" comes from the Ainu language, as roughly "the place where the tide passes over the rocky shore". In 1800, a group of 50 Japanese colonists from Hachioji settled in Shiranuka. The first coal mine in the area was opened in 1857 by the Tokugawa shogunate, coal mining was important to the local economy until the modern period. On 1 April 1915, Shiranuka village was established as a second-class village. It was elevated to town status on 1 November 1950. In 2005, residents rejected a referendum to merge with neighboring Kushiro city.

== Government ==
Shiranuka has a mayor-council form of government with a directly elected mayor and a unicameral town council of 12 members. Shiranuka, as part of Kushiro Subprefecture, contributes one member to the Hokkaidō Prefectural Assembly. In terms of national politics, the town is part of the Hokkaidō 7th district of the lower house of the Diet of Japan.

== Economy ==
Following the closure of its coal mines, dairy farming and Commercial fishing are the mainstays of the local. In terms of industry, food processing and power generation are prominent. Forestry is also active, with plywood manufacturing being a forestry-related industry. The Kushiro Shiranuka Industrial Park is located at the southeastern edge of the town, and is home to mainly light industry and food processing companies. A light industry park is also located in the western part of the Nishishoji district. The entire Kushiro City and Shiranuka Town area has been designated the Kushiro-Shiranuka Next-Generation Energy Special Zone, and efforts are being made to concentrate dimethyl ether research and supply bases. Due to this relationship, the area is home to a cluster of renewable energy power plants, including wood biomass power plants and mega solar power plants.

== Education ==
Shiranuka has one public elementary school and one public middle school operated by the town government and one public high school operated by the Hokkaido Board of Education. The Hokkaido Board of Education also operates one special education school for the handicapped.

== Transportation ==
JR Hokkaido - Nemuro Main Line

■ Shiranuka - Nishi-Shoro - Shoro

=== Highways ===
- Dōtō Expressway
- National Route 38
- National Route 274
- National Route 392

== Local attractions ==
Although not a tourist destination in itself, Shiranuka is well placed for nearby attractions. Kushiro wetlands have become famous in Japan since the recovery of the crane population, and Akan National Park is approximately an hours drive from the town. Shiretoko National Park (one of Japan's three World Natural Heritage Sites) is slightly further, but still accessible within 3 hours by car. The town has a large population of Sika deer, which are consequently something of a local delicacy.

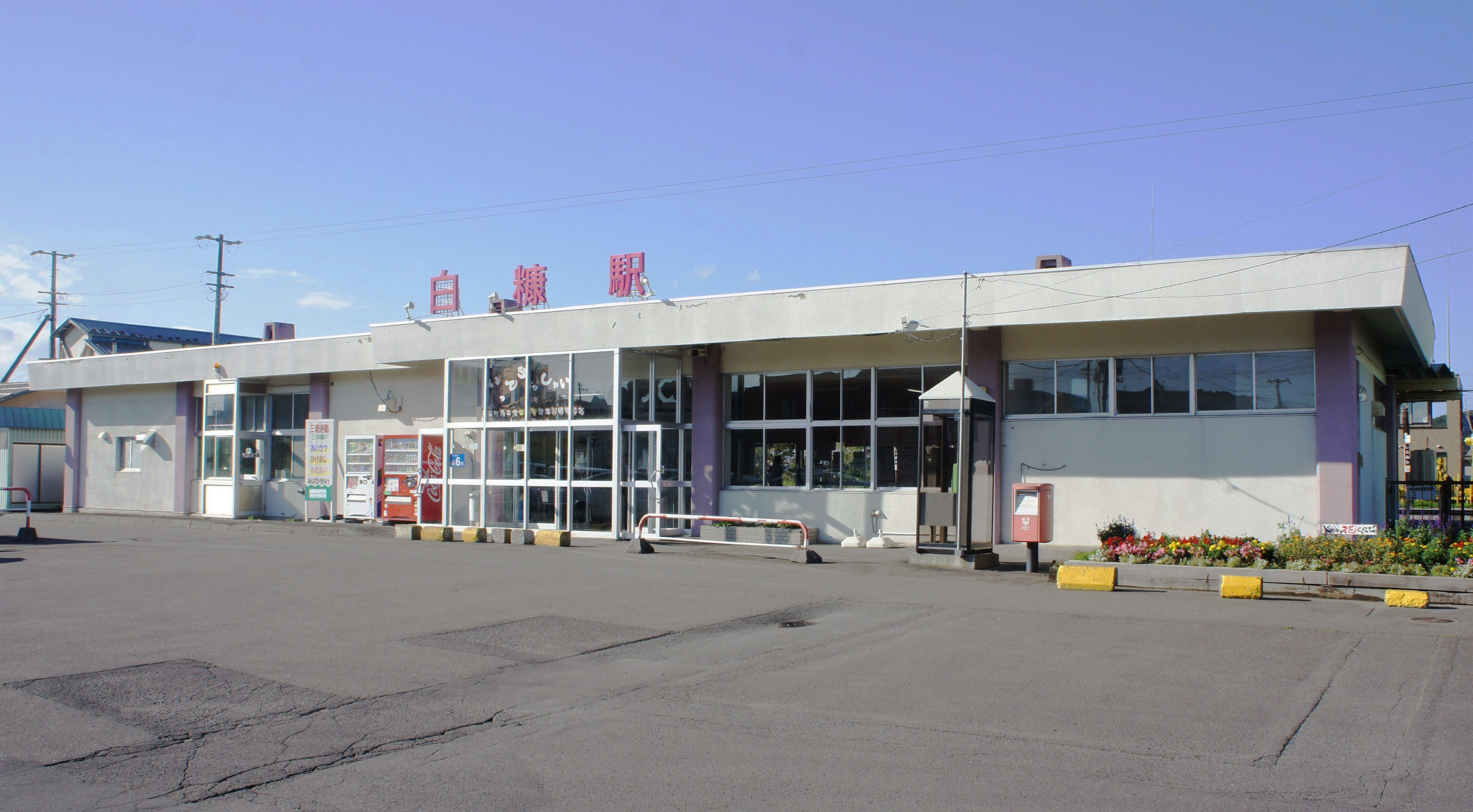
Shiranuka railway station

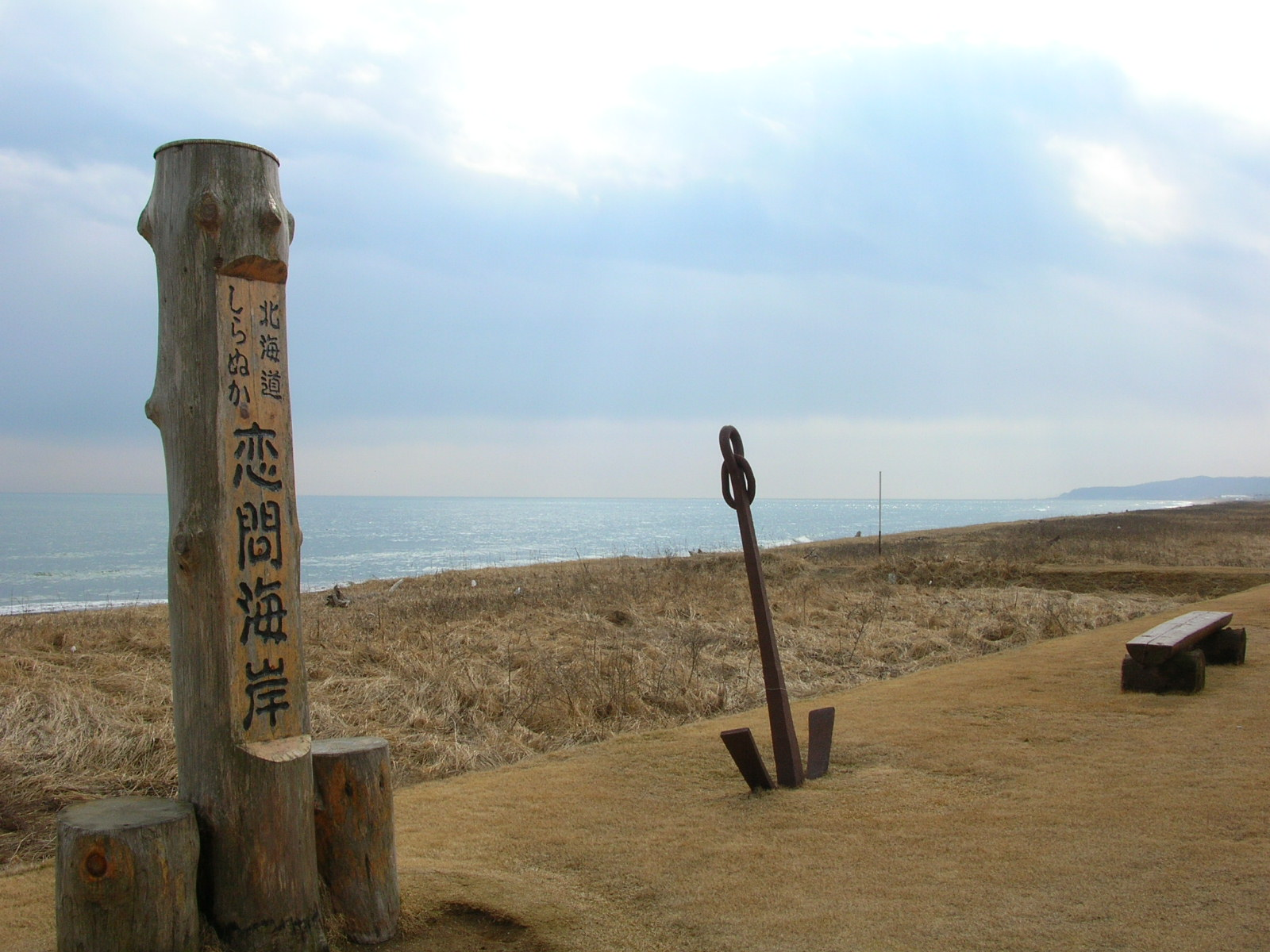
Koitoi Beach

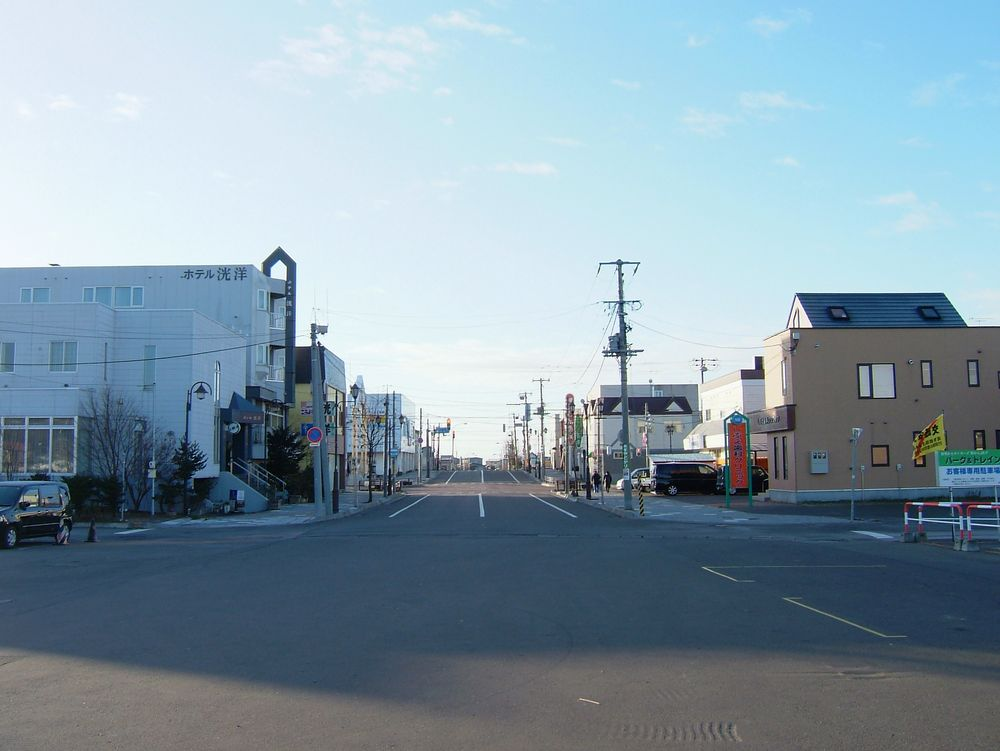
View from Shiranuka Station

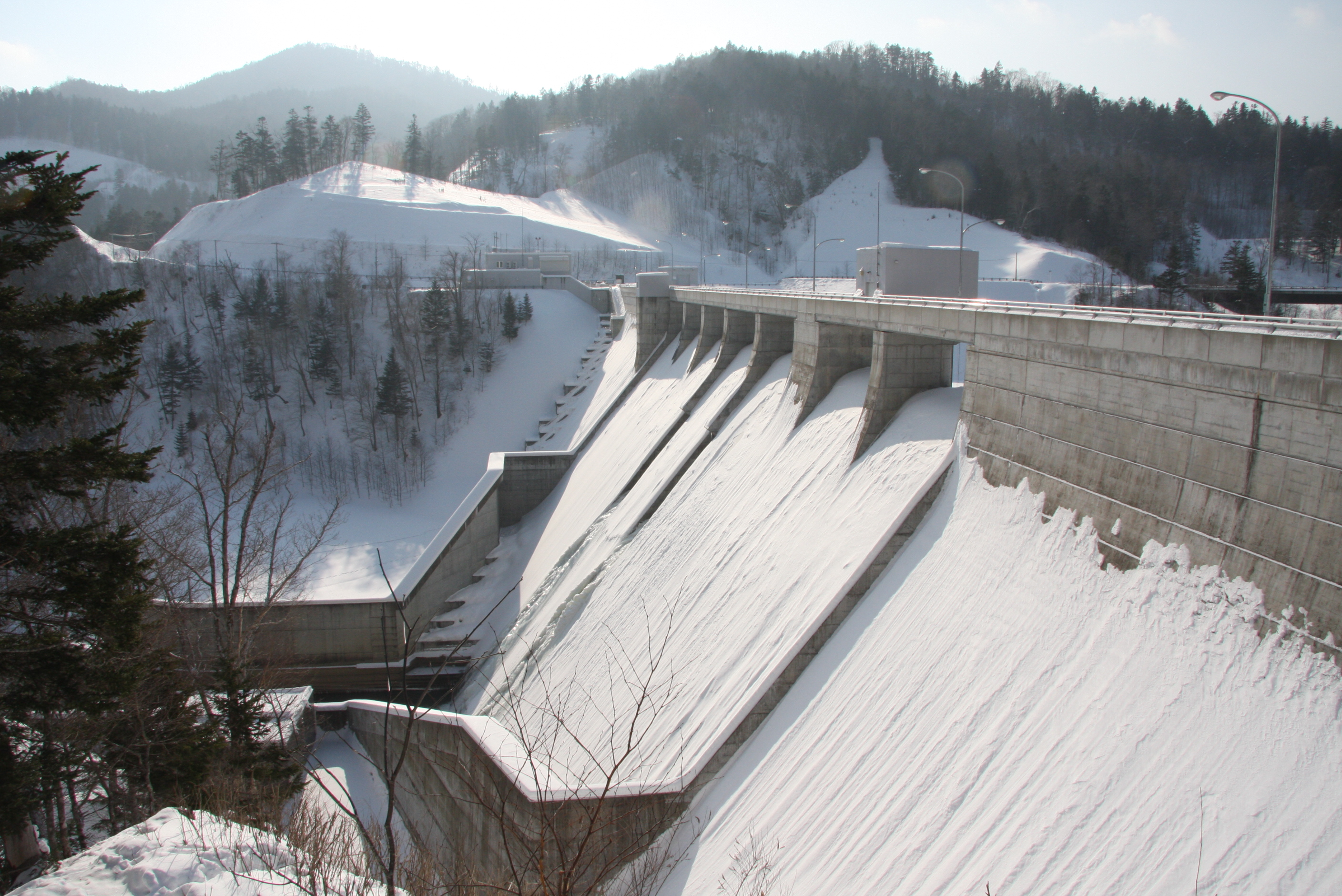
Shoro Dam

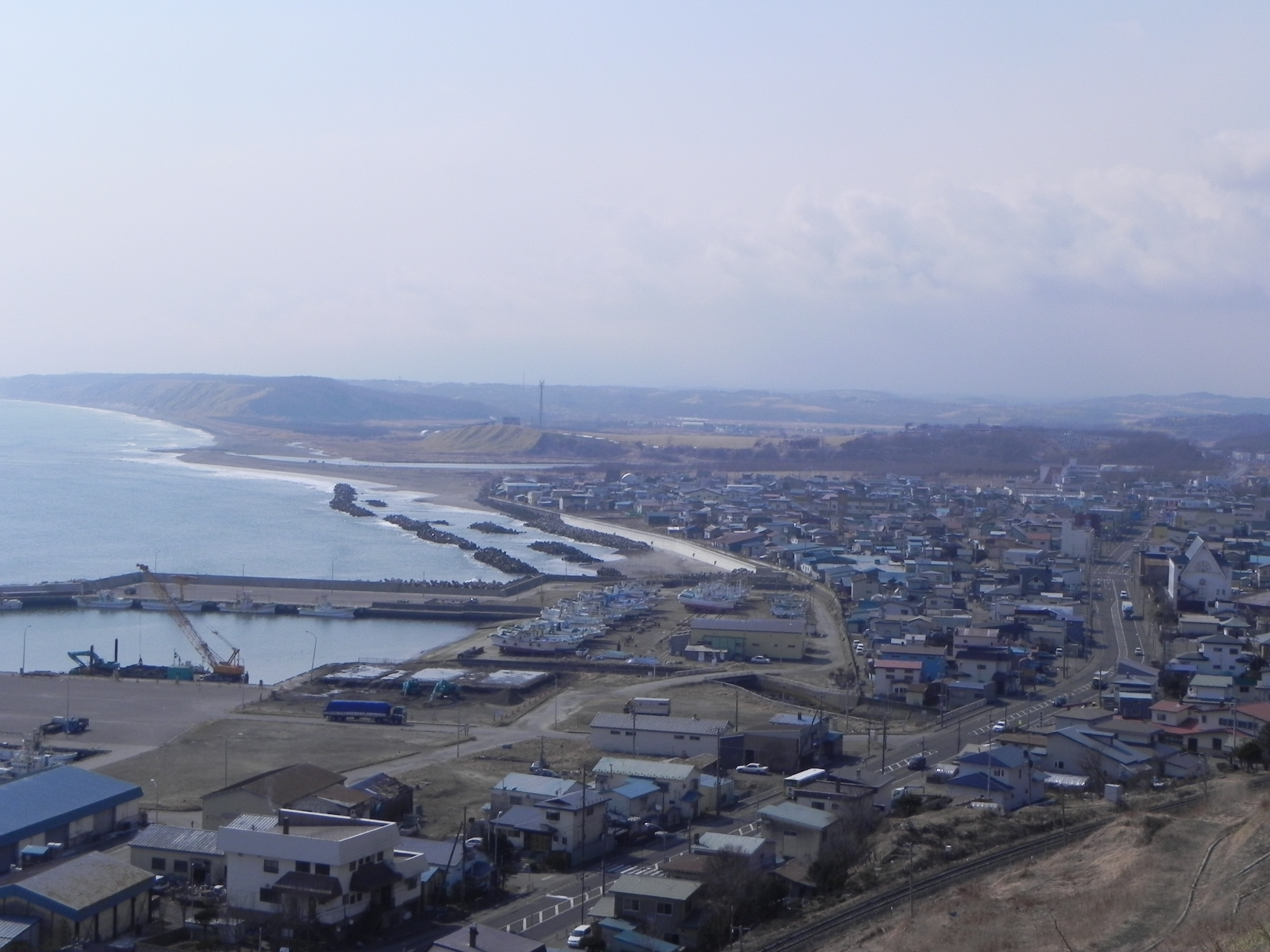
Shiranuka panorama

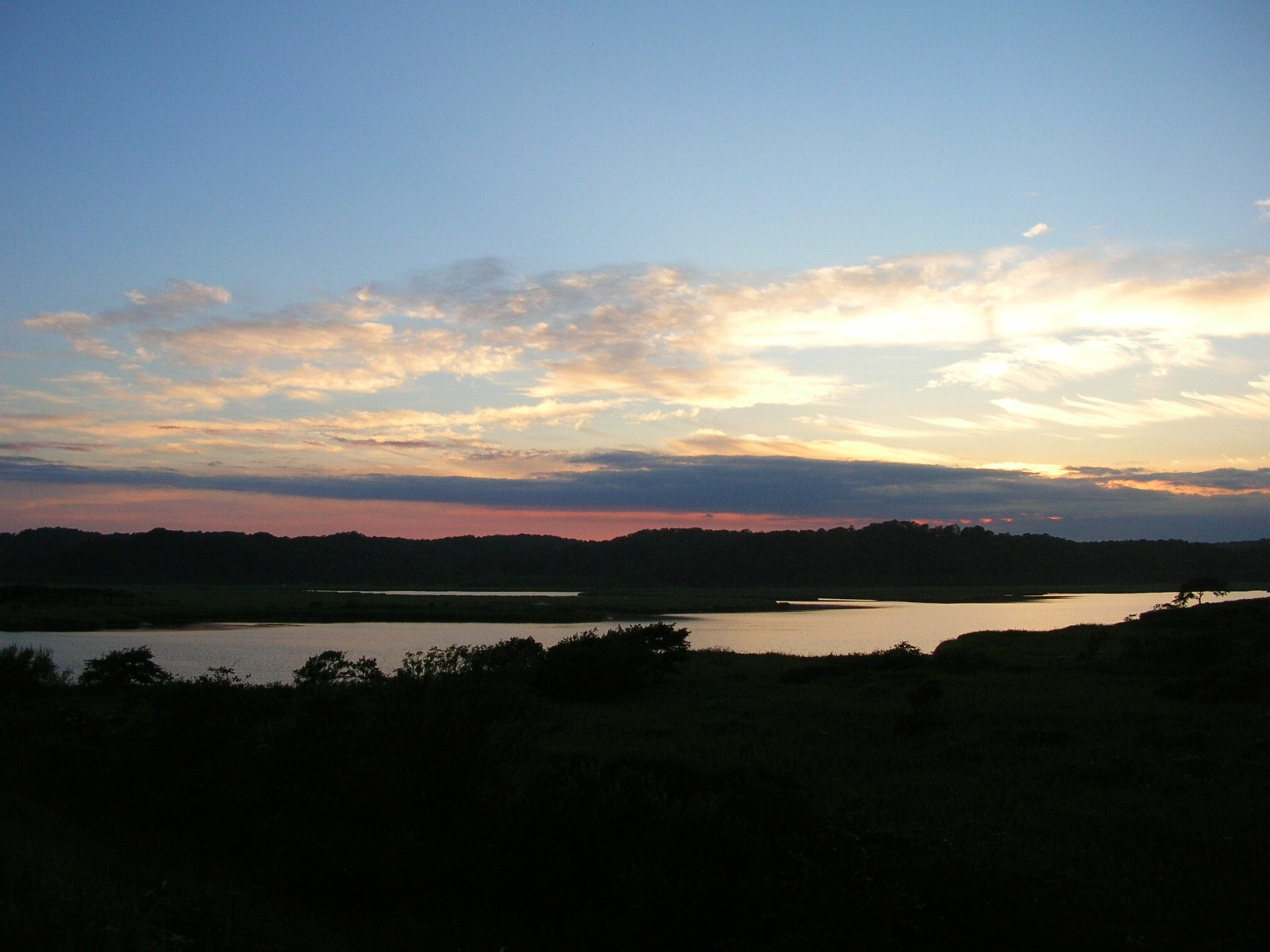
Sunset at Pashikuru

== Mascots ==
Milkcook and Kurobe Happy, the town's mascots

Shiranuka's mascots is Koita-kun (コイタくん) and Meika-chan (メイカちゃん). They met in Shiranuka Koitoi Michi-no-Eki.

- Koita is a red willow octopus from Shiranuka.
- Meika is a white flying squid from Kyushu.
