= Nishi-Shoro Station =

Railway station in Shiranuka, Hokkaido, Japan

K48 Nishi-Shoro Station 西庶路駅
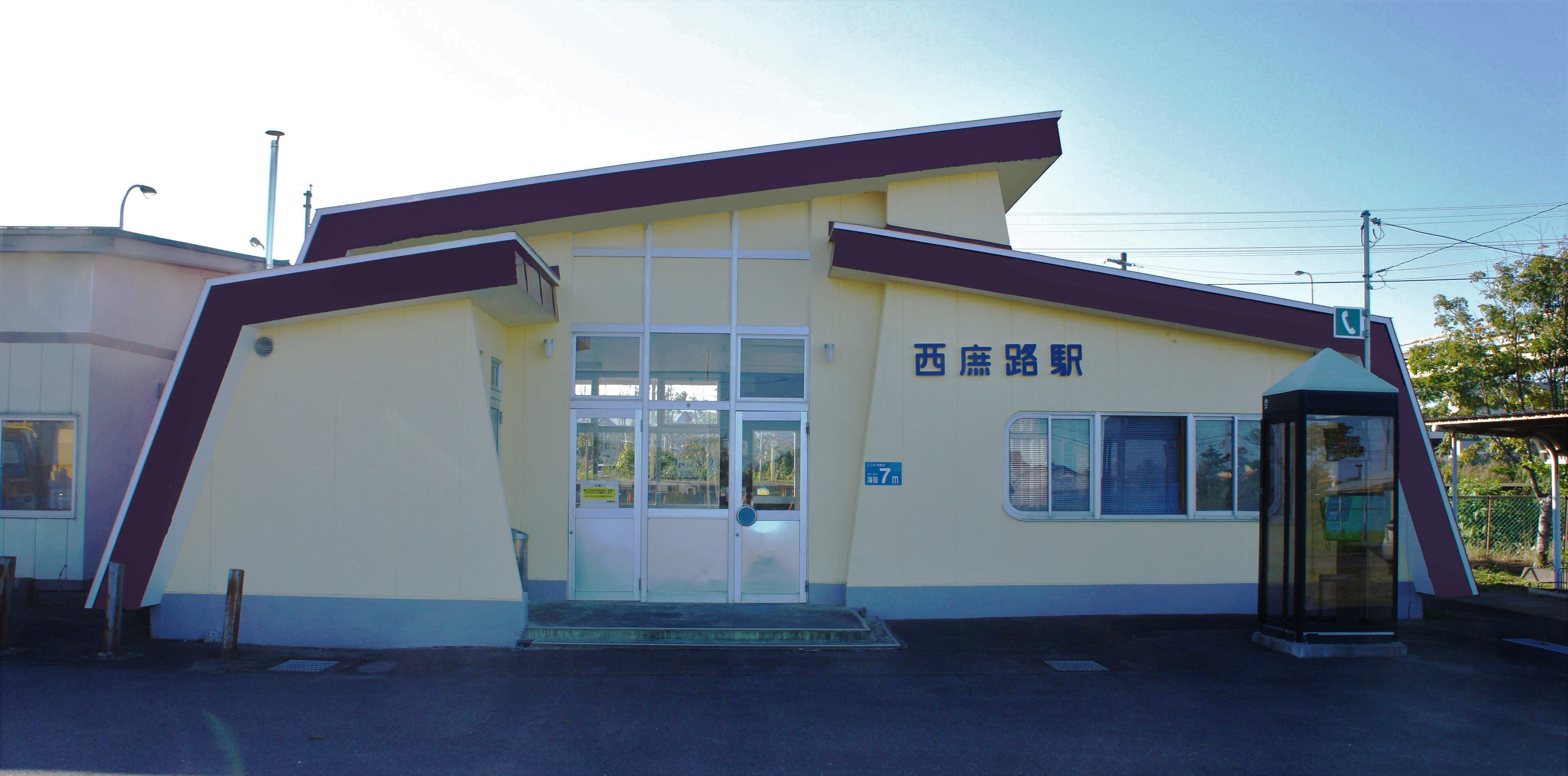
- Station building in September 2018

General information
- Location: 3 Chome Nishishoro Nishi 1 Jominami, Shiranuka, Shiranuka District, Hokkaido 088-0572; Japan
- Coordinates: 42°58′34.1″N 144°7′47.37″E
- System: regional rail
- Operator: JR Hokkaido
- Line: Nemuro Main Line
- Distance: 150.2 km from Shintoku
- Platforms: 1 island platform
- Tracks: 2

Construction
- Structure type: At-grade
- Accessible: No

Other information
- Status: Unstaffed
- Station code: K48
- Website: Official website

History
- Opened: 5 March 1952

Passengers
- FY2014: 40 daily

Services
| Preceding station | JR Hokkaido | Following station |
|---|---|---|
| Shiranuka towards Takikawa | Nemuro Main Line Local | Shoro towards Nemuro |
Location
- Location within Hokkaido Location within Japan

Nishi-Shoro Station (西庶路駅, Nishi-Shoro-eki) is a railway station located in the town of Shiranuka, Hokkaidō, Japan. It is operated by JR Hokkaido.

== Lines ==
The station is served by the Nemuro Main Line, and lies 150.2 km from the starting point of the line at Shintoku .

== Layout ==
Nishi-Shoro Station has one island platform, connected to the station building by an open footbridge. The station is unattended.

=== Platforms ===
| 1 | ■ Nemuro Main Line | for Obihiro and Shintoku |
| 2 | ■ Nemuro Main Line | for Kushiro |

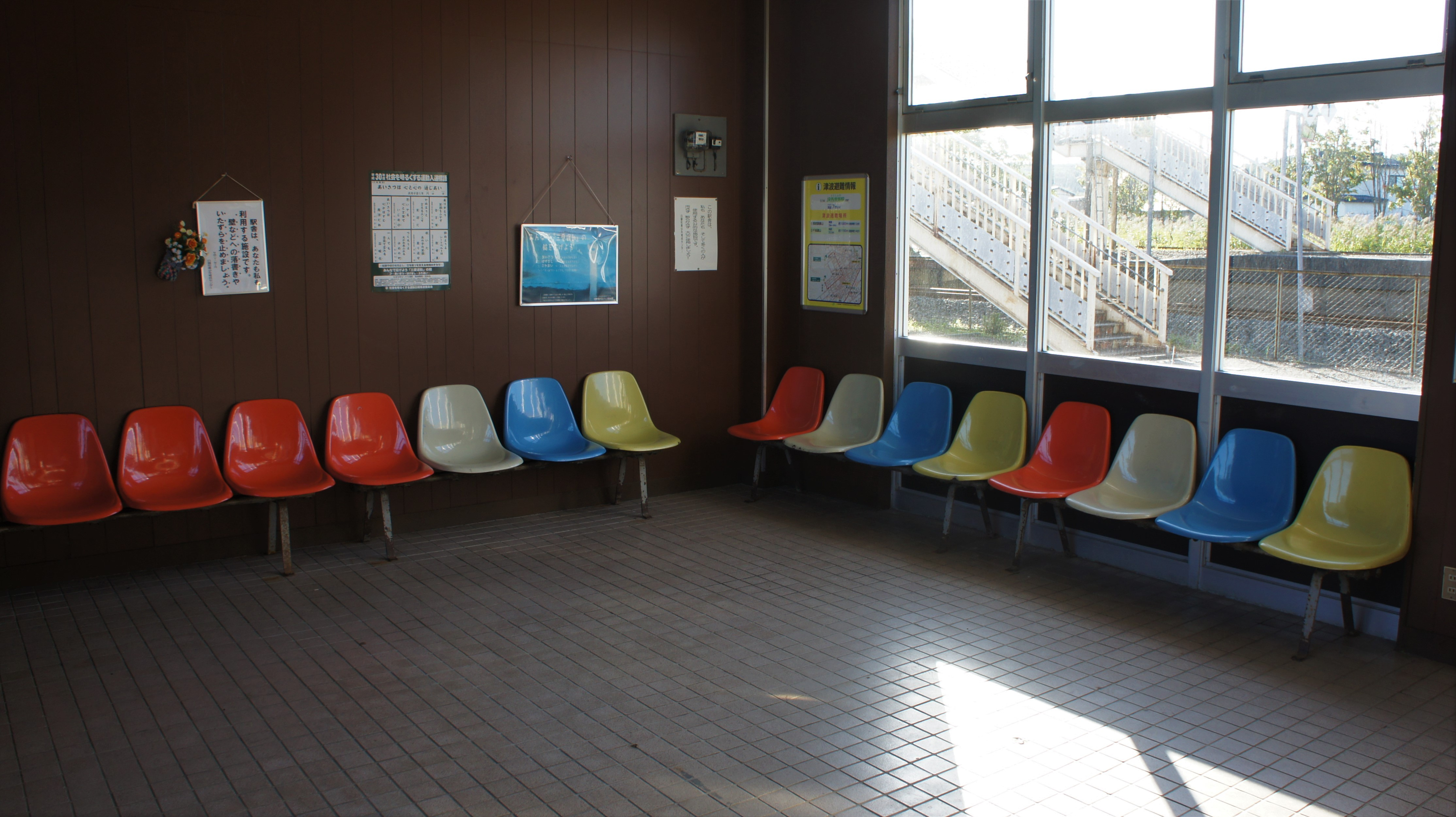
Waiting room

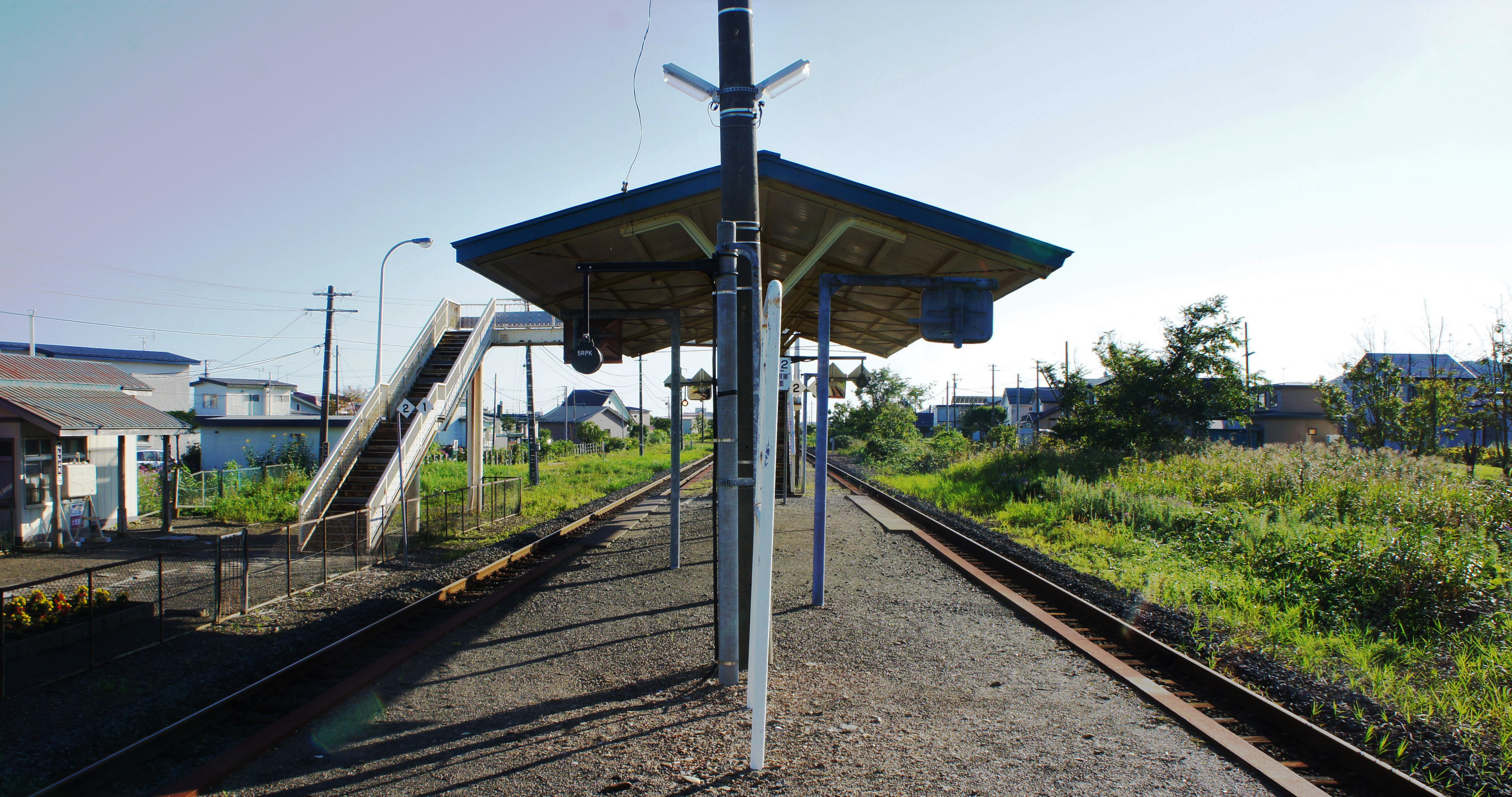
Platform

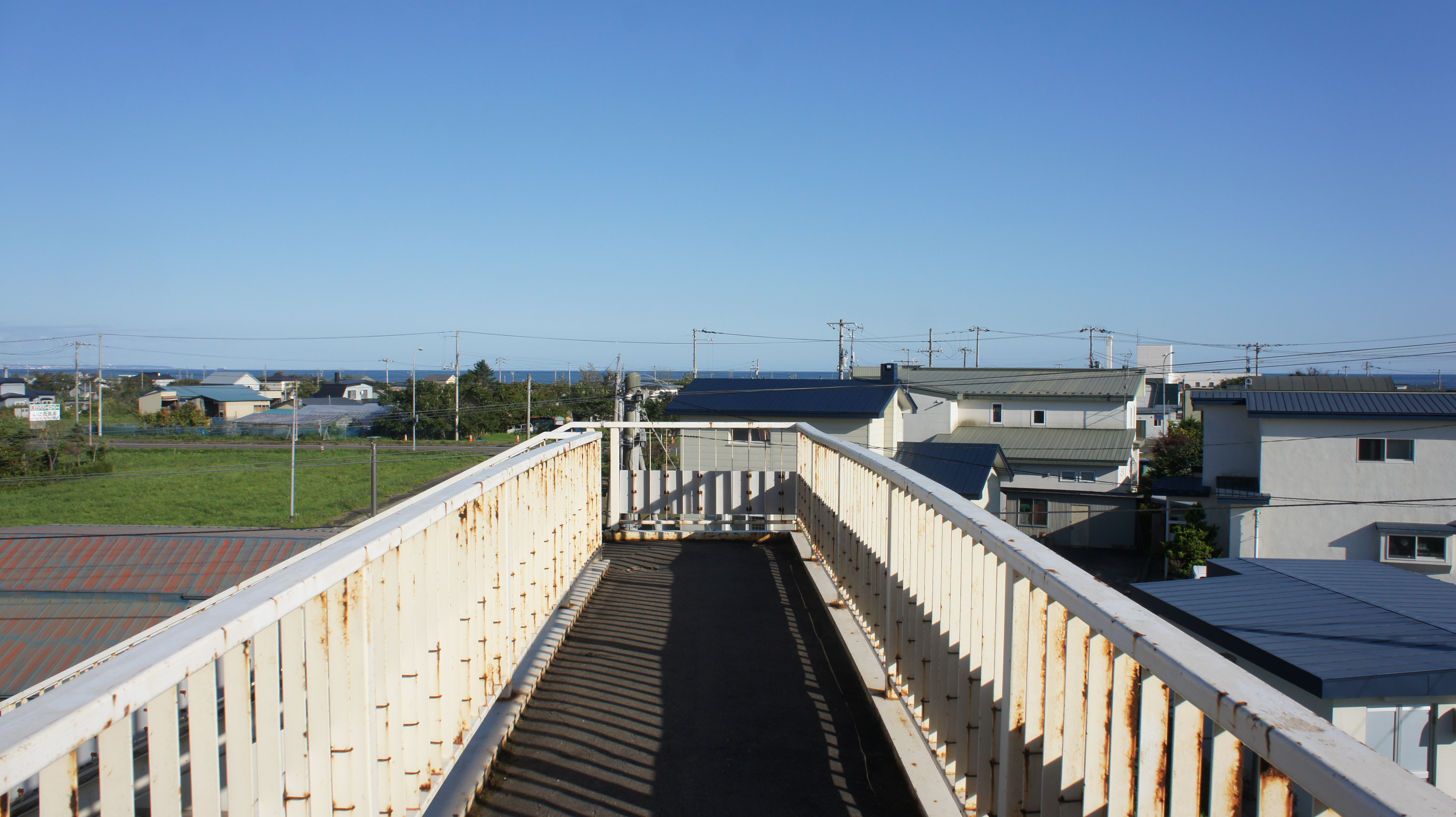
Footbridge

== History ==
The station opened on 28 March 1941 as a signal stop on the Japanese Government Railways. The Meiji Mining Shoro Private Line operated freight cars from this station to Shoro Station from 1941 to 1964. Nishi Shoro was updated to a temporary station on 1 April 1951 and began passenger operations. It was promoted to a full station on 5 March 1952. Following the privatization of the Japanese National Railways on 1 April 1987, the station came under the control of JR Hokkaido.

== Passenger statistics ==
In fiscal 2014, the station was used by an average of 40 passengers daily.

== Surrounding area ==
- Hokkaido Route 242 Kamishoji-Shoji Station Line
- Japan National Route 38

== See also ==
- List of railway stations in Japan
