= Satsunai Station =

Railway station in Makubetsu, Hokkaido, Japan

K32 Satsunai Station 札内駅
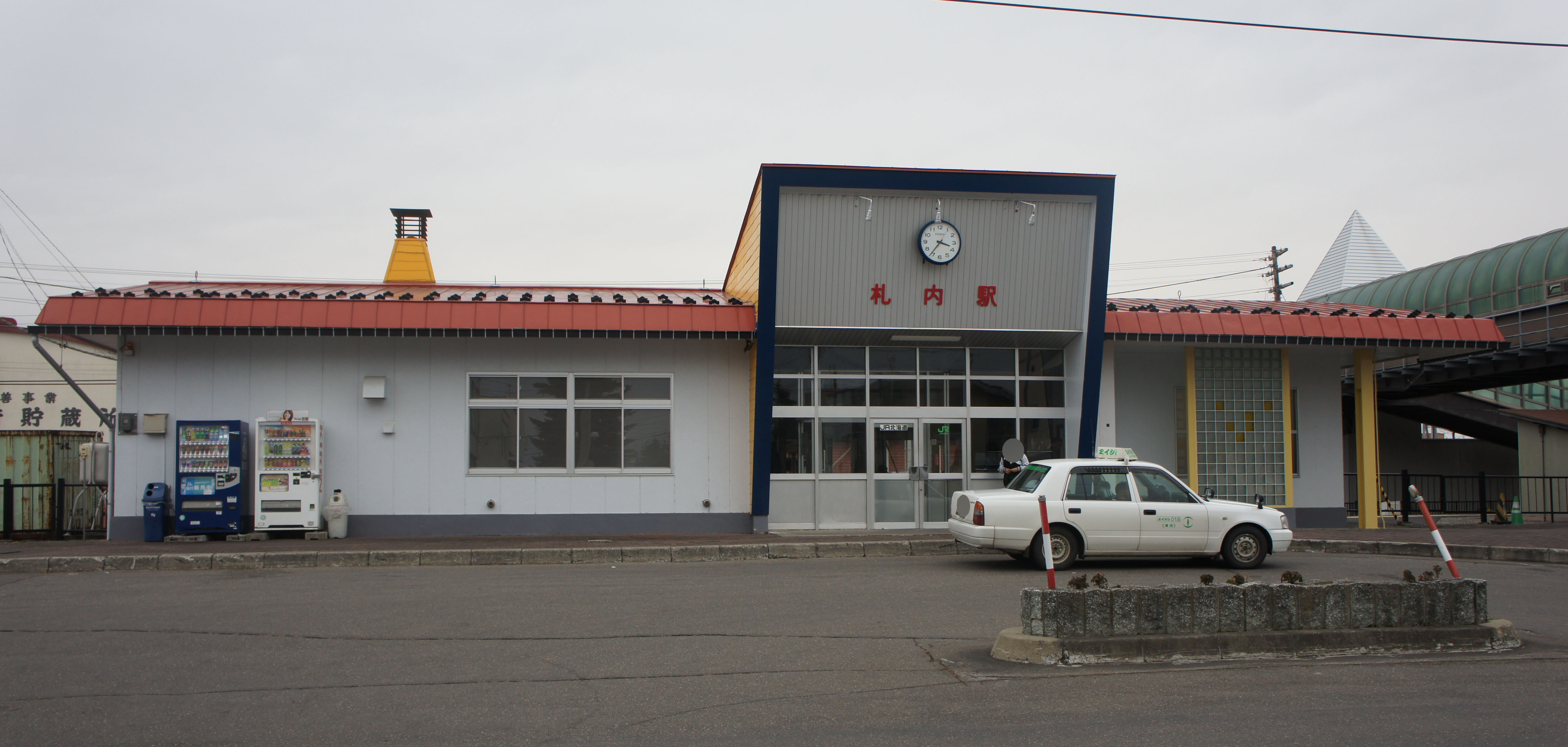
- Station building in October 2017

General information
- Location: Satsunaichuomachi, Makubetsu, Nakagawa District, Hokkaido 089-0543; Japan
- Coordinates: 42°54′45.71″N 143°15′22.49″E
- System: regional rail
- Operator: JR Hokkaido
- Line: Nemuro Main Line
- Distance: 48.6 km from Shintoku
- Platforms: 2 side platforms
- Tracks: 2

Construction
- Structure type: At-grade
- Accessible: No

Other information
- Status: Unstaffed
- Station code: K32
- Website: Official website

History
- Opened: 7 January 1910; 116 years ago

Passengers
- FY2018: 626 daily

Services
Preceding station	JR Hokkaido	Following station
Obihiro towards Takikawa	Nemuro Main Line Local	Makubetsu towards Nemuro
Location
- Location within Hokkaido Location within Japan

Satsunai Station (札内駅, Satsunai-eki) is a railway station located in the town of Makubetsu, Nakagawa District, Hokkaidō, It is operated by JR Hokkaido.

== Lines ==
The station is served by the Nemuro Main Line, and lies 48.6 km from the starting point of the line at Shintoku.

== Layout ==
Satsunai Station has two side platforms two side platforms and two tracks, connected by a level crossing in the center of the platforms. Both tracks are open to trains in both directions, but the main line is track 2, opposite the station building. Express and freight trains pass through track 2 in both directions, while local trains generally stop on track 1 in both directions. The station building is located on the north side of the station. It is unattended.

There used to be a freight platform on the east side of the station, but it was abolished in September 1982. There were also dedicated tracks to the Daikyo Oil oil tank facility and Iwatani Corporation's LPG center, both of which were located east of the station, but these were all abolished by April 1992.

=== Platforms ===
1	■ Nemuro Main Line	for Obihiro and Shintoku for Kushiro
2	■ Nemuro Main Line	<siding>

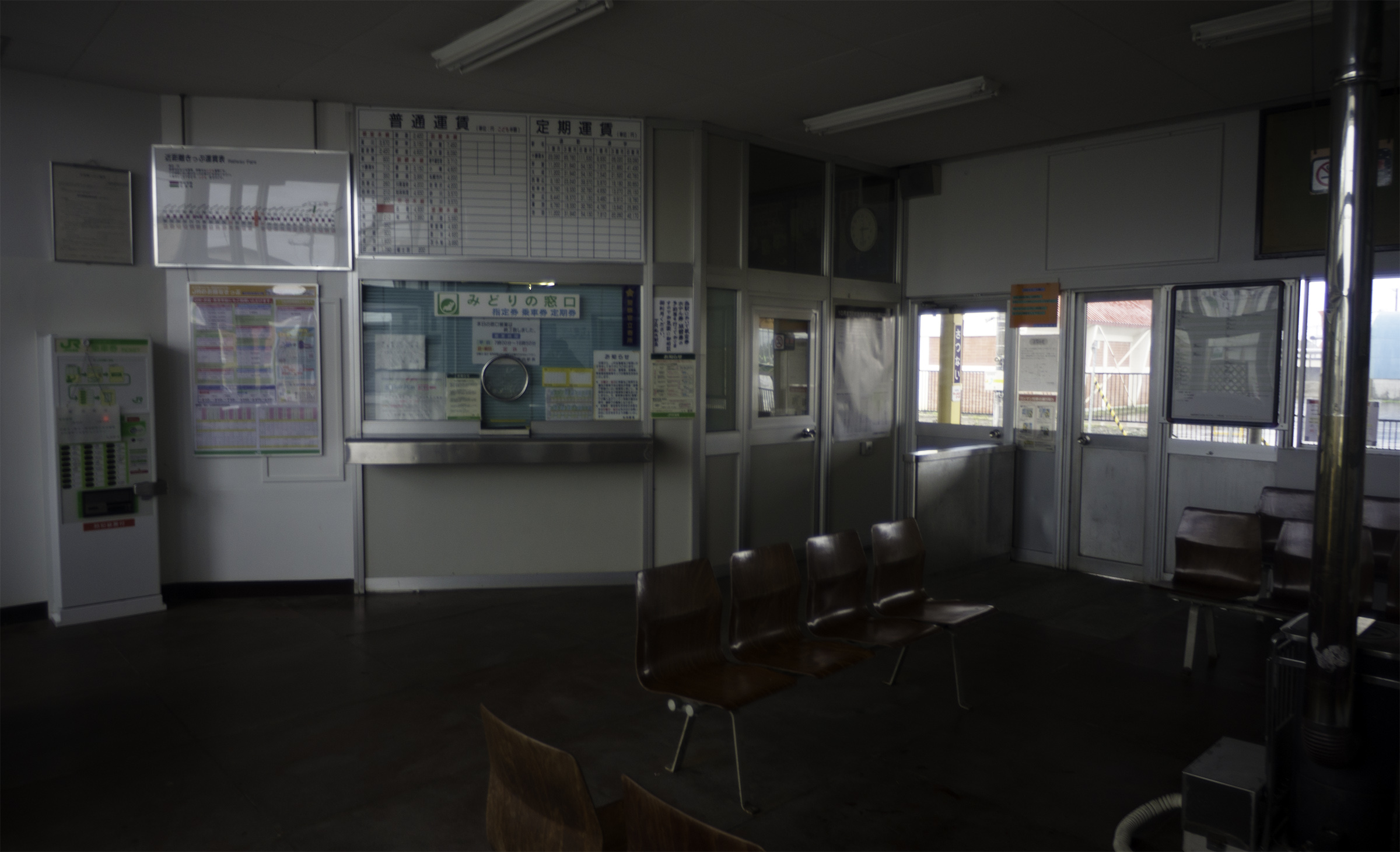
Waiting room

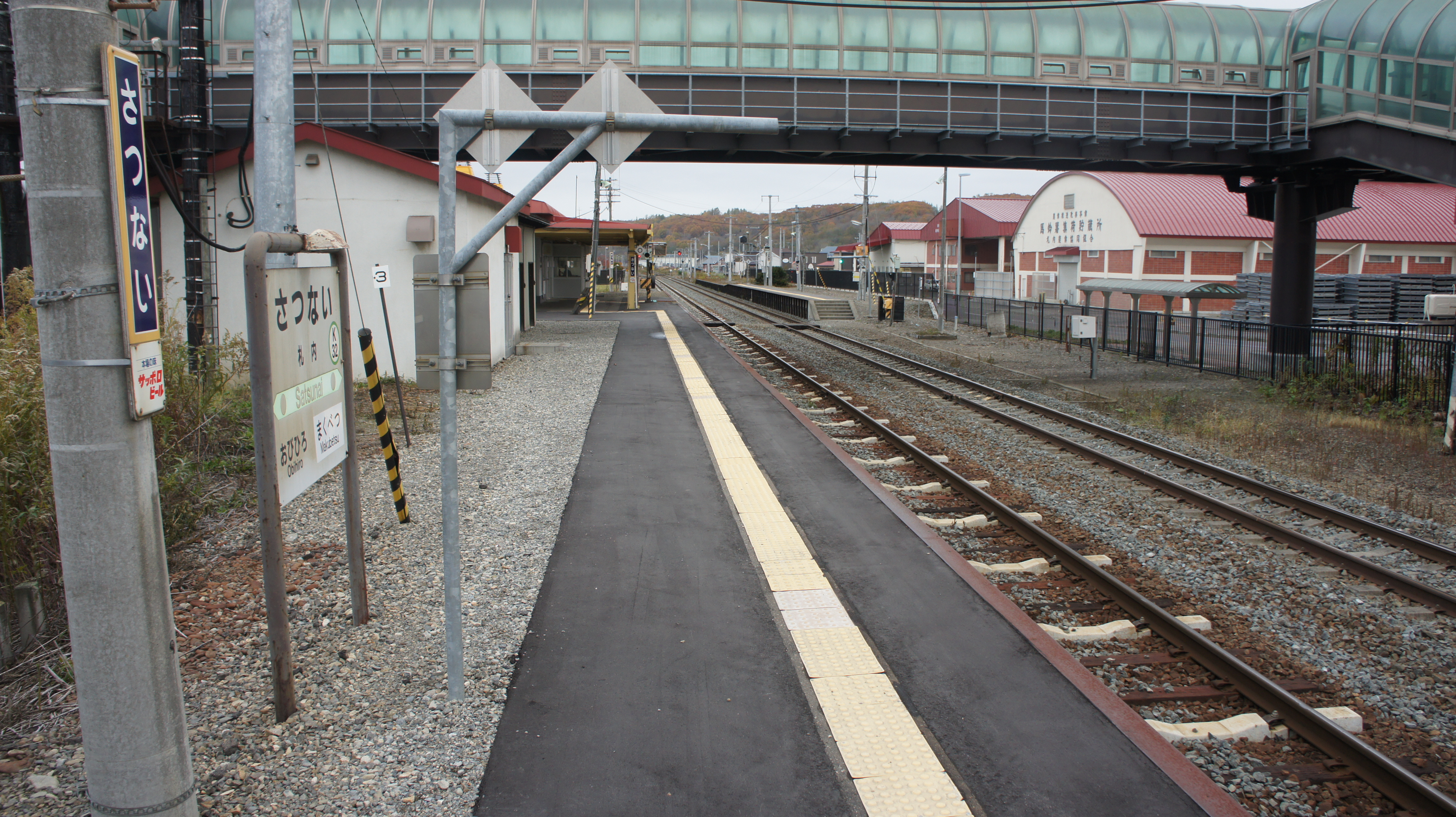
Platforms

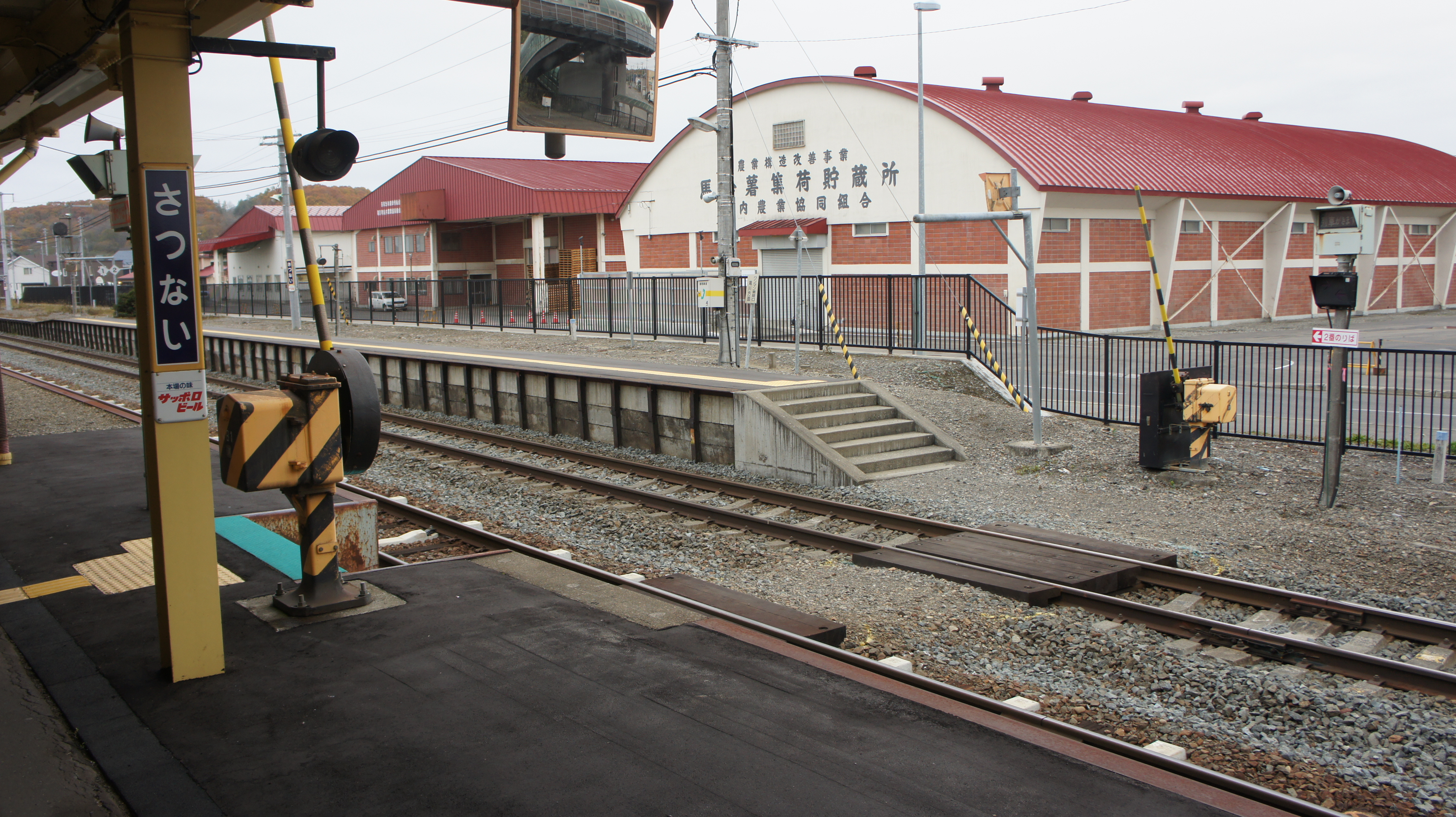
Level crossing

== History ==
Satsunai Station opened on 7 January 1910 on the Japanese Government Railways. With the privatization of the Japan National Railway (JNR) on 1 April 1987, the station came under the aegis of the Hokkaido Railway Company (JR Hokkaido).

== Passenger statistics ==
In fiscal 2018, the station was used by under 626 passengers daily.

== Surrounding area ==
- Japan National Route 38
- Japan National Route 242
- Hokkaido Highway Route 441 Satsunai Station Line
- Hokkaido Highway Route 151 Makubetsu-Obihiro-Memuro Line
- Makubetsu Town Hall Satsunai Branch

== See also ==
- List of railway stations in Japan
