= Toshibetsu Station =

Railway station in Ikeda, Hokkaido, Japan

K35 Toshibetsu Station 利別駅
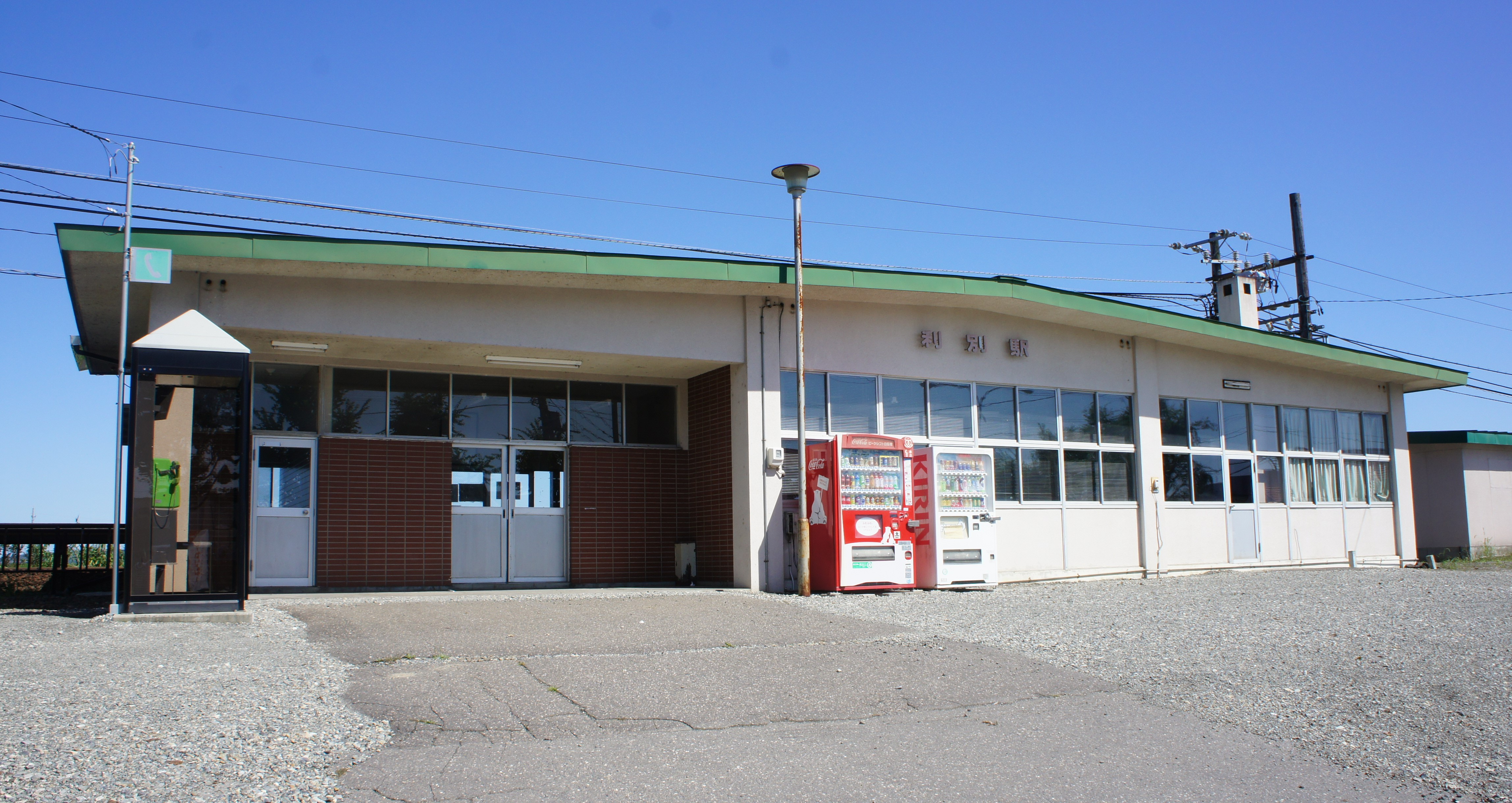
- Station building in September 2018

General information
- Location: Toshibetsu Nishimachi, Ikeda, Nakagawa District, Hokkaido 083-0031; Japan
- Coordinates: 42°56′4.84″N 143°25′27.73″E
- System: regional rail
- Operator: JR Hokkaido
- Line: Nemuro Main Line
- Distance: 64.5 km from Shintoku
- Platforms: 1 island platform
- Tracks: 2

Construction
- Structure type: At-grade
- Accessible: No

Other information
- Status: Unstaffed
- Station code: K35
- Website: Official website

History
- Opened: 15 December 1904; 121 years ago

Passengers
- FY2014: >58 daily

Services
Preceding station	JR Hokkaido	Following station
Makubetsu towards Takikawa	Nemuro Main Line Local	Ikeda towards Nemuro
Location
- Location within Hokkaido Location within Japan

Toshibetsu Station (利別駅, Toshibetsu-eki) is a railway station located in the town of Ikeda, Nakagawa District, Hokkaidō, It is operated by JR Hokkaido.

== Lines ==
The station is served by the Nemuro Main Line, and lies 64.5 km from the starting point of the line at Shintoku.

== Layout ==
Toshibetsu Station has one island platform and two tracks. Platform 2 can also be used by inbound trains, but is usually only used by outbound trains. A level crossing is located on the Takikawa side, allowing passengers to exit the station directly without passing through the station building. The station building was newly constructed in 1967when the station was relocated, and is a single-story reinforced concrete structure. The station building is unattended.

=== Platforms ===
1	■ Nemuro Main Line	for Obihiro and Shintoku
2	■ Nemuro Main Line	for Kushiro

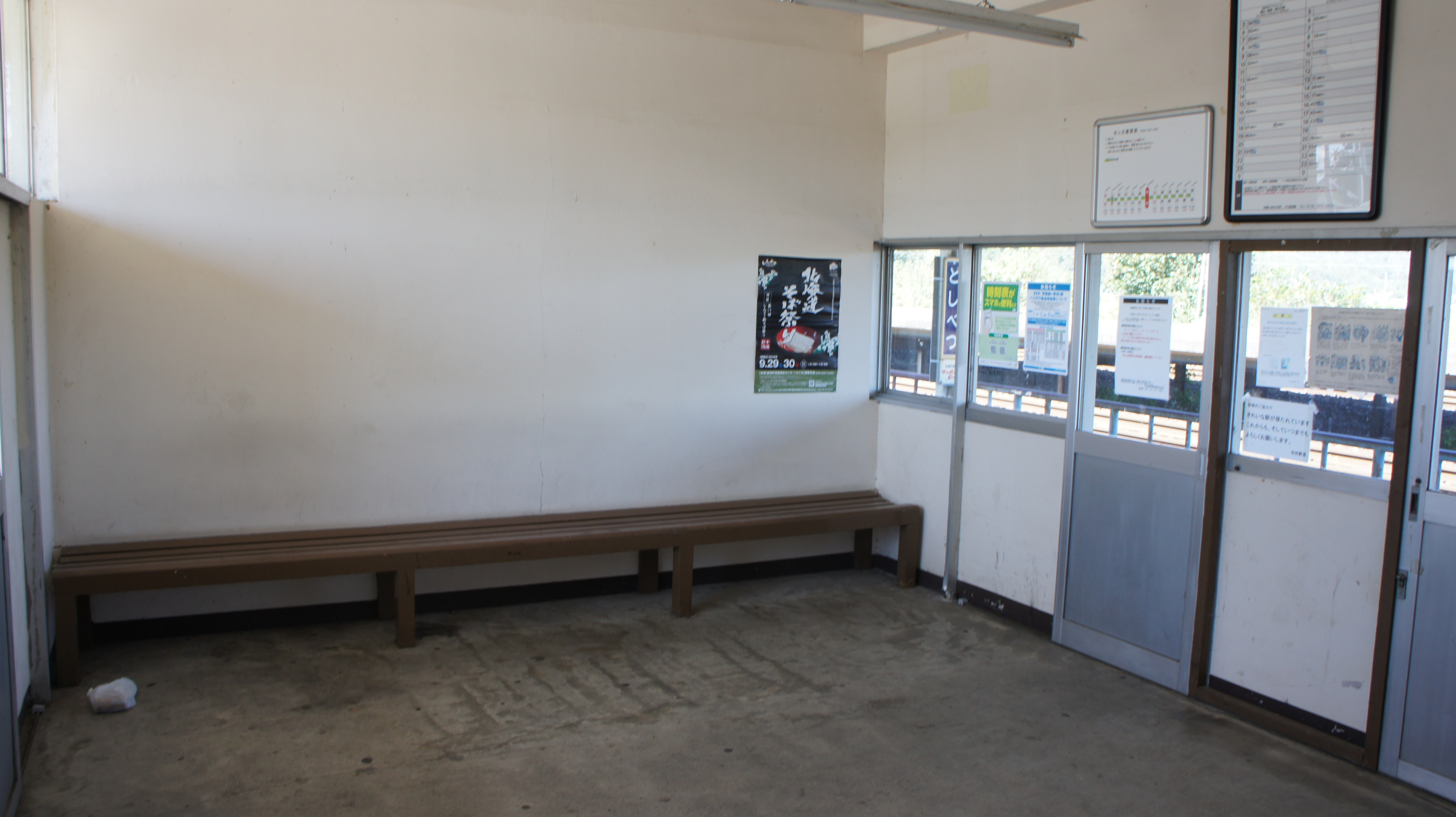
Waiting room

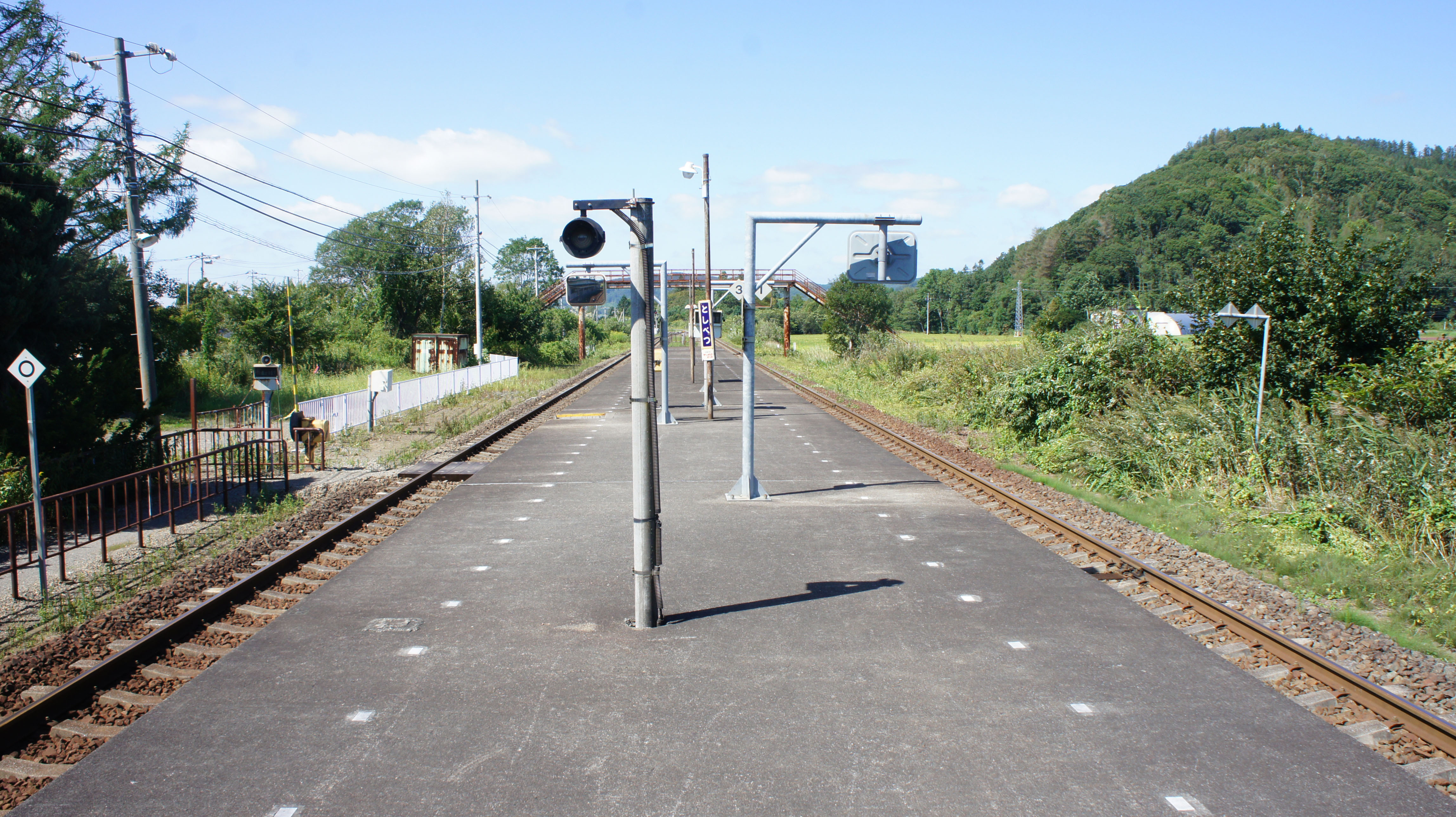
Platforms

== History ==
The station opened on 15 December 1904 as a station on the Hokkaido Government Railway, which was annexed to the Japanese Government Railways on 1 April1905. On 1 November 1967 the station was relocated approximately 630 meters toward Takigawa from its original location.With the privatization of the Japan National Railway (JNR) on 1 April 1987, the station came under the aegis of the Hokkaido Railway Company (JR Hokkaido).

== Passenger statistics ==
In fiscal 2014, the station was used by under 58 passengers daily.。

== Surrounding area ==
The urban area of Tobetsu lies to the south, with many residential areas. The north side is primarily farmland.

- Japan National Route 242

== See also ==
- List of railway stations in Japan
