= Makubetsu Station =

Railway station in Makubetsu, Hokkaido, Japan

K34 Makubetsu Station 幕別駅
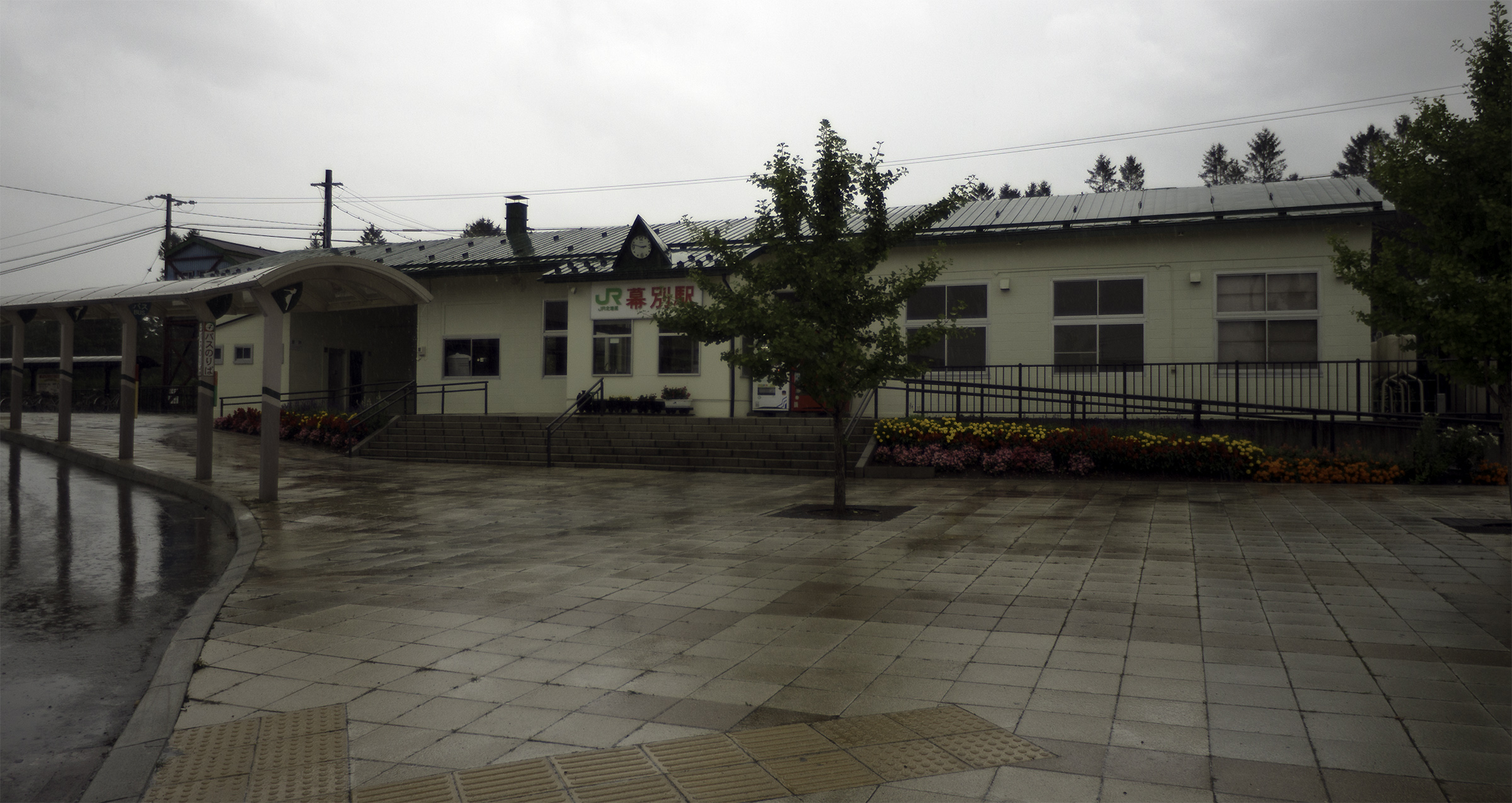
- Station building in September 2013

General information
- Location: Nishikimachi, Makubetsu, Nakagawa District, Hokkaido 089-0604; Japan
- Coordinates: 42°54′28.24″N 143°21′33.11″E
- System: regional rail
- Operator: JR Hokkaido
- Line: Nemuro Main Line
- Distance: 58.0km from Shintoku
- Platforms: 1 side + 1 island platform
- Tracks: 3

Construction
- Structure type: At-grade
- Accessible: No

Other information
- Status: Staffed (Midori no Madoguchi)
- Station code: K34
- Website: Official website

History
- Opened: 11 October 1905; 121 years ago
- Former names: Yamuwakka (until 1963)

Passengers
- FY2018: 386 daily

Services
Preceding station	JR Hokkaido	Following station
Satsunai towards Takikawa	Nemuro Main Line Local	Toshibetsu towards Nemuro
Location
- Location within Hokkaido Location within Japan

Makubetsu Station (幕別駅, Makubetsu-eki) is a railway station located in the town of Makubetsu, Nakagawa District, Hokkaidō, It is operated by JR Hokkaido.

== Lines ==
The station is served by the Nemuro Main Line, and lies 58.0 km from the starting point of the line at Shintoku.

== Layout ==
Makubetsu station has one side platform and one island platform connected by a footbridge. Platform 1, the main track adjacent to the station building, is generally used for both inbound and outbound trains, with Platform 2 (or 3) used for inbound trains and Platform 3 for outbound trains only when passing or waiting for overtaking. The station has a Midori no Madoguchi staffed ticket office.

=== Platforms ===
1-3	■ Nemuro Main Line	for Obihiro and Shintoku for Kushiro

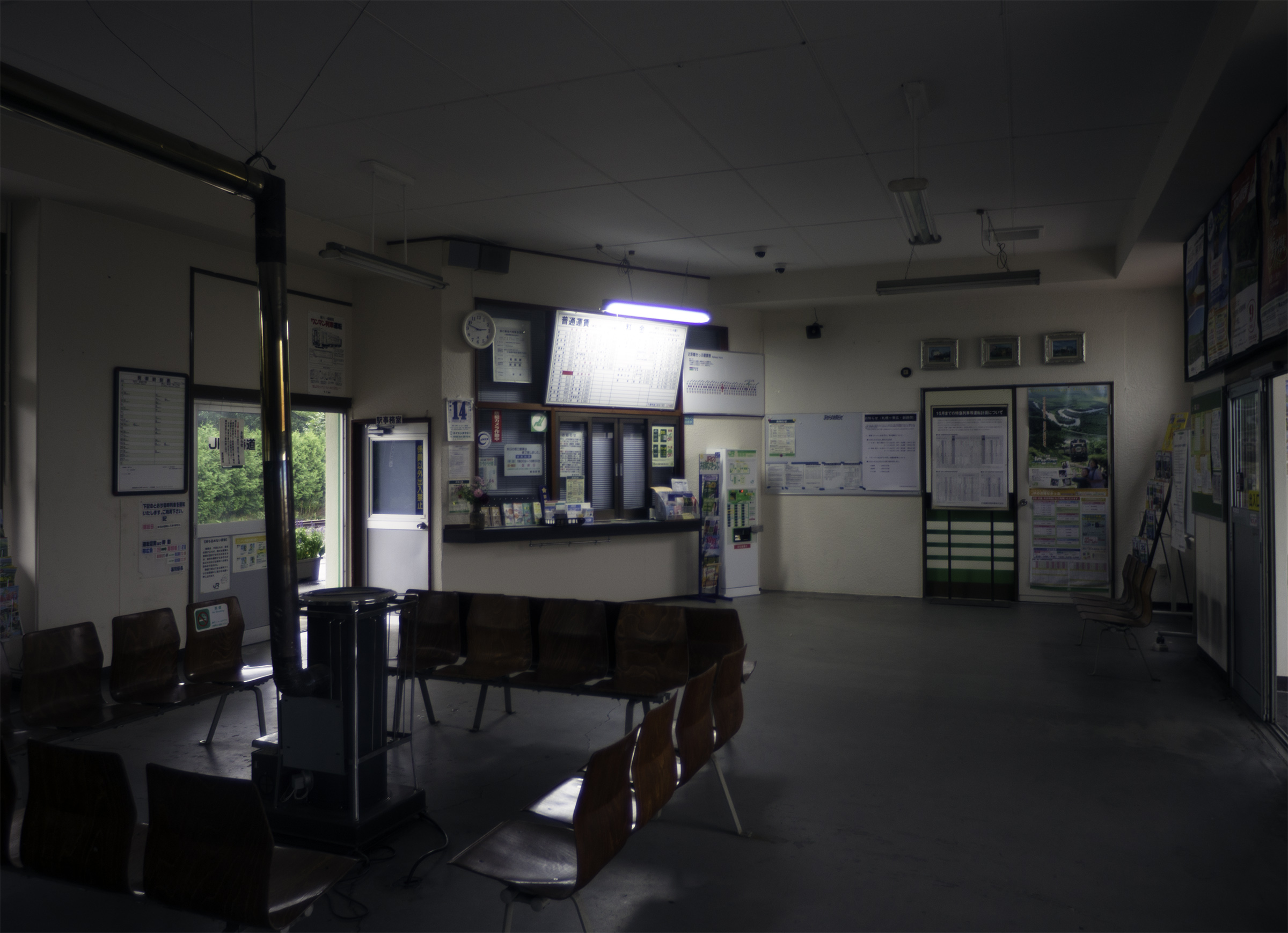
Waiting room

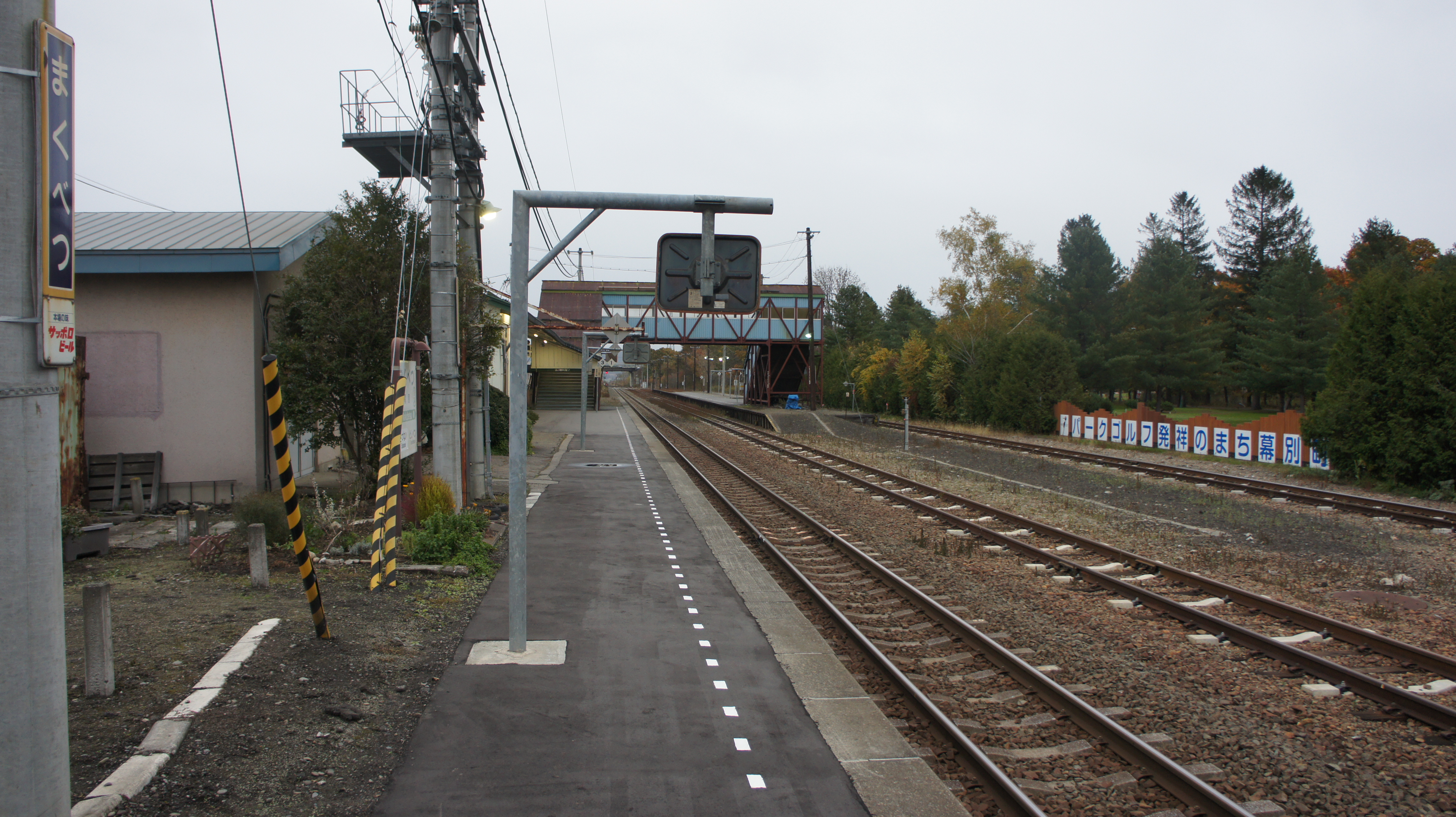
Platforms

== History ==
Makubetsu Station opened on 21 October 1905 as Yamuwakka Station (止若駅) on the Japanese Government Railways. It was renamed to its current name, Makubetsu Station, in 1963. With the privatization of the Japan National Railway (JNR) on 1 April 1987, the station came under the aegis of the Hokkaido Railway Company (JR Hokkaido).

== Passenger statistics ==
In fiscal 2018, the station was used by under 386 passengers daily.

== Surrounding area ==
- Japan National Route 38
- Japan National Route 242
- Makubetsu Town Hall
- Makubetsu Community Hall
- Makubetsu Town Library
- Hokkaido Makubetsu High School

== See also ==
- List of railway stations in Japan
