= Nemuro Peninsula Chashi Sites =

National historic site in Hokkaido, Japan

- 根室半島チャシ跡群 (Japanese)
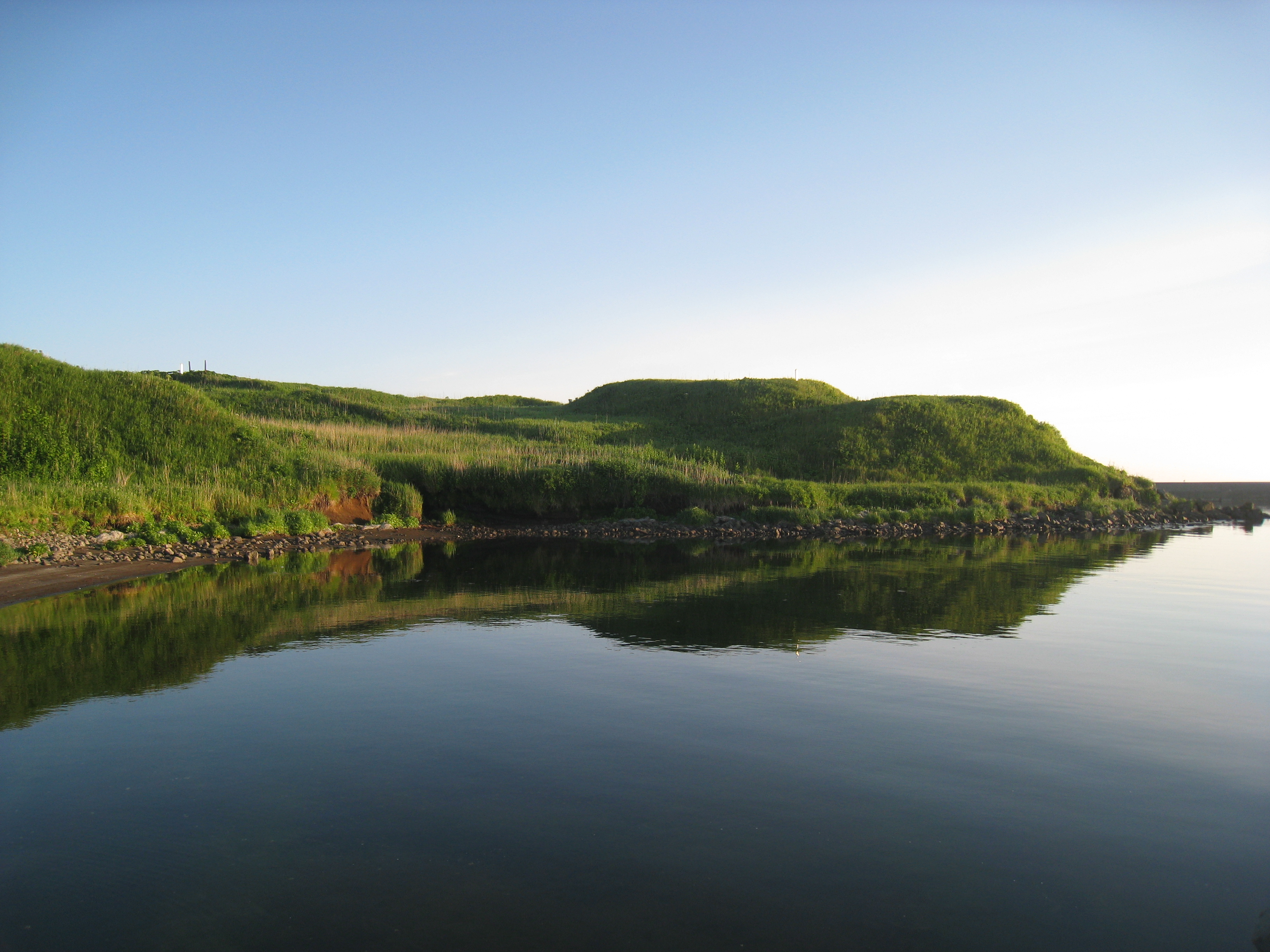
- Onnemoto Chashi

- Location within Hokkaido Location within Japan
- 43°23′19″N 145°46′57″E
- Type: Chashi
- Location: Nemuro, Hokkaidō, Japan

Nemuro Peninsula Chashi Sites (根室半島チャシ跡群, Nemuro hantō chashi ato-gun) is a grouping of twenty-four Ainu chashi on the Nemuro Peninsula in Nemuro, Hokkaidō, Japan that have been jointly designated a national Historic Site, out of a total of thirty-two chashi sites identified in the city. The grouping is also the first entry on the Japan Castle Foundation's 2006 list of Japan's Top 100 Castles. Typically found at elevations of 5 metres (16 ft) to 50 metres (160 ft) above sea level, they are mostly situated on bluffs overlooking the Sea of Okhotsk, reinforced with U-shaped or semicircular moats. Relative to many of those elsewhere on the island, their state of preservation is good. They are thought to date from the sixteenth to the eighteenth centuries, and are associated with the 1789 Menashi–Kunashir rebellion.

The twenty-four comprise:

- Afuramoi Chashi (アフラモイチャシ跡)
- Atsukeshieto No.1 Chashi (アツケシエト1号チャシ跡)
- Atsukeshieto No.2 Chashi (アツケシエト2号チャシ跡)
- Charukorofina No.1 Chashi (チャルコロフィナ1号チャシ跡)
- Charukorofina No.2 Chashi (チャルコロフィナ2号チャシ跡)
- Hirikaota Chashi (ヒリカヲタチャシ跡)
- Konbuushimui Chashi (コンブウシムイチャシ跡)
- Kotankeshi No.1 Chashi (コタンケシ1号チャシ跡)
- Kotankeshi No.2 Chashi (コタンケシ2号チャシ跡)
- Ninoushi Chashi (ニノウシチャシ跡)
- Nirankeushi No.1 Chashi (ニランケウシ1号チャシ跡)
- Nirankeushi No.2 Chashi (ニランケウシ2号チャシ跡)
- Nirankeushi No.3 Chashi (ニランケウシ3号チャシ跡)
- Notsukamafu No.1 Chashi (ノツカマフ1号チャシ跡)
- Notsukamafu No.2 Chashi (ノツカマフ2号チャシ跡)
- Ōnai No.1 Chashi (ヲーナイ1号チャシ跡)
- Ōnai No.2 Chashi (ヲーナイ2号チャシ跡)
- Onnemoto Chashi (ヲンネモトチャシ跡)
- Ponmoi Chashi (ポンモイチャシ跡)
- Satsukotan Chashi (サツコタンチャシ跡)
- Shienahaushi Chashi (シエナハウシチャシ跡)
- Toushamu No.1 Chashi (トウシャム１号チャシ跡)
- Toushamu No.2 Chashi (トウシャム2号チャシ跡)
- Uennai Chashi (ウェンナイチャシ跡)

== See also ==
- List of Historic Sites of Japan (Hokkaidō)
- List of Cultural Properties of Japan - archaeological materials (Hokkaidō)
- Katsuragaoka Chashi
- Yukuepira Chashi
- Moshiriya Chashi
