= Otafunbe Chashi =

Historic site in Urahoro, Hokkaidō, Japan

- オタフンベチャシ跡 (Japanese)
- Location within Hokkaido Location within Japan
- Interactive map of Otafunbe Chashi
- 42°49′32″N 143°50′34″E
- Type: Chashi
- Location: Urahoro, Hokkaidō, Japan
- Region: Hokkaidō

History
- Built: 16th and 18th centuries

Site notes
- Public access: Yes (park)

The Otafunbe Chashi (オタフンベチャシ跡, Otafunbe chashi ato) is the remains of an Ainu chashi, located in the Naobetsu neighborhood of the city of Urahoro, Hokkaidō, Japan. The site was designated a National Historic Site in 1981.

== Overview ==
A Chashi (チャシ also 砦) is the Japanese term for the hilltop fortifications of the Ainu. The word is of Ainu origin, from チャシ (casi, /t͡ɕasi/), which means palisade or palisaded compound. Over 520 chashi have been identified in Hokkaidō, mostly in the eastern regions of the island; others are known from southern Sakhalin and the Kurils. Most date largely to the early seventeenth century and their construction may be related to increased competition for resources as a result of "intensification of trade" with the Japanese.

The Otafunbe Chashi is located in the Shiranuka Hills (白糠丘陵), near the border between the Tokachi and Kushiro Subprefectures, it is believed to have been constructed between the 16th and 18th centuries. Surrounded by a dry moat, the low elevation rises to some 27 metres (89 ft), and is now separated from the Pacific coast by Hokkaido Route 1038 (ja). The mound is topped by a flattish area of some 21 metres (69 ft) by 7 metres (23 ft), surrounded by a ditch. The name "Otafunbe" combines the Ainu for "sand" (ota) with that for "whale" (funbe or humbe), reflecting the shape of the mound.

The chashi features in the historical record, and legends about the place have been handed down: in days of yore, the Akkeshi Ainu attacked the Shiranuka Ainu, who held out in the chashi. Unable to prevail, in the middle of the night, the Akkeshi Ainu formed a whale from the sand, and lay low behind. At daybreak, the Shiranuka Ainu approached this offered-up whale, whereupon the Akkeshi Ainu sprung upon them. As the arrows flew, one struck the Shiranuka Ainu chief in the testicles, whence the place became known as Opushomainai (オプショマイナイ) or "the testicle-bursting stream". Attempting to flee across a small watercourse, he succumbed to his injuries, whence it became known as Nokomanai (ノコマナイ) or the "stream that dropped the testicles". As the waters flowed red, it also became known as Furebetsu (フレベツ) or "red river". When the Akkeshi Ainu subsequently boarded their boats and were rowing out, a swarm of bees such as had never before been seen flew forth from where the dead were buried, and the greater part of them were stung to death.

The chashi is about a five-minute drive from Atsunai Station on the JR Hokkaido Nemuro Main Line.

== See also ==
- List of Historic Sites of Japan (Hokkaidō)
- List of Cultural Properties of Japan - archaeological materials (Hokkaidō)
- Trojan Horse
- Yukuepira Chashi
- Aetiology
