= Abashiri City Museum of Art =

- 網走市立美術館
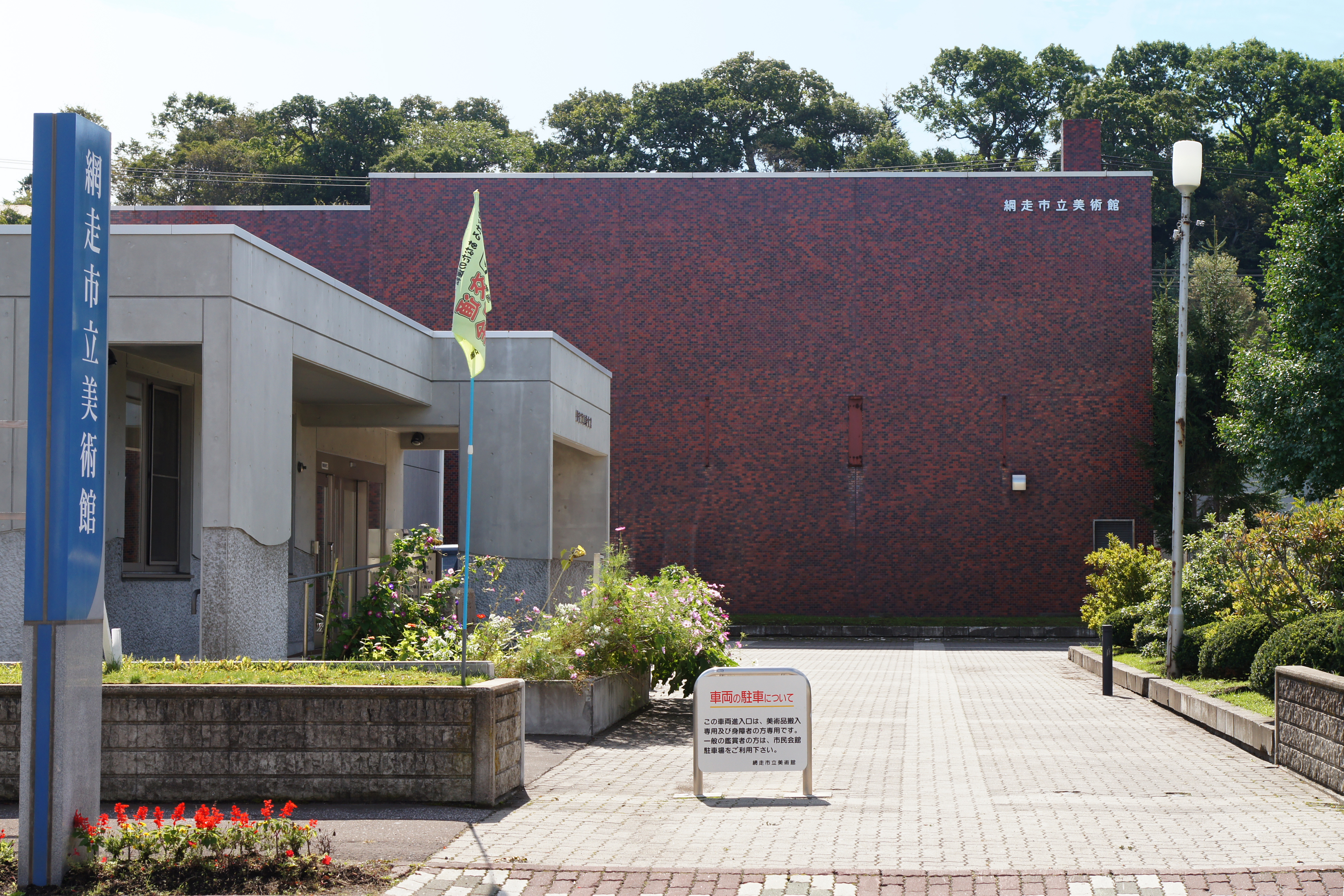

General information
- Location: 1 Minami 6 Jōnishi, Abashiri, Hokkaidō, Japan
- Coordinates: 44°01′10″N 144°16′03″E
- Opened: 1972

Website
- Official website

Abashiri City Museum of Art (網走市立美術館, Abashiri Shiritsu Bijutsukan) is a registered museum that opened in Abashiri, Hokkaidō, Japan in 1972, as the second art museum, and the first such to be purpose-built, on the island. The collection relates to artists of the Okhotsk region and temporary exhibitions are also held.

== See also ==
- Hokkaido Museum
- Abashiri City Folk Museum
- Abashiri Prison Museum
