= Moshiriya Chashi =

- モシリヤ砦跡 (Japanese)
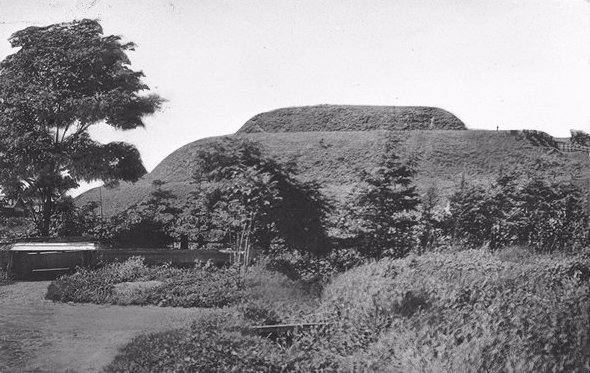

- Location within Hokkaido Location within Japan
- 42°59′01″N 144°23′45″E
- Type: Chashi
- Location: Kushiro, Hokkaidō, Japan

The site of Moshiriya Chashi (モシリヤ砦跡, Moshiriya chashi ato) in Kushiro, Hokkaidō, Japan, is once occupied by the Ainu fortified chashi of Moshiriya. Occupying an elevated site, it is said to have been constructed during the Hōreki era (1751–1764) by the Ainu chieftain Tomikara Aino (トミカラアイノ). It is one of a cluster of eleven chashi which have been jointly designated a national Historic Site:

- Kushiro
  - Moshiriya Chashi
  - Harutoru Charanke Chashi (ハルトルチャランケチャシ跡) (formerly Tsurugatai Charanke Chashi (鶴ヶ岱チャランケ砦跡))
- Kushiro (town)
  - Tenneru No.1 Chashi (テンネル第1チャシ跡)
  - Tapukopu Chashi (タプコプチャシ跡)
- Shibecha
  - Shirarutoro No.1 Chashi (シラルトロ第1チャシ跡)
  - Shirarutoro No.2 Chashi (シラルトロ第2チャシ跡)
  - Matakotan Chashi (マタコタンチャシ跡)
- Teshikaga
  - Puirakuni Chashi (プイラクニチャシ跡)
  - Kutcharoshipe No.1 Chashi (クッチャロシペ第1チャシ跡)
  - Kutcharoshipe No.2 Chashi (クッチャロシペ第2チャシ跡)
  - Urankoushi Chashi (ウランコウシチャシ跡)

They have a total designated area of 55,579.48 square metres (5.557948 ha).

== See also ==
- List of Historic Sites of Japan (Hokkaidō)
- List of Cultural Properties of Japan - archaeological materials (Hokkaidō)
- Katsuragaoka Chashi
- Yukuepira Chashi
