= Chokubetsu Station =

Former railway station in Kushiro, Hokkaido, Japan

Coordinates: 42.8522°N 143.8641°E

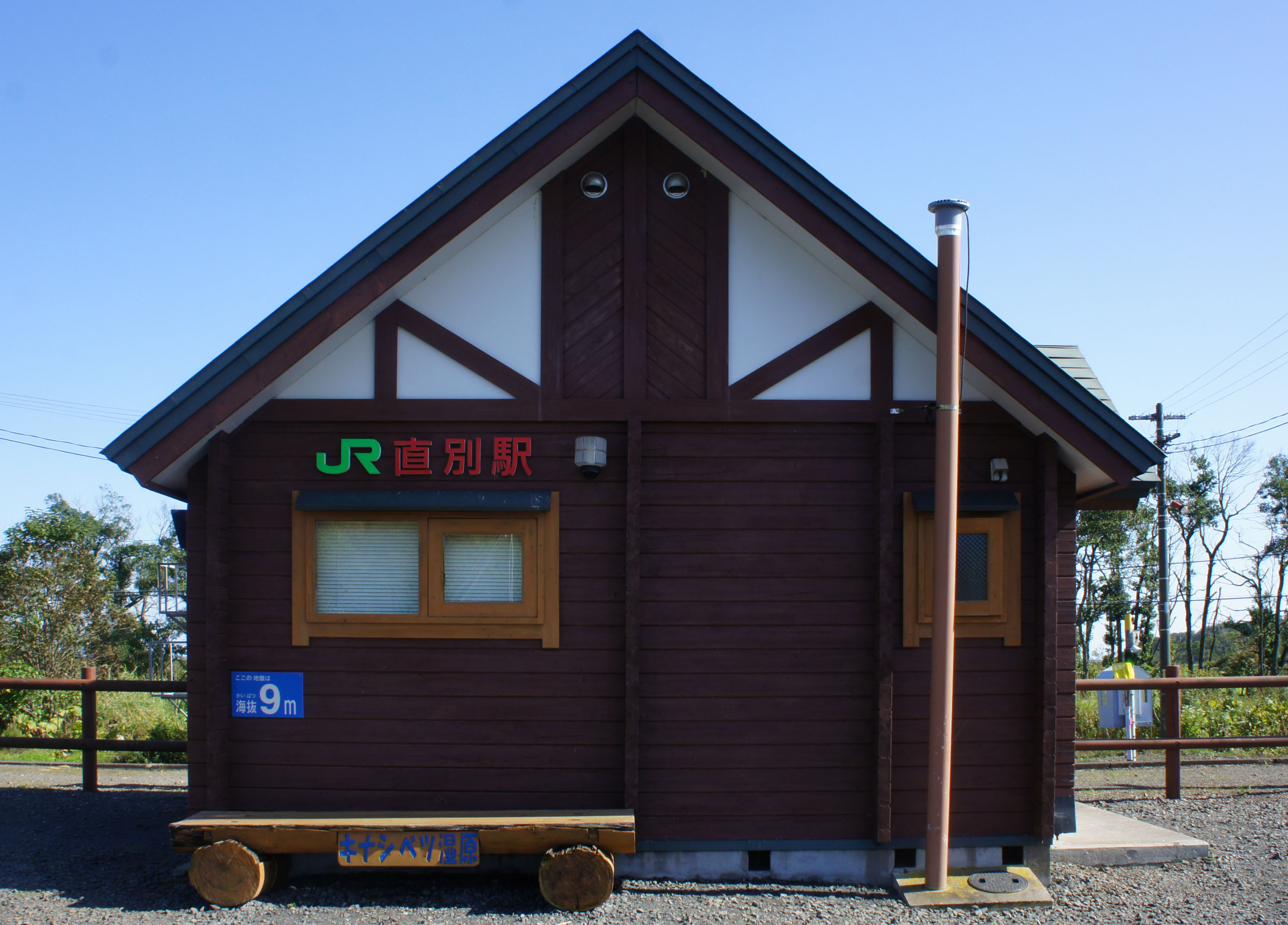
Station building, September 2018

Chokubetsu Station (直別駅, Chokubetsu-eki) was a train station in Kushiro, Hokkaidō, Japan. It was closed and became a signal point on March 16, 2019.

== Lines ==
- Hokkaido Railway Company
  - Nemuro Main Line Station K43

== Adjacent stations ==
«	Service	»
Nemuro Main Line
Limited Express Ōzora: Does not stop at this station
Atsunai	Local	Shakubetsu
