= Nosappumisaki Lighthouse =

Nosappumisaki Lighthouse Nosappu 納沙布岬灯台
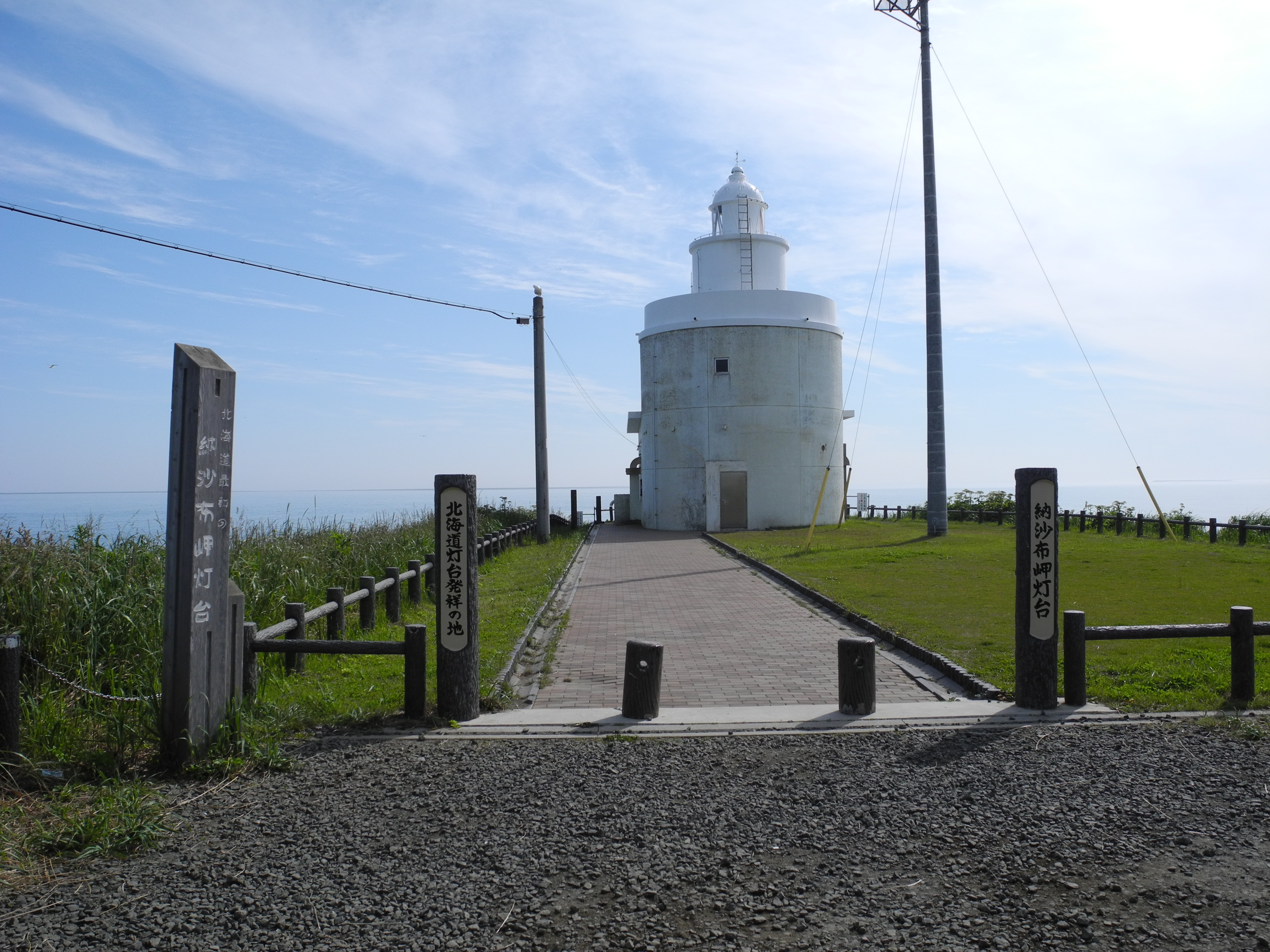
- Nosappumisaki Lighthouse
- Location: Cape Nosappu; Nemuro, Hokkaidō; Japan
- Coordinates: 43°23′06.7″N 145°48′59.3″E

Tower
- Constructed: August 15, 1872 (first)
- Construction: concrete tower
- Height: 13.5 metres (44 ft)
- Shape: broadly cylindrical tower with balcony and lantern
- Markings: white tower and lantern
- Fog signal: 3 blasts every 40 seconds

Light
- First lit: 1930 (current)
- Focal height: 23.2 metres (76 ft)
- Lens: Fourth order Fresnel
- Intensity: 15,000 cd
- Range: 14.5 nautical miles (26.9 km; 16.7 mi)
- Characteristic: Iso W R 4s.
- Japan no.: JCG-0154

Nosappumisaki Lighthouse (納沙布岬灯台, nosappumisaki tōdai) is a lighthouse on Cape Nosappu in Nemuro, Hokkaidō, Japan.

== History ==
The lighthouse was one of those designed by Richard Henry Brunton who was hired by the government of Japan to help construct lighthouses at the beginning of the Meiji period to make Japan safe for foreign ships.

== Access ==
The site is open to the public, and can be accessed by car or by public transportation. By public transportation, it is accessible by bus from Nemuro Station.

== Gallery ==
Foghorn

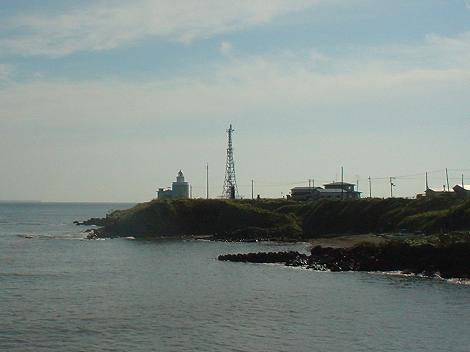
Lighthouse from afar

== See also ==
- List of lighthouses in Japan
