= Shakubetsu Station =

Former railway station in Kushiro, Hokkaido, Japan

Coordinates: 42.8691°N 143.9036°E

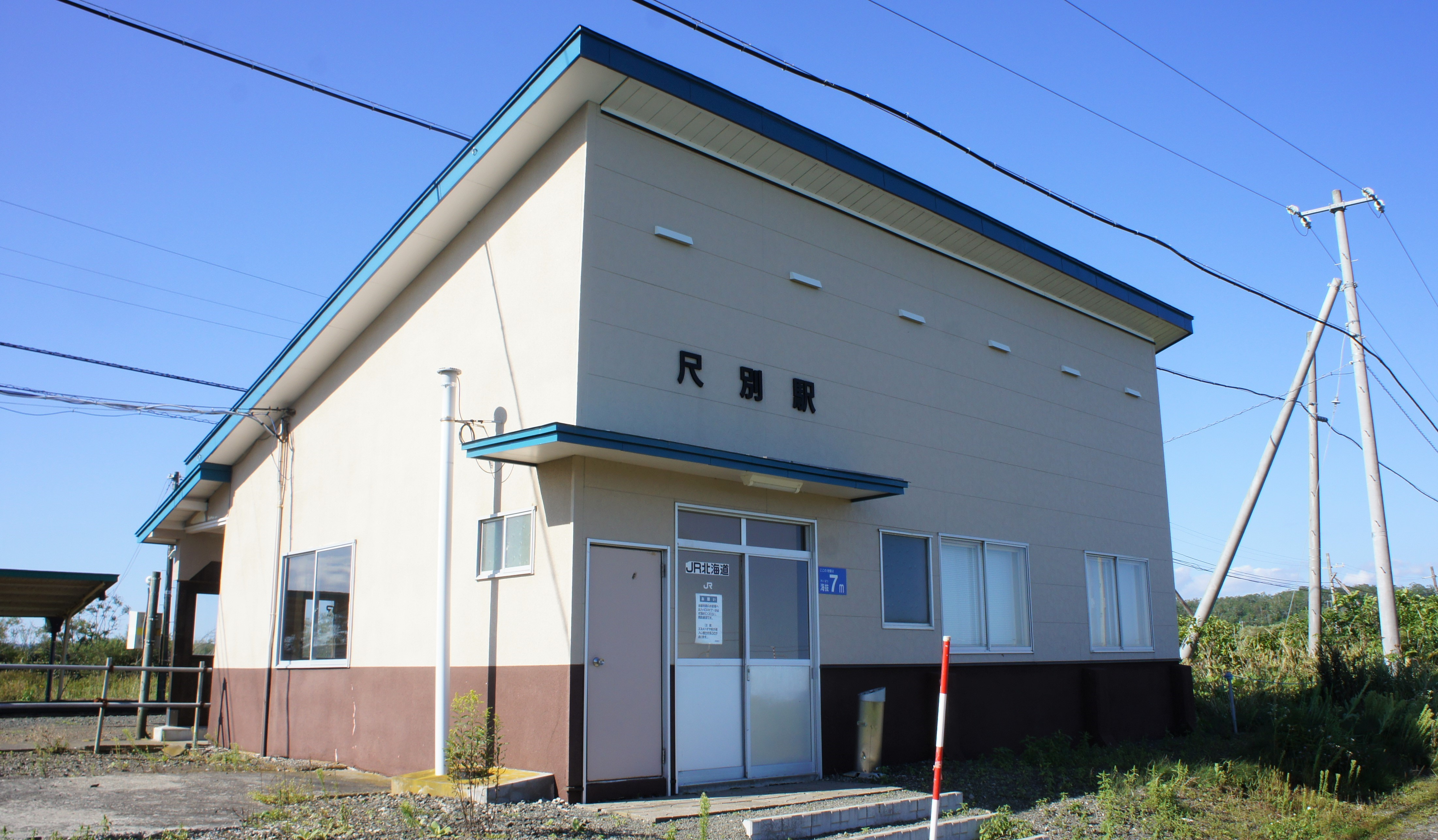
JR Nemuro Main-Line Shakubetsu Station

Shakubetsu Station (尺別駅, Shakubetsu-eki) was a train station in Kushiro, Hokkaidō, Japan. It was closed and became a signal point on March 16, 2019.

== Lines ==
- Hokkaido Railway Company
  - Nemuro Main Line Station K44

== Adjacent stations ==
«	Service	»
Nemuro Main Line
Limited Express Ōzora: Does not stop at this station
Chokubetsu	Local	Onbetsu
