= Chashi =

Ainu hilltop fortification

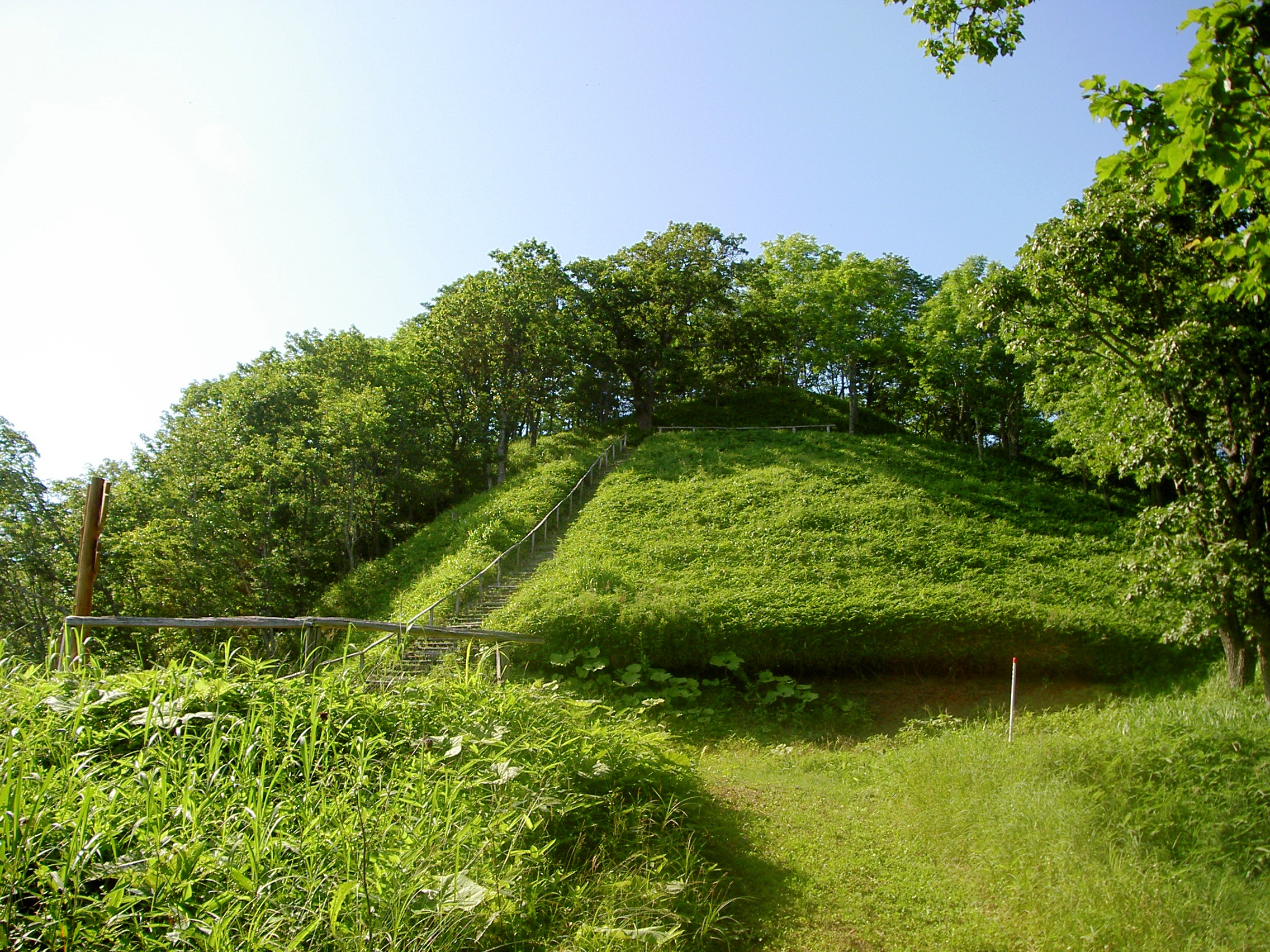
Chashi in the Kushiro wetlands

Chashi (チャシ also 砦) is the Japanese term for the hilltop fortifications of the Ainu. The word is of Ainu origin, from チャシ (casi, /t͡ɕasi/), which means palisade or palisaded compound; a rival theory relates this to the Korean term 잣 (cas, jat, /t͡ɕa̠t̚/) of roughly the same meaning. Over 520 chashi have been identified in Hokkaidō, mostly in the eastern regions of the island; others are known from southern Sakhalin and the Kurils; similar phenomena such as the ostrogu of Kamchatka and the gorodische of northeast Asia may have developed independently. A few, including the Tōya casi of present-day Kushiro, date to the Muromachi period; the remainder date largely to the early seventeenth century. As such their construction may be related to increased competition for resources as a result of "intensification of trade" with the Japanese.

== Form ==
The early Dutch explorer Maarten Gerritsz Vries described the chashi he encountered in eastern Hokkaidō in 1643:

These forts were made as follows: on the mountain on which they were placed was a small road steep to climb, and round on the four sides palisades were placed of the height … of 1½ man's length; within this stood two or three houses. There were large fir doors in the palisades with strong clamps; when they were closed, two stout bars were passed through the clamps and thus fastened to them. At the two corners of these … palisades, a high scaffolding is made of fir planks, for a lookout.

== Competition for resources ==
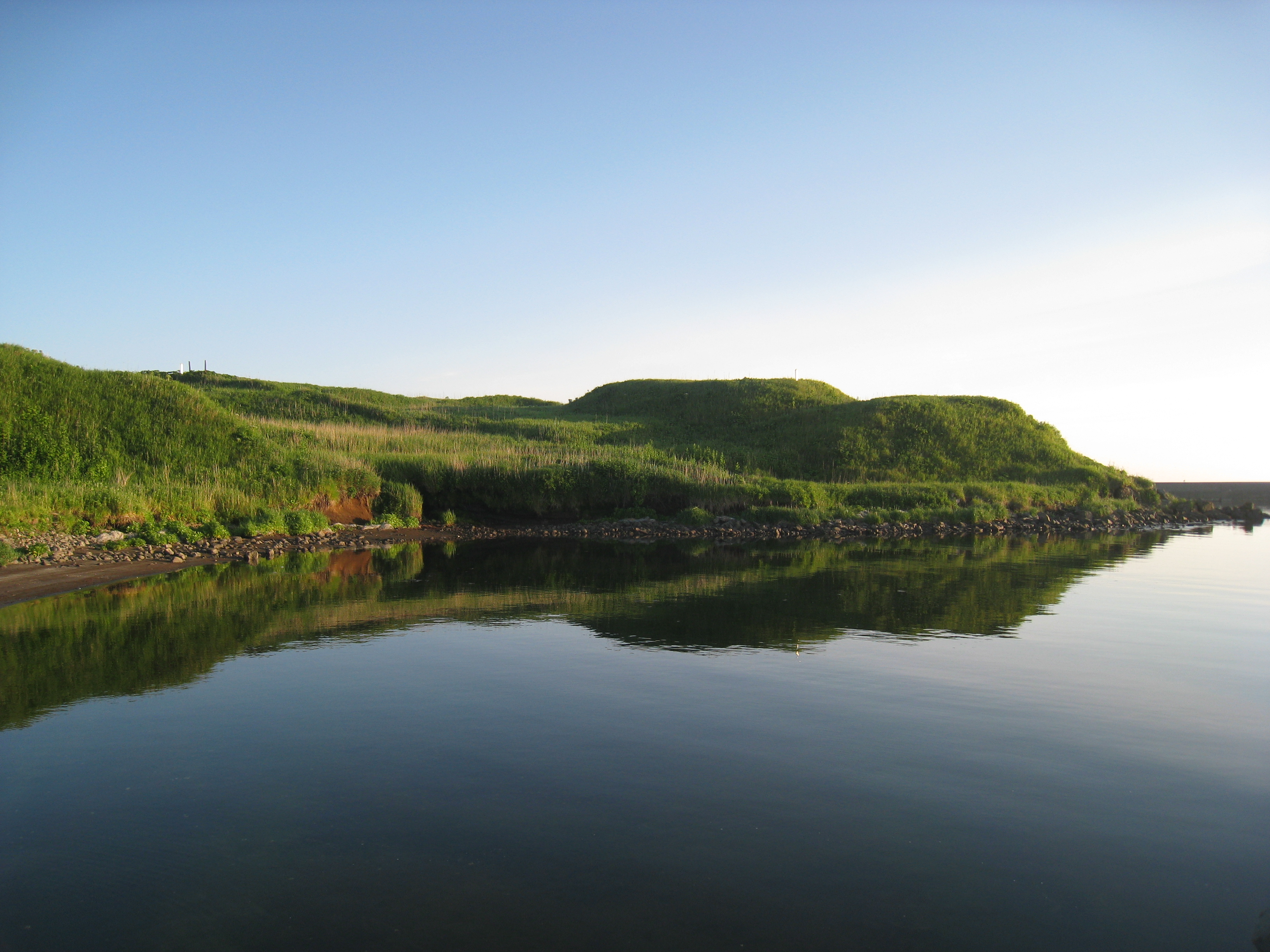
Chashi on the Nemuro Peninsula (Historic Site)

In 1604 Tokugawa Ieyasu granted exclusive trading rights with the Ainu to the Matsumae clan; lacking an agricultural base, the domain was dependent on trade; the Ainu in turn became increasingly dependent upon Japanese commodities and prestige goods. Excavated chashi have revealed Japanese lacquerware, ceramics, ironware, and swords, as well as beads perhaps from Sakhalin; consumables included rice, sake, and tobacco. In return the Ainu traded products derived from bird, beast, and fish; plants and medicines; and goods imported via Sakhalin. However, "the market culture of the trading post … destroy[ed] the ecological balance … [through] overhunting and overfishing". By the end of the following century, the depletion of natural stocks resulted in famine. Furthermore, "competition over animals and fisheries was at the heart of most Ainu conflicts".

== Shakushain's Revolt ==
The Ezo hōki (蝦夷蜂起, Ezo Uprising) and Tsugaru ittōshi (津軽一統志, Tsugaru Unification Record) recount the internecine conflict of 1668/9, which culminated in massacres of the Japanese, military intervention, and subjugation, in what is known as Shakushain's Revolt. According to the Ezo hōki, regional influence among the Ainu was based on "good land", "many utensils", charismatic authority, and physical strength. In 1668, disputes over deer, bear cubs, and a live crane lead to the Hae elder Chikunashi and his mother burning down the Shibuchari casi and killing the escapees. In response Shakushain sent the Urakawa Ainu to attack the Atsubetsu casi; driven off by musket fire they returned in force and captured it, after many of its defenders had left in search of food. The conflict escalated the following year into fighting with the Japanese. Peace talks were arranged, but the Japanese poisoned Shakshain's drink during the talks, killing him. The Shibuchari casi again burned to the ground.

== Known chashi ==
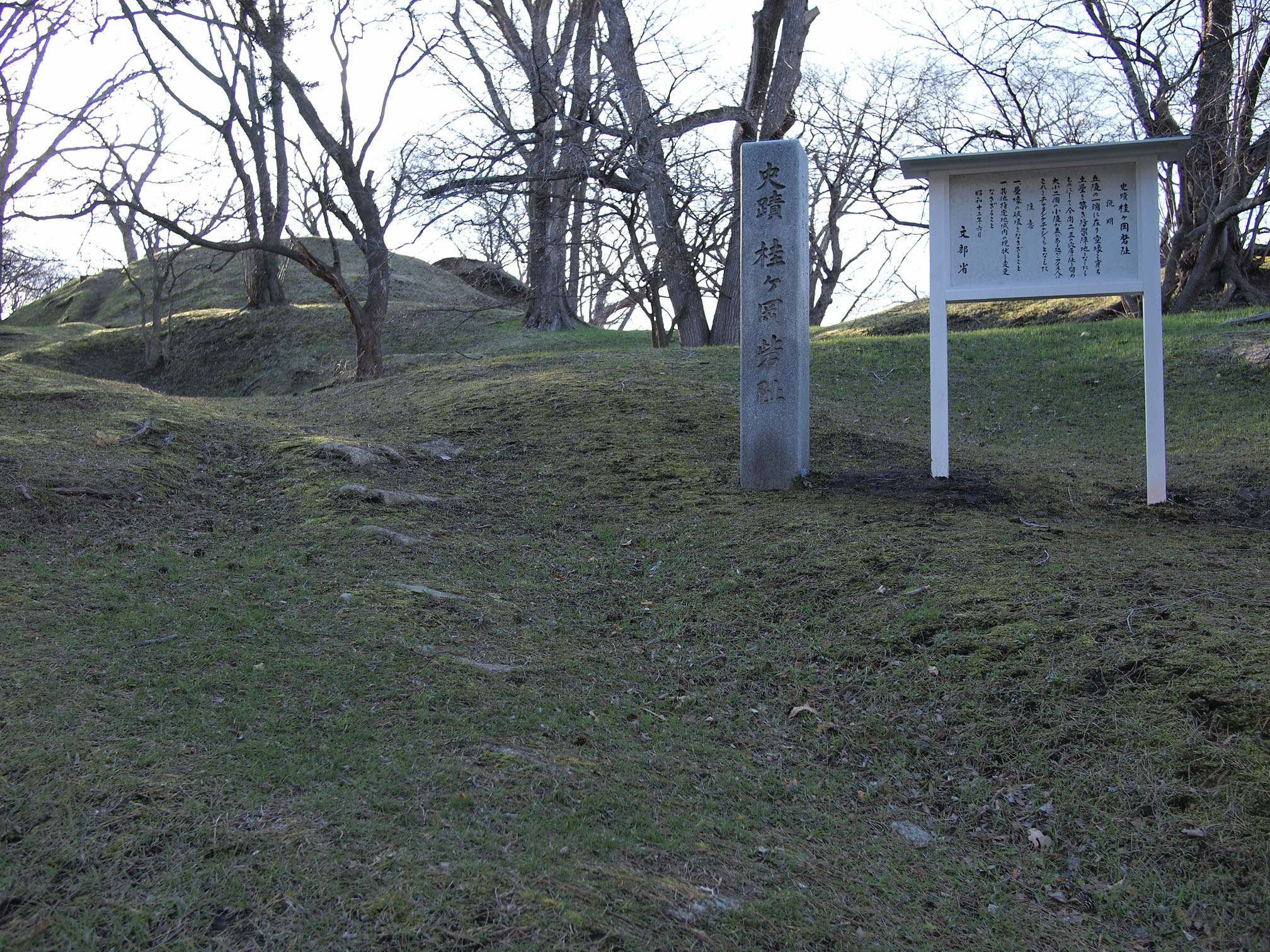
Katsuragaoka chashi (Historic Site)

Among the approximately five hundred and thirty chashi identified by archaeologists, the sites of eight have been designated national Historic Sites: the Otafunbe chashi; Shibechari River chashi and Appetsu chashi; Moshiriya chashi; Yukuepira chashi; Katsuragaoka chashi; Nemuro Peninsula chashi; and Tsurugataicharanke chashi. Others known include the Arashiyama casi, Harutoru casi, Onibishi's casi, Sarushina casi, Sashirui casi, Setanai casi, and Uraike casi. Although there are nineteen chashi on the Shiretoko Peninsula, it is inscribed as a Natural rather than a mixed Natural and Cultural UNESCO World Heritage Site.

== Functions ==
In addition to providing for defence against rival Ainu, casi functioned as centres for gatherings and rituals. They also served as "visible symbols of chiefdom power". According to narrative uepeker or folktales, Akkeshi and Nemuro Ainu attacked the Uraike casi in the hope of "fine treasure"; other casi were attacked by hungry Ainu looking for venison and dried salmon.

== See also ==
- Japanese castle
- Gusuku
- List of Historic Sites of Japan (Hokkaidō)
