= Cape Nosappu =

Easternmost point in Hokkaido, Japan

- Cape
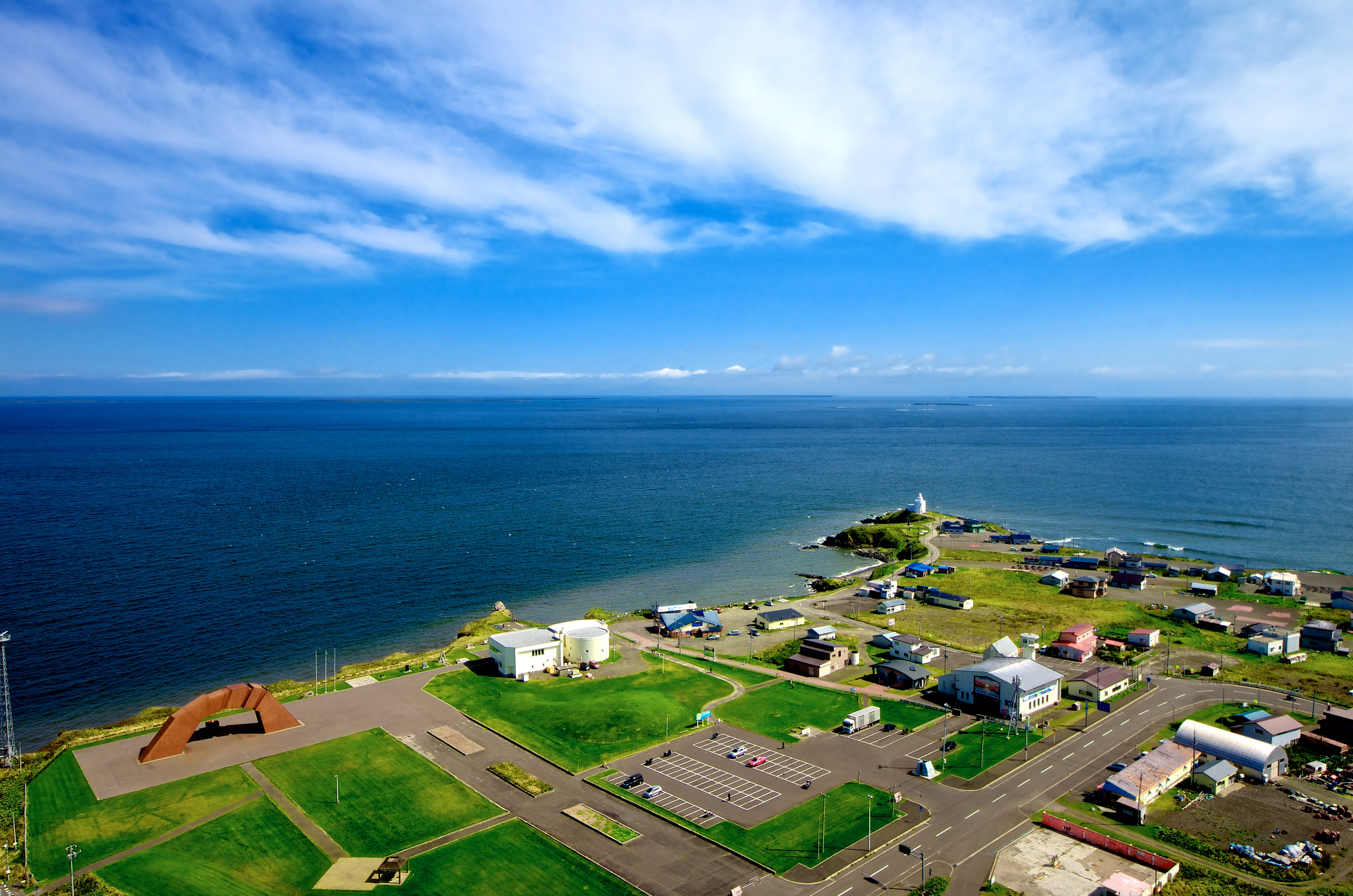
- Cape Nosappu in 2015
- Interactive map of Cape Nosappu
- Coordinates: 43°23′07″N 145°49′02″E
- Location: Nemuro Peninsula, Nemuro, Japan

Cape Nosappu (Japanese: 納沙布岬, Hepburn: Nosappu-misaki) is a point on the Nemuro Peninsula, Nemuro, Japan, which is the easternmost point in Hokkaidō. It is also the easternmost point in Japan which is open to the public. It is located where the waters from the Pacific Ocean meet those from the Sea of Okhotsk. The Cape Nosappu Lighthouse is the oldest in Hokkaidō, built in 1872.

The cape is very close to the Habomai Archipelago, which is administered by Russia. The closest island, Signalny Rock, is just 3.7 km away. As such, Russian patrol boats frequently appear on the strait. However, Japan claims the sovereignty over these islands. (See Kuril Islands dispute.) Consequently, the cape houses a lot of monuments dealing with Japanese claims on the territories, such as the House of Nostalgia for the Homeland, the Bridge on the Four Islands, and others.

== Gallery ==
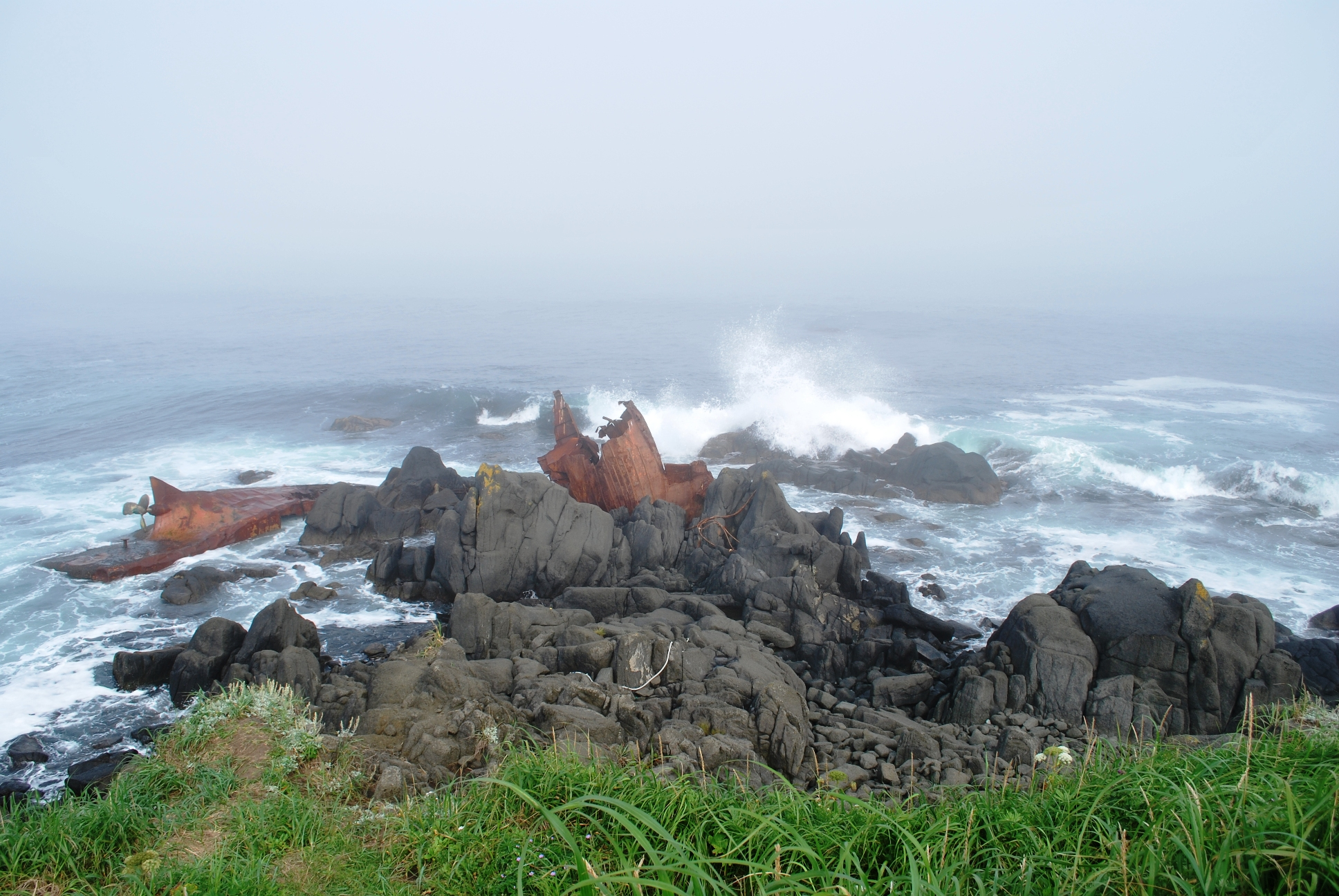
A Russian ship abandoned after being stranded off Cape Nosappu Lighthouse (August 2009)

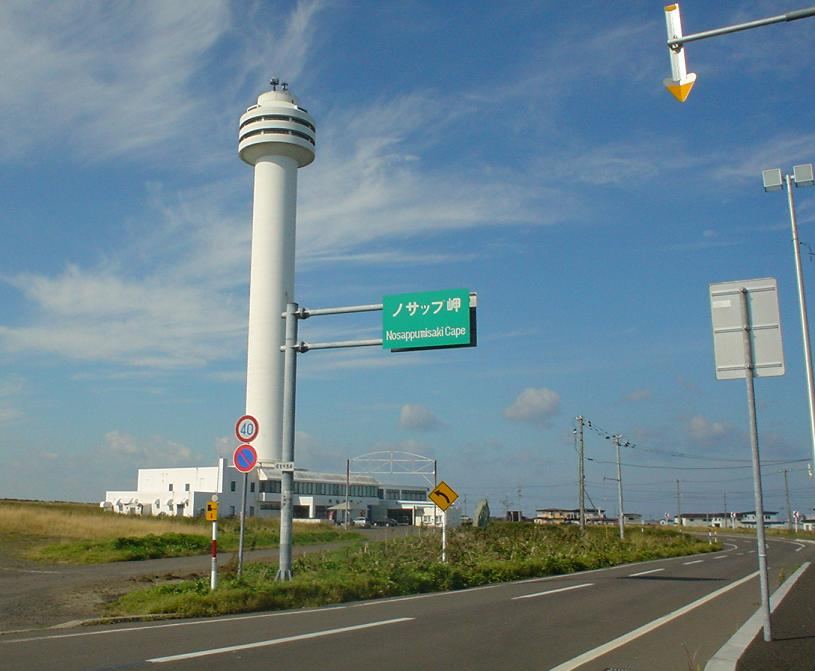
Aurora Tower

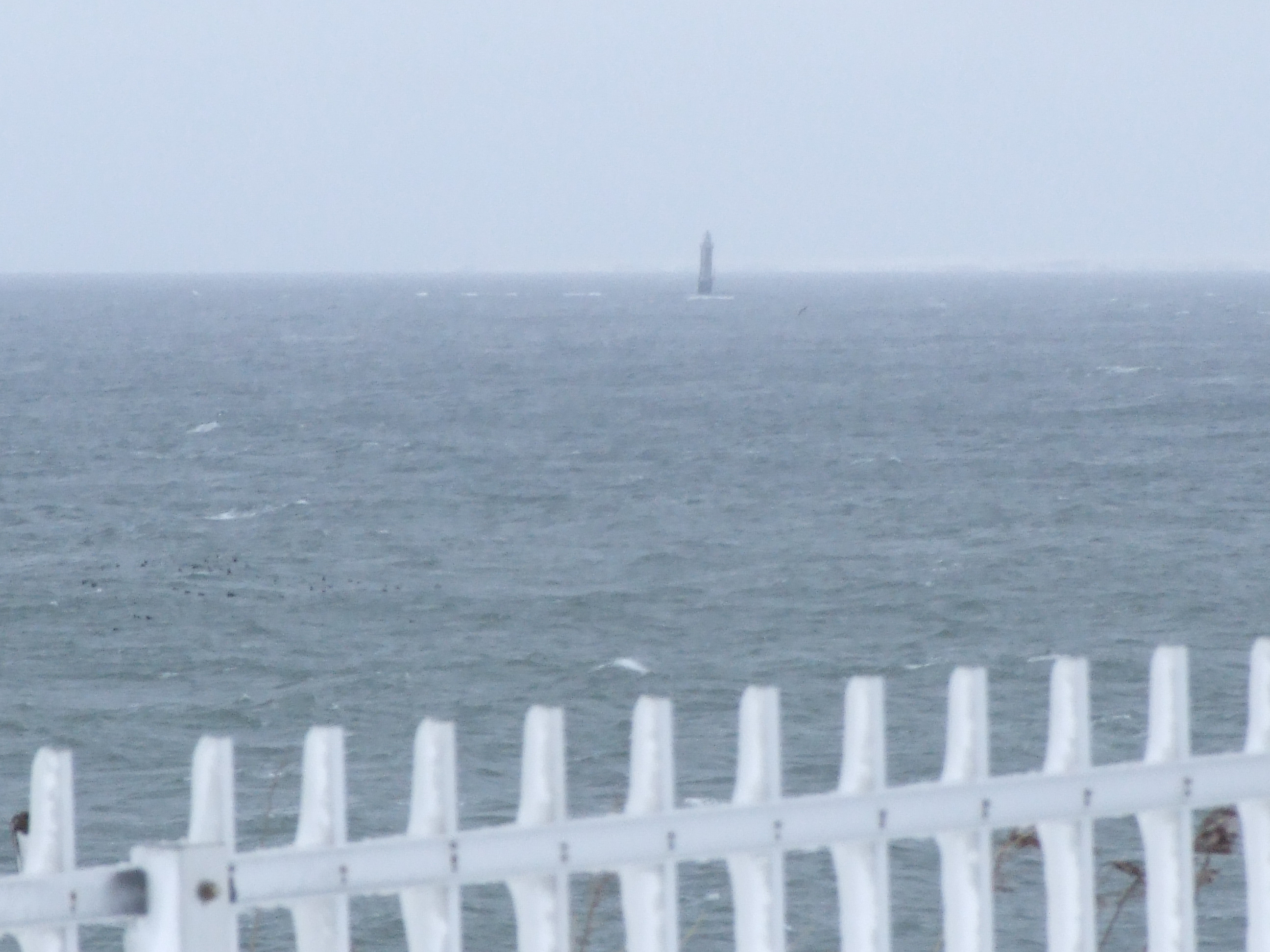
Signalny Rock, as seen from Cape Nosappu

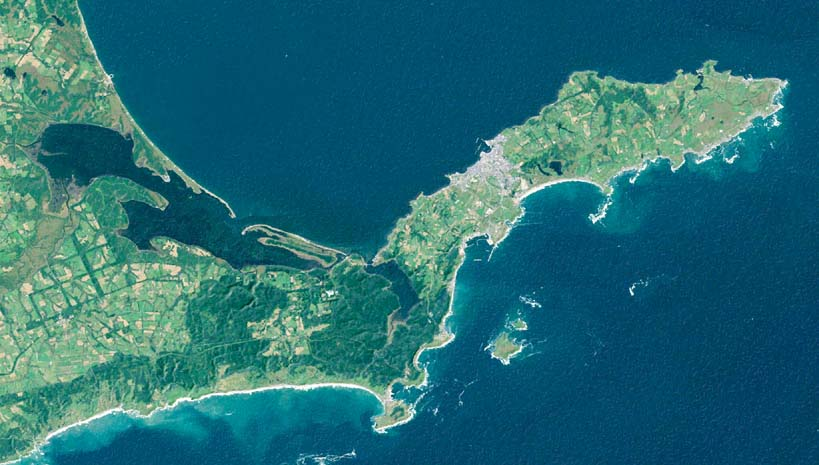
Landsat image of Cape Nosappu

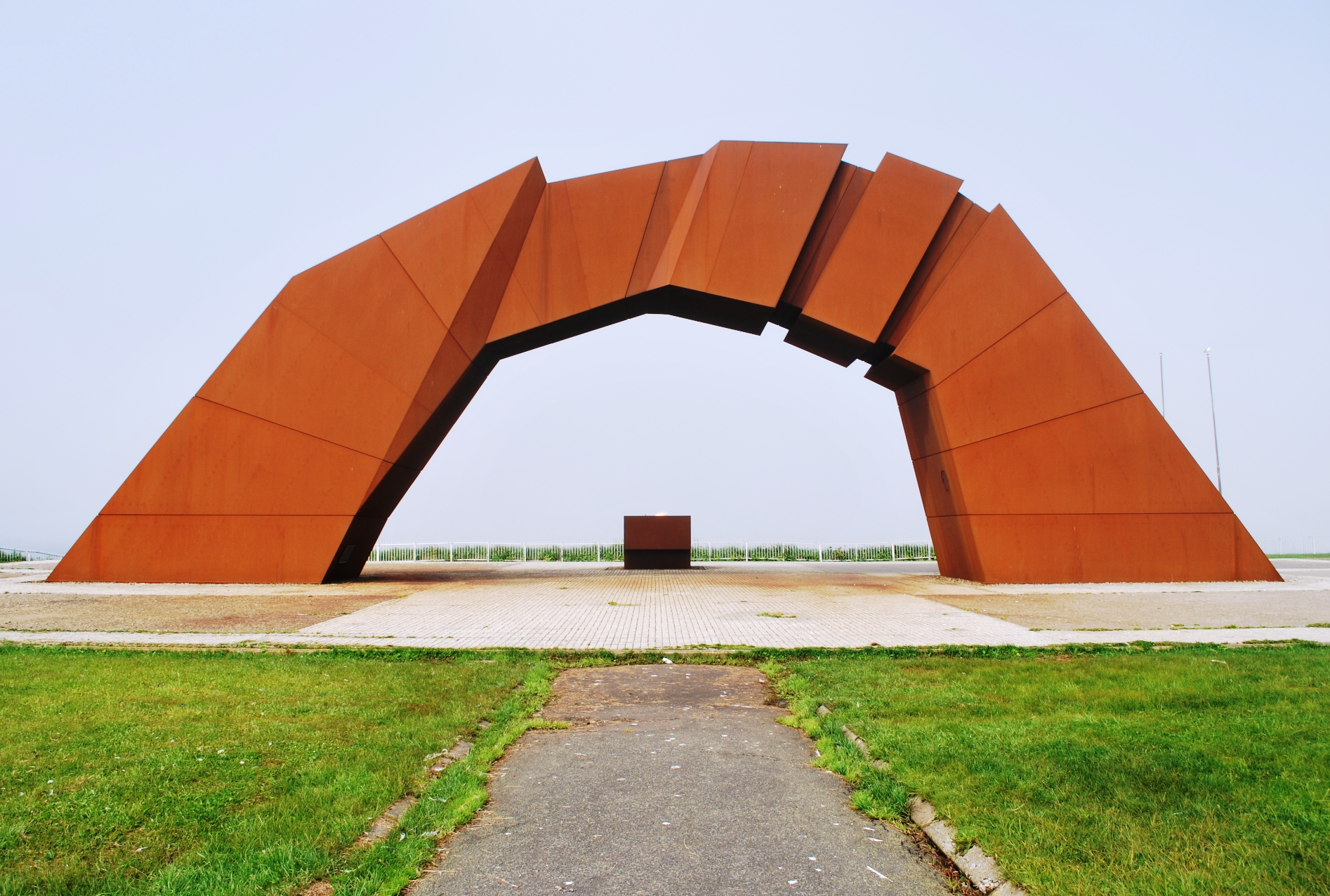
The Four Islands Bridge, a monument dedicated to the return of the southernmost Kuril Island (i.e. the "Northern Territories") to Japanese sovereignty

== Climate ==
Climate data for Cape Nosappu, 1991–2020 normals, extremes 1977–present
Month	Jan	Feb	Mar	Apr	May	Jun	Jul	Aug	Sep	Oct	Nov	Dec	Year
Record high °C (°F)	7.5 (45.5)	7.0 (44.6)	12.9 (55.2)	23.0 (73.4)	31.6 (88.9)	31.0 (87.8)	30.2 (86.4)	33.5 (92.3)	29.7 (85.5)	23.7 (74.7)	17.9 (64.2)	11.9 (53.4)	33.5 (92.3)
Mean daily maximum °C (°F)	−0.7 (30.7)	−1.2 (29.8)	1.8 (35.2)	6.7 (44.1)	10.9 (51.6)	13.8 (56.8)	17.8 (64.0)	20.4 (68.7)	19.4 (66.9)	14.8 (58.6)	8.9 (48.0)	2.4 (36.3)	9.6 (49.2)
Daily mean °C (°F)	−3.0 (26.6)	−3.7 (25.3)	−1.0 (30.2)	3.0 (37.4)	6.8 (44.2)	10.1 (50.2)	14.0 (57.2)	16.8 (62.2)	16.0 (60.8)	11.7 (53.1)	5.8 (42.4)	−0.2 (31.6)	6.4 (43.4)
Mean daily minimum °C (°F)	−5.9 (21.4)	−6.7 (19.9)	−4.0 (24.8)	−0.1 (31.8)	3.8 (38.8)	7.3 (45.1)	11.3 (52.3)	14.2 (57.6)	13.2 (55.8)	8.4 (47.1)	2.4 (36.3)	−3.3 (26.1)	3.4 (38.1)
Record low °C (°F)	−16.4 (2.5)	−19.6 (−3.3)	−18.1 (−0.6)	−7.9 (17.8)	−4.0 (24.8)	1.3 (34.3)	3.8 (38.8)	7.0 (44.6)	4.9 (40.8)	−0.4 (31.3)	−7.3 (18.9)	−13.0 (8.6)	−19.6 (−3.3)
Average precipitation mm (inches)	18.9 (0.74)	14.6 (0.57)	37.4 (1.47)	53.9 (2.12)	82.9 (3.26)	93.6 (3.69)	107.7 (4.24)	116.3 (4.58)	130.6 (5.14)	103.3 (4.07)	75.2 (2.96)	49.2 (1.94)	883.6 (34.78)
Average precipitation days (≥ 1.0 mm)	5.6	4.3	6.5	7.8	9.7	8.9	9.8	10.3	10.1	9.3	9.6	7.9	99.8
Mean monthly sunshine hours	150.2	169.9	202.2	190.2	169.0	134.3	116.8	129.0	153.2	168.9	145.9	145.0	1,875.2
Source 1: JMA
Source 2: JMA

== See also ==
- Extreme points of Japan
