= Nemuro, Hokkaido =

Nemuro 根室市
- City
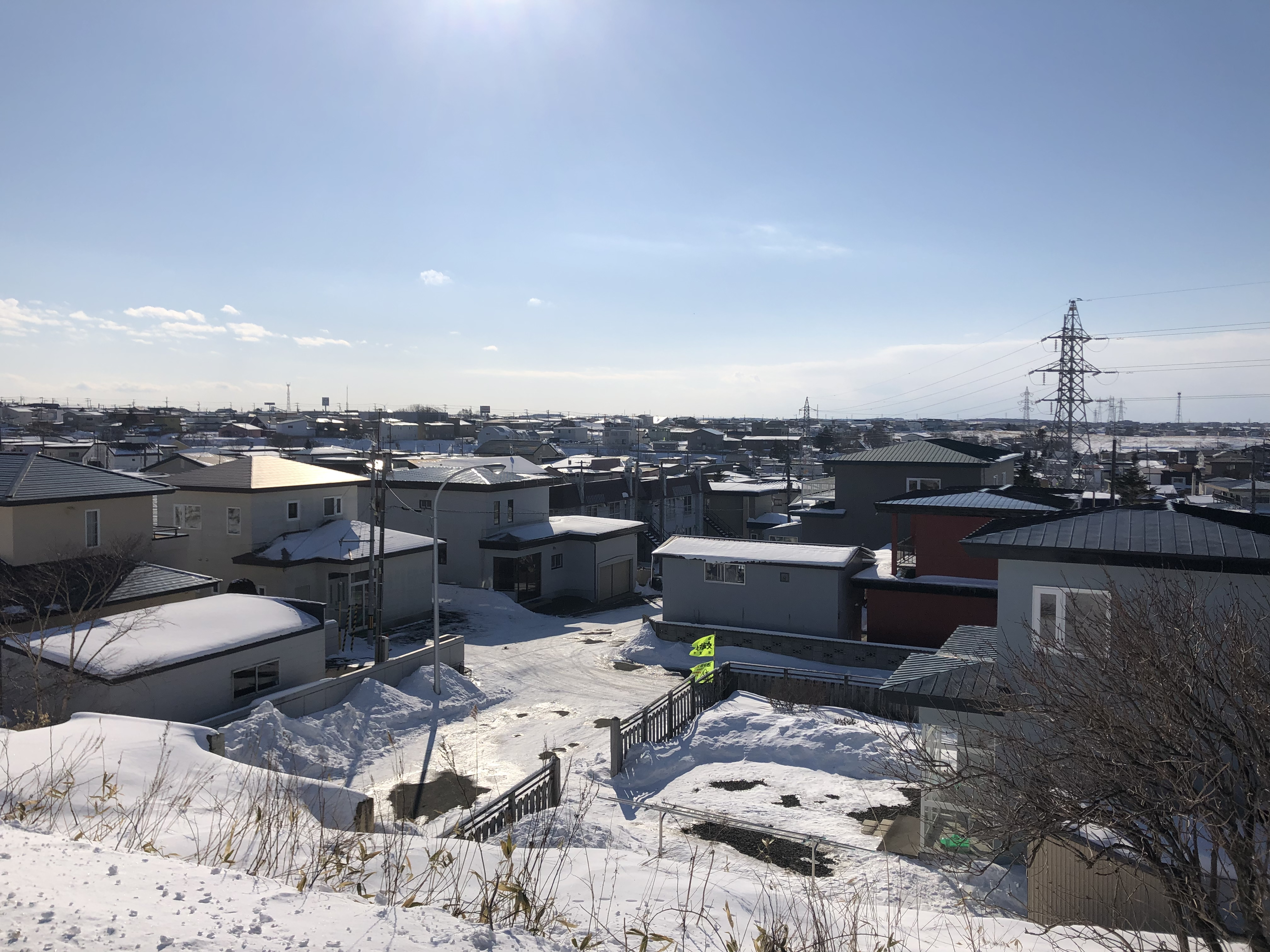
- Nemuro City in 2019

- Flag Seal

- Location of Nemuro in Hokkaido (Nemuro Subprefecture)

- Location in Japan
- Coordinates: 43°19′48″N 145°34′58″E
- Country: Japan
- Region: Hokkaido
- Prefecture: Hokkaido (Nemuro Subprefecture)
- First official recorded: 1635
- City settled: August 1, 1957

Government
  - Mayor: Masatoshi Ishigaki

Area
  - Total: 512.63 km^{2} (197.93 sq mi)

Population (August 30, 2026)
  - Total: 21,632
  - Density: 56.74/km^{2} (147.0/sq mi)
- Time zone: UTC+09:00 (JST)
- City hall address: 2-27 Tokiwachō, Nemuro-shi, Hokkaido; 087-8711
- Website: www.city.nemuro.hokkaido.jp
- Symbols
- Bird: Swan
- Flower: Yukiwarikozakura (Primula modesta var. fauriei)
- Tree: Chishimazakura (Prunus nipponica var. kurilensis)

Nemuro (Japanese: 根室市, Hepburn: Nemuro-shi; Japanese pronunciation: [né̞.mɯ̈̀.ɾò̞, nè̞.mɯ̈́.ɾó̞.ɕì]; Ainu: ニ・ム・オロ, romanized: Ni-mu-oro) is a city and port located in Nemuro Subprefecture, Hokkaido, Japan. It is the capital city of Nemuro Subprefecture. Much of the city lies on the Nemuro Peninsula. As of August 2026, the city has an estimated population of 21,632, with 12,015 households, and a population density of 56.74 persons per km^{2} (147.0 persons per sq. mi.). The total area is 512.63 km^{2} (197.93 sq mi).

== History ==
Nemuro was developed by fisheries. In the early Meiji period, it was the largest city in eastern Hokkaido.

- 1900 Nemuro town was founded.
- 1906 Wada village was founded.
- 1915 Habomai village was founded.
- 1957 Nemuro town and Wada village were merged to form Nemuro city.
- 1959 Habomai village was merged into Nemuro city.

== Climate ==
Nemuro, like most of Hokkaido, has a humid continental climate (Köppen climate classification Dfb), but not far from a marine climate (Köppen climate classification: Cfb) using the −3.0 °C (27 °F) isotherm due to its low amplitude for a location close to mainland Asia and average temperatures during the winter. It has mild to warm summers and cold snowy winters. Like the more northerly Kuril Islands, it has an extremely strong seasonal lag, with the highest temperatures in August and September and lowest in February, though it is not so gloomy as extremely foggy North Pacific islands like Simushir or the Aleutian Islands in general. Its peninsular location makes Nemuro very windy, especially during autumn and winter, with mean wind speeds as high as 22.7 kilometres per hour (14.1 mph) in November.

Climate data for Nemuro (elevation 25.2 m, 1991–2020 normals, extremes 1879–present)
Month	Jan	Feb	Mar	Apr	May	Jun	Jul	Aug	Sep	Oct	Nov	Dec	Year
Record high °C (°F)	10.3 (50.5)	11.8 (53.2)	14.7 (58.5)	23.3 (73.9)	34.0 (93.2)	32.1 (89.8)	33.9 (93.0)	33.6 (92.5)	29.5 (85.1)	24.7 (76.5)	19.2 (66.6)	13.6 (56.5)	34.0 (93.2)
Mean maximum °C (°F)	4.5 (40.1)	4.9 (40.8)	9.1 (48.4)	17.0 (62.6)	22.2 (72.0)	23.5 (74.3)	27.0 (80.6)	28.6 (83.5)	25.5 (77.9)	20.2 (68.4)	15.3 (59.5)	8.9 (48.0)	29.5 (85.1)
Mean daily maximum °C (°F)	−0.9 (30.4)	−1.2 (29.8)	2.2 (36.0)	7.4 (45.3)	11.9 (53.4)	14.9 (58.8)	18.7 (65.7)	20.9 (69.6)	19.4 (66.9)	14.7 (58.5)	8.6 (47.5)	2.1 (35.8)	9.9 (49.8)
Daily mean °C (°F)	−3.4 (25.9)	−3.8 (25.2)	−0.8 (30.6)	3.5 (38.3)	7.7 (45.9)	10.9 (51.6)	14.9 (58.8)	17.4 (63.3)	16.2 (61.2)	11.6 (52.9)	5.6 (42.1)	−0.5 (31.1)	6.6 (43.9)
Mean daily minimum °C (°F)	−6.5 (20.3)	−7.1 (19.2)	−3.7 (25.3)	0.5 (32.9)	4.5 (40.1)	8.1 (46.6)	12.1 (53.8)	14.8 (58.6)	13.6 (56.5)	8.5 (47.3)	2.3 (36.1)	−3.6 (25.5)	3.6 (38.5)
Mean minimum °C (°F)	−11.6 (11.1)	−12.3 (9.9)	−8.9 (16.0)	−3.7 (25.3)	0.9 (33.6)	4.4 (39.9)	8.2 (46.8)	10.8 (51.4)	8.9 (48.0)	3.1 (37.6)	−3.5 (25.7)	−8.3 (17.1)	−12.9 (8.8)
Record low °C (°F)	−22.7 (−8.9)	−22.9 (−9.2)	−21.1 (−6.0)	−13.4 (7.9)	−6.7 (19.9)	−4.9 (23.2)	0.4 (32.7)	6.3 (43.3)	1.7 (35.1)	−3.3 (26.1)	−10.6 (12.9)	−15.1 (4.8)	−22.9 (−9.2)
Average precipitation mm (inches)	30.6 (1.20)	23.5 (0.93)	47.0 (1.85)	64.4 (2.54)	96.2 (3.79)	103.0 (4.06)	115.1 (4.53)	132.3 (5.21)	160.0 (6.30)	126.1 (4.96)	83.2 (3.28)	59.0 (2.32)	1,040.4 (40.96)
Average snowfall cm (inches)	43 (17)	39 (15)	36 (14)	12 (4.7)	0 (0)	0 (0)	0 (0)	0 (0)	0 (0)	0 (0)	2 (0.8)	28 (11)	159 (63)
Average precipitation days (≥ 0.5 mm)	9.7	6.3	9.4	10.6	11.3	10.1	11.0	11.8	11.5	10.7	10.8	10.4	123.6
Average snowy days	23.2	20.5	19.4	12.9	2.6	0.0	0.0	0.0	0.0	0.7	6.1	17.5	105.3
Average relative humidity (%)	71	72	75	78	83	89	91	89	84	76	70	69	79
Mean monthly sunshine hours	154.4	164.1	190.8	180.9	171.6	135.5	117.3	124.6	144.5	162.8	148.2	151.8	1,846.7
Source: Japan Meteorological Agency (1991–2020 normals, extremes 1879–present)

Climate data for Nosappu, Nemuro (elevation 12 m, 1991–2020 normals, extremes 1977–present)
Month	Jan	Feb	Mar	Apr	May	Jun	Jul	Aug	Sep	Oct	Nov	Dec	Year
Record high °C (°F)	8.3 (46.9)	10.9 (51.6)	13.1 (55.6)	23.0 (73.4)	31.6 (88.9)	31.0 (87.8)	33.3 (91.9)	33.5 (92.3)	29.7 (85.5)	25.2 (77.4)	17.9 (64.2)	13.9 (57.0)	33.5 (92.3)
Mean daily maximum °C (°F)	−0.7 (30.7)	−1.2 (29.8)	1.8 (35.2)	6.7 (44.1)	10.9 (51.6)	13.8 (56.8)	17.8 (64.0)	20.4 (68.7)	19.4 (66.9)	14.8 (58.6)	8.9 (48.0)	2.4 (36.3)	9.6 (49.3)
Daily mean °C (°F)	−3.0 (26.6)	−3.7 (25.3)	−1.0 (30.2)	3.0 (37.4)	6.8 (44.2)	10.1 (50.2)	14.0 (57.2)	16.8 (62.2)	16.0 (60.8)	11.7 (53.1)	5.8 (42.4)	−0.2 (31.6)	6.3 (43.3)
Mean daily minimum °C (°F)	−5.9 (21.4)	−6.7 (19.9)	−4.0 (24.8)	−0.1 (31.8)	3.8 (38.8)	7.3 (45.1)	11.3 (52.3)	14.2 (57.6)	13.2 (55.8)	8.4 (47.1)	2.4 (36.3)	−3.3 (26.1)	3.4 (38.1)
Record low °C (°F)	−16.4 (2.5)	−19.6 (−3.3)	−18.1 (−0.6)	−7.9 (17.8)	−4.0 (24.8)	1.3 (34.3)	3.8 (38.8)	7.0 (44.6)	4.9 (40.8)	−0.4 (31.3)	−7.3 (18.9)	−13.0 (8.6)	−19.6 (−3.3)
Average precipitation mm (inches)	18.9 (0.74)	14.6 (0.57)	37.4 (1.47)	53.9 (2.12)	82.9 (3.26)	93.6 (3.69)	107.7 (4.24)	116.3 (4.58)	130.6 (5.14)	103.3 (4.07)	75.2 (2.96)	49.2 (1.94)	889.1 (35.00)
Average precipitation days (≥ 1.0 mm)	5.6	4.3	6.5	7.8	9.7	8.9	9.8	10.3	10.1	9.3	9.6	7.9	99.7
Mean monthly sunshine hours	150.2	169.9	202.2	190.2	169.0	134.3	116.8	129.0	153.2	168.9	145.9	145.0	1,875.2
Source: Japan Meteorological Agency (1991–2020 normals, extremes 1977–present)

Climate data for Attoko, Nemuro (elevation 41 m, 1991–2020 normals, extremes 1977–present)
Month	Jan	Feb	Mar	Apr	May	Jun	Jul	Aug	Sep	Oct	Nov	Dec	Year
Record high °C (°F)	7.6 (45.7)	11.4 (52.5)	16.2 (61.2)	23.0 (73.4)	34.2 (93.6)	31.8 (89.2)	34.2 (93.6)	34.9 (94.8)	30.2 (86.4)	24.7 (76.5)	20.0 (68.0)	12.7 (54.9)	34.9 (94.8)
Mean daily maximum °C (°F)	−1.1 (30.0)	−1.0 (30.2)	2.6 (36.7)	8.3 (46.9)	13.3 (55.9)	16.3 (61.3)	20.0 (68.0)	21.9 (71.4)	20.0 (68.0)	15.1 (59.2)	8.6 (47.5)	1.7 (35.1)	10.5 (50.9)
Daily mean °C (°F)	−6.0 (21.2)	−5.8 (21.6)	−1.7 (28.9)	3.3 (37.9)	7.9 (46.2)	11.5 (52.7)	15.4 (59.7)	17.5 (63.5)	15.4 (59.7)	9.9 (49.8)	3.6 (38.5)	−3.1 (26.4)	5.6 (42.1)
Mean daily minimum °C (°F)	−11.8 (10.8)	−11.9 (10.6)	−6.7 (19.9)	−1.4 (29.5)	3.1 (37.6)	7.6 (45.7)	12.0 (53.6)	14.0 (57.2)	10.9 (51.6)	4.3 (39.7)	−2.0 (28.4)	−8.6 (16.5)	0.8 (33.4)
Record low °C (°F)	−25.7 (−14.3)	−27.6 (−17.7)	−25.2 (−13.4)	−11.5 (11.3)	−5.7 (21.7)	−3.4 (25.9)	1.8 (35.2)	3.6 (38.5)	−0.7 (30.7)	−7.1 (19.2)	−14.2 (6.4)	−22.1 (−7.8)	−27.6 (−17.7)
Average precipitation mm (inches)	37.2 (1.46)	27.7 (1.09)	57.8 (2.28)	78.8 (3.10)	110.2 (4.34)	117.1 (4.61)	124.7 (4.91)	142.6 (5.61)	172.9 (6.81)	137.0 (5.39)	85.3 (3.36)	67.5 (2.66)	1,158.8 (45.62)
Average snowfall cm (inches)	85 (33)	77 (30)	76 (30)	28 (11)	3 (1.2)	0 (0)	0 (0)	0 (0)	0 (0)	0 (0)	8 (3.1)	65 (26)	344 (135)
Average precipitation days (≥ 1.0 mm)	6.9	5.6	8.2	9.5	10.7	9.6	10.3	11.4	11.3	9.6	9.4	8.6	111.1
Mean monthly sunshine hours	164.0	163.5	180.9	163.2	158.4	127.3	108.3	117.7	142.0	162.4	149.3	154.7	1,794.1
Source: Japan Meteorological Agency (1991–2020 normals, extremes 1977–present)

== Transportation ==
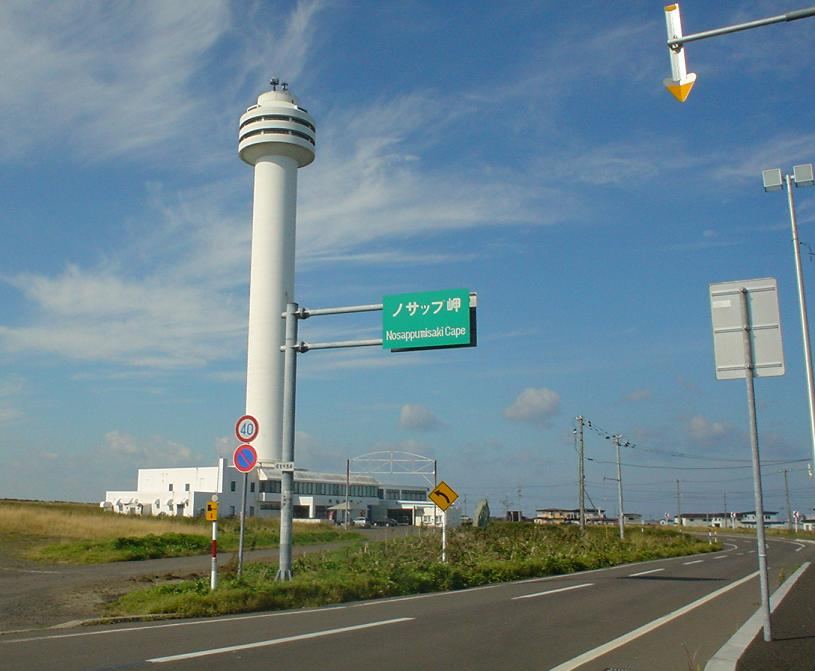
A road to Cape Nosappu

=== Air ===
Nearby Nakashibetsu Airport serves Nemuro.

=== Rail ===
- Hokkaido Railway Company (JR Hokkaido) – Nemuro Main Line
  - Stations in the city: Nemuro – Nishi-Wada – Kombumori – Ochiishi – Bettoga – Attoko

=== Road ===
- National Route 44
- National Route 243

== Sightseeing ==
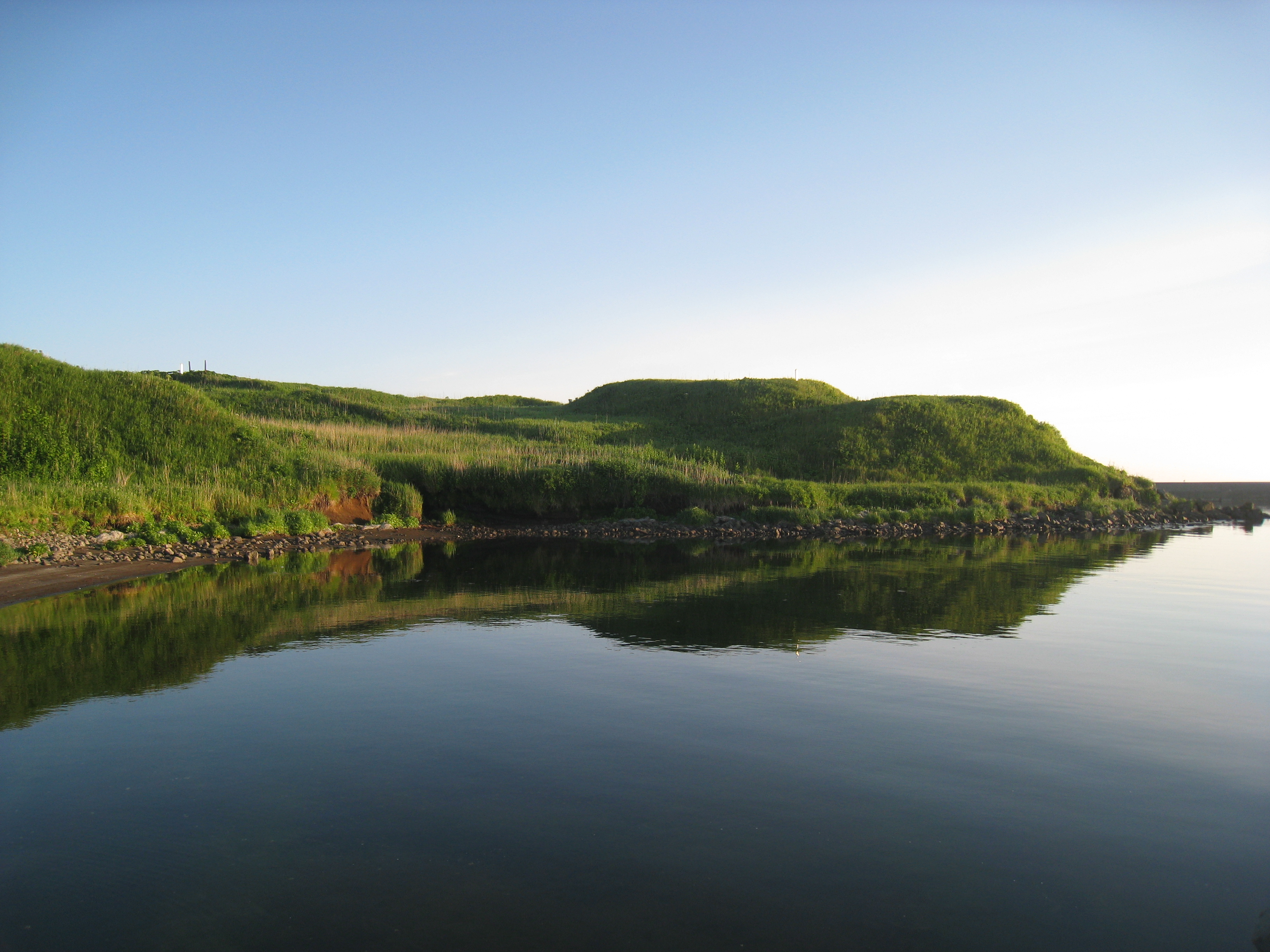
The ruins of Chashi at Onnemoto, Nemuro

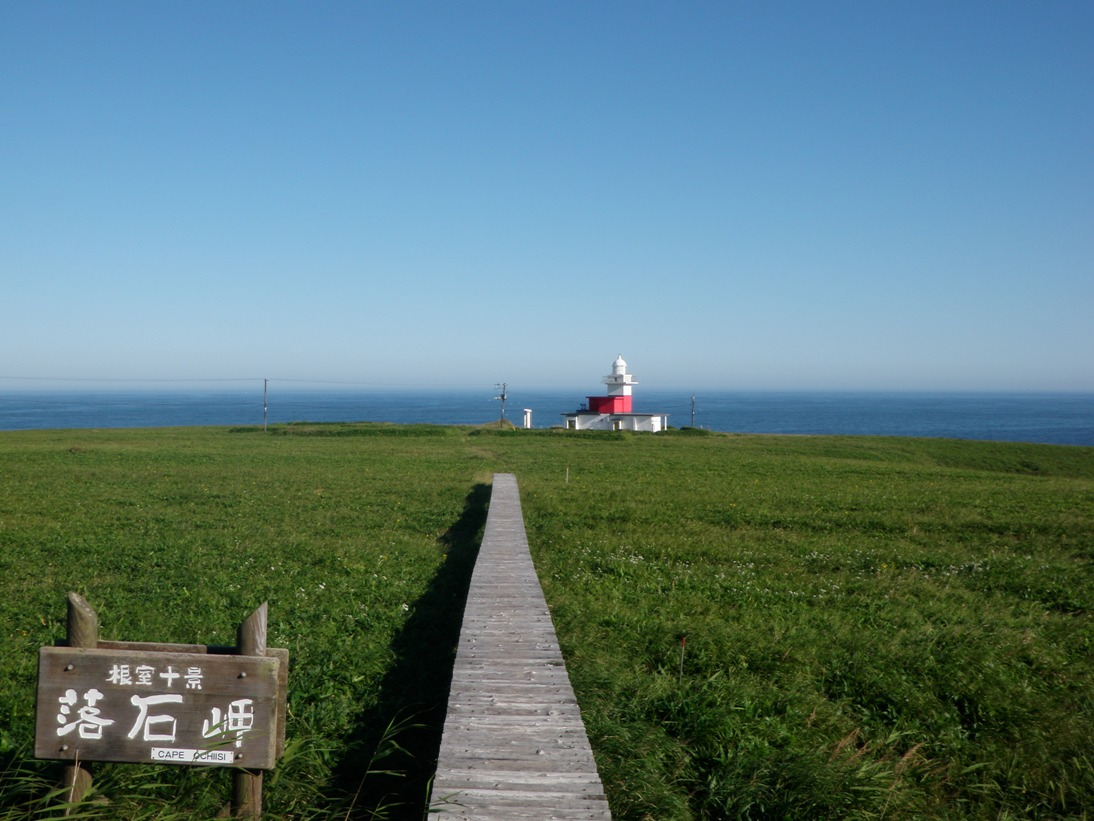
Cape Ochiishi

- Cape Nosappu
- Cape Hanasaki, including "Kurumaishi", a car wheel-shaped stone natural monument
- Cape Ochiishi, a fishing port
- The Ruins of Chashi in the Nemuro Peninsula
- Habomai Fishing Port
- Kotohira Shrine
- Lake Furen
- Lake Onnetō
- Meiji Park
- Ohashi Bridge
- Roadside station Swan 44 Nemuro
- Shunkunitai Wild Bird Sanctuary

== Cuisine ==
One local specialty of Nemuro is "escalope". This consists of tonkatsu (breaded deep-fried pork cutlets) over butter fried rice with a special demiglace sauce.

Nemuro is well known by the people of Hokkaido for its sushi because of the seafood caught there. Nemuro's seafood delicacies include Pacific saury, salmon, king crab, and shrimp.

Other delicacies in Nemuro include yakitori bento, Holland sanbei (waffle-like snack), soft serve ice cream, and monjayaki.

== Economy ==
Nemuro's economy is based on its fishing industry as many types of marine animals are found in the area all year long. Dairy processing is also an important part of the local economy. Local businesses like restaurants and tourism also plays a significant role in the economy. Nemuro boasts the largest catches of Pacific saury in all of Japan, which has led to efforts to export saury to Southeast Asia, especially Vietnam.

== Education ==
=== High schools ===
- Hokkaido Nemuro High School

== Mascot ==
Nemuro-kun, the town's mascot

Nemuro's mascot is Nemuro-kun (ねむろうくん). He is a fisherman owl who stores seafood products in his pocket. He is asleep and usually sleep-walks during the day but is active during the night. He was unveiled in April 2016.

== Sister cities ==
Nemuro is twinned with the following sister cities:

- Kurobe, Toyama, Japan
- Severo-Kurilsk, Russia
- Sitka, Alaska, United States
- Tebedu, Sarawak, Malaysia
