= Nemuro Peninsula =

Peninsula in Hokkaidō Prefecture, Japan

Coordinates: 43°23′07″N 145°49′00″E

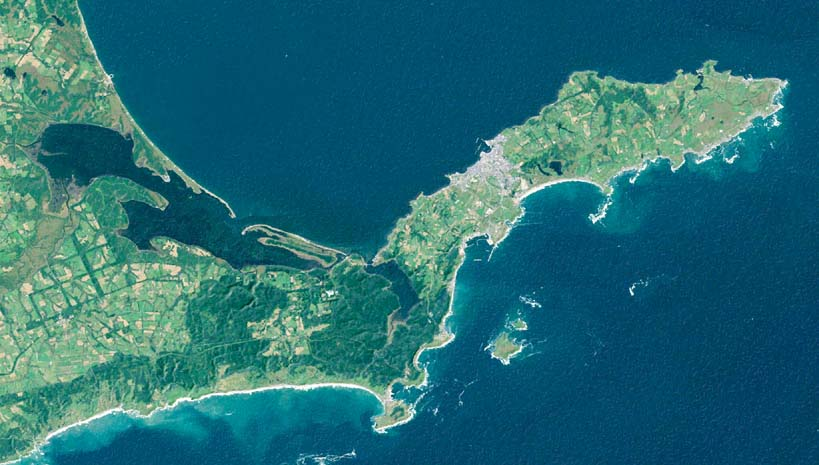
Landsat image

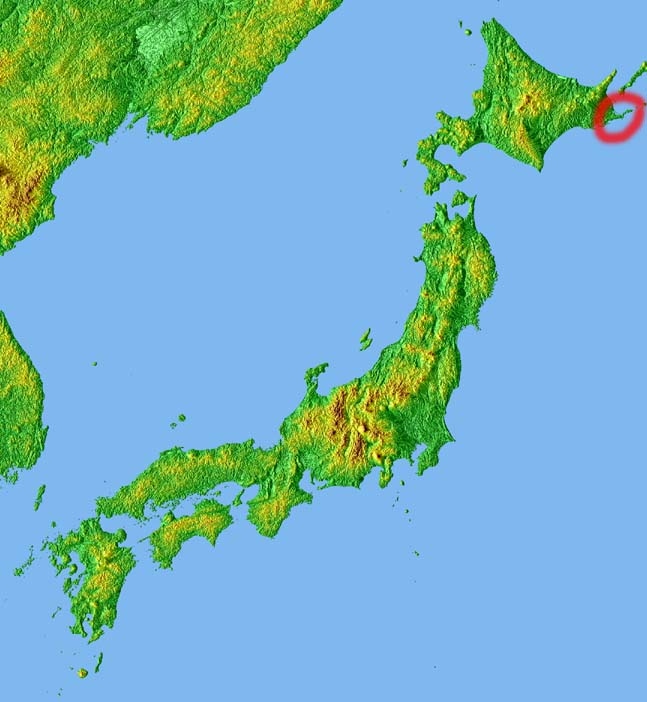
Geographic Location

The Nemuro Peninsula (根室半島 Nemuro-hantō) is a peninsula which extends from the east coast of Hokkaidō, Japan. It is some 30 kilometres (19 mi) long and 8 kilometres (5.0 mi) wide, and forms part of Nemuro City. Cape Nosappu at its tip is the easternmost point of Hokkaidō. The northern coastline is on Nemuro Bay, while the south faces the Pacific Ocean. Islands of the Habomai (Khabomai) Archipelago, administered by Russia but claimed by Japan, extend eastward from the peninsula.

== Climate ==
Most of the Nemuro Peninsula has a humid continental climate (Köppen climate classification Dfb). However, due to the influence of the Seasonal lag, the midsummer season is often scheduled from the end of August to the beginning of September. For example, spring in Cape Nosappu often doesn't arrive until the end of May, and in some years winter doesn't even end until the end of June. In 1983, due to the continuous cold wave, the winter in the area did not end until the end of July, and in August it immediately entered the summer; at the same time, the maximum temperature in June 1983 did not exceed 12 °C (54 °F).

Climate data for Cape Nosappu, 1991–2020 normals, extremes 1977–present
| Month | Jan | Feb | Mar | Apr | May | Jun | Jul | Aug | Sep | Oct | Nov | Dec | Year |
|---|---|---|---|---|---|---|---|---|---|---|---|---|---|
| Record high °C (°F) | 7.5 (45.5) | 7.0 (44.6) | 12.9 (55.2) | 23.0 (73.4) | 31.6 (88.9) | 31.0 (87.8) | 30.2 (86.4) | 33.5 (92.3) | 29.7 (85.5) | 23.7 (74.7) | 17.9 (64.2) | 11.9 (53.4) | 33.5 (92.3) |
| Mean daily maximum °C (°F) | −0.7 (30.7) | −1.2 (29.8) | 1.8 (35.2) | 6.7 (44.1) | 10.9 (51.6) | 13.8 (56.8) | 17.8 (64.0) | 20.4 (68.7) | 19.4 (66.9) | 14.8 (58.6) | 8.9 (48.0) | 2.4 (36.3) | 9.6 (49.2) |
| Daily mean °C (°F) | −3.0 (26.6) | −3.7 (25.3) | −1.0 (30.2) | 3.0 (37.4) | 6.8 (44.2) | 10.1 (50.2) | 14.0 (57.2) | 16.8 (62.2) | 16.0 (60.8) | 11.7 (53.1) | 5.8 (42.4) | −0.2 (31.6) | 6.4 (43.4) |
| Mean daily minimum °C (°F) | −5.9 (21.4) | −6.7 (19.9) | −4.0 (24.8) | −0.1 (31.8) | 3.8 (38.8) | 7.3 (45.1) | 11.3 (52.3) | 14.2 (57.6) | 13.2 (55.8) | 8.4 (47.1) | 2.4 (36.3) | −3.3 (26.1) | 3.4 (38.1) |
| Record low °C (°F) | −16.4 (2.5) | −19.6 (−3.3) | −18.1 (−0.6) | −7.9 (17.8) | −4.0 (24.8) | 1.3 (34.3) | 3.8 (38.8) | 7.0 (44.6) | 4.9 (40.8) | −0.4 (31.3) | −7.3 (18.9) | −13.0 (8.6) | −19.6 (−3.3) |
| Average precipitation mm (inches) | 18.9 (0.74) | 14.6 (0.57) | 37.4 (1.47) | 53.9 (2.12) | 82.9 (3.26) | 93.6 (3.69) | 107.7 (4.24) | 116.3 (4.58) | 130.6 (5.14) | 103.3 (4.07) | 75.2 (2.96) | 49.2 (1.94) | 883.6 (34.78) |
| Average precipitation days (≥ 1.0 mm) | 5.6 | 4.3 | 6.5 | 7.8 | 9.7 | 8.9 | 9.8 | 10.3 | 10.1 | 9.3 | 9.6 | 7.9 | 99.8 |
| Mean monthly sunshine hours | 150.2 | 169.9 | 202.2 | 190.2 | 169.0 | 134.3 | 116.8 | 129.0 | 153.2 | 168.9 | 145.9 | 145.0 | 1,875.2 |
Source 1: JMA
Source 2: JMA

== See also ==
- Kuril Islands dispute
- 1973 Nemuro earthquake
- Nemuro Peninsula Chashi Sites
