= Abashiri City Folk Museum =

- 網走市立郷土博物館
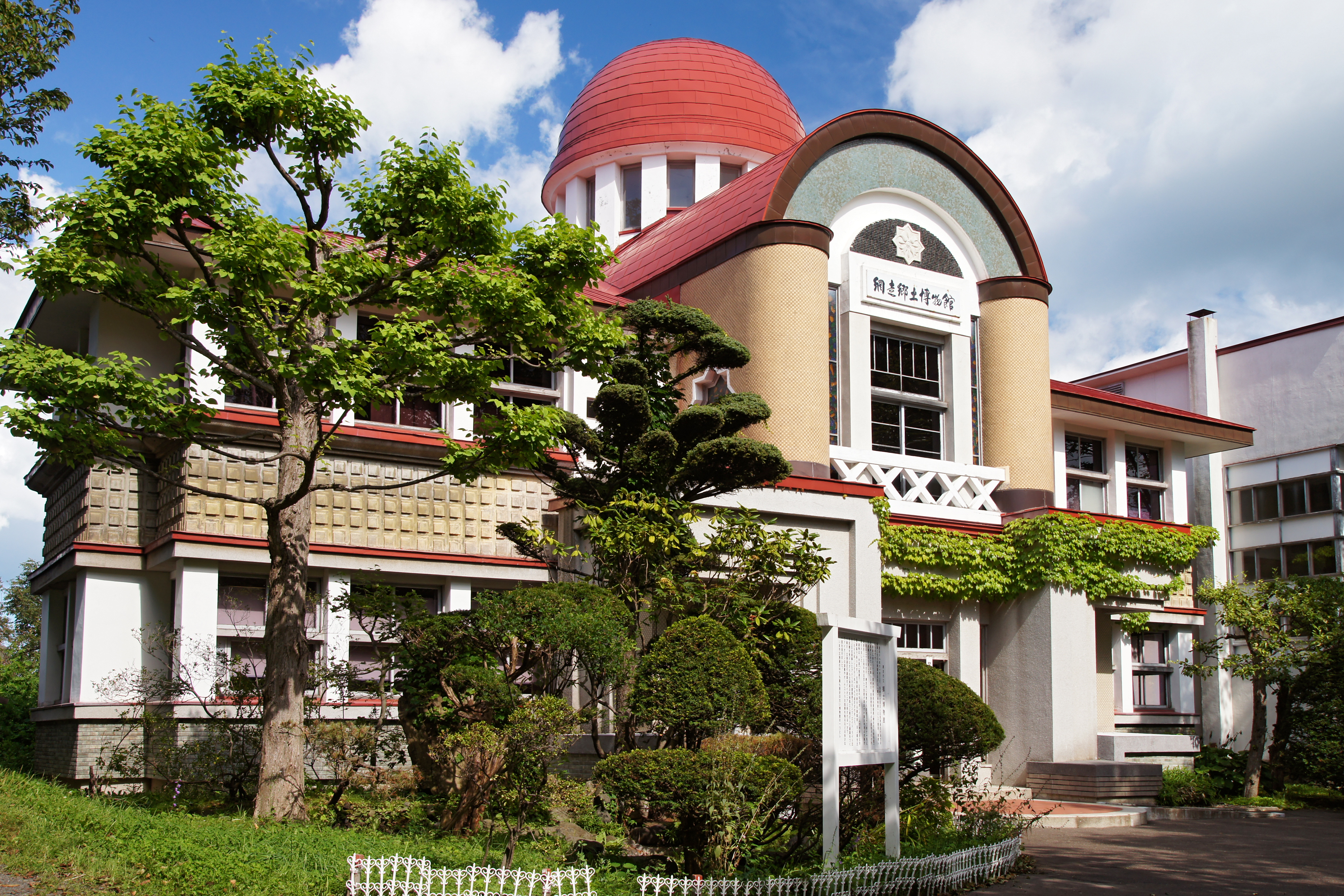
- Interactive map of the Abashiri City Folk Museum area

General information
- Location: 1-1 Katsura-machi, Abashiri, Hokkaidō, Japan
- Coordinates: 44°01′04″N 144°16′09″E
- Opened: 3 November 1936

Website
- Official website

Abashiri City Folk Museum (網走市立郷土博物館, Abashiri Shiritsu Kyōdo Hakubutsukan) opened as Kitami Kyōdo Yakata (北見郷土舘) in Abashiri, Hokkaidō, Japan in 1936, making it one of the oldest museums on the island. When the museum opened, the collection comprised some three-thousand archaeological and ethnographic objects collected by Yonemura Yoshio (米村喜男), including items from the Moyoro Shell Mound (モヨロ貝塚) (a national Historic Site). In 1948, the museum was transferred to the city. A new building was added in 1961 to celebrate 25 years from the original opening. Both the main building and the new building were designed by architect Tanoue Yoshiya, a pupil of Frank Lloyd Wright, and mark the transitions in his style. They are national Registered Tangible Cultural Properties.

The exhibits document the natural and cultural history of the area, from the Japanese Paleolithic, through the Jōmon and Zoku-Jōmon periods, up until daily life during the Shōwa era, and include materials relating to the Satsumon culture, Okhotsk culture, and Ainu. The Moyoro Shell Mound Museum operates as an annex.

== See also ==
- List of Historic Sites of Japan (Hokkaidō)
- Katsuragaoka Chashi
- Hokkaido Museum
- Abashiri Prison Museum
