= Onbetsu Station =

Railway station in Kushiro, Hokkaido, Japan

K45 Ombetsu Station 音別駅
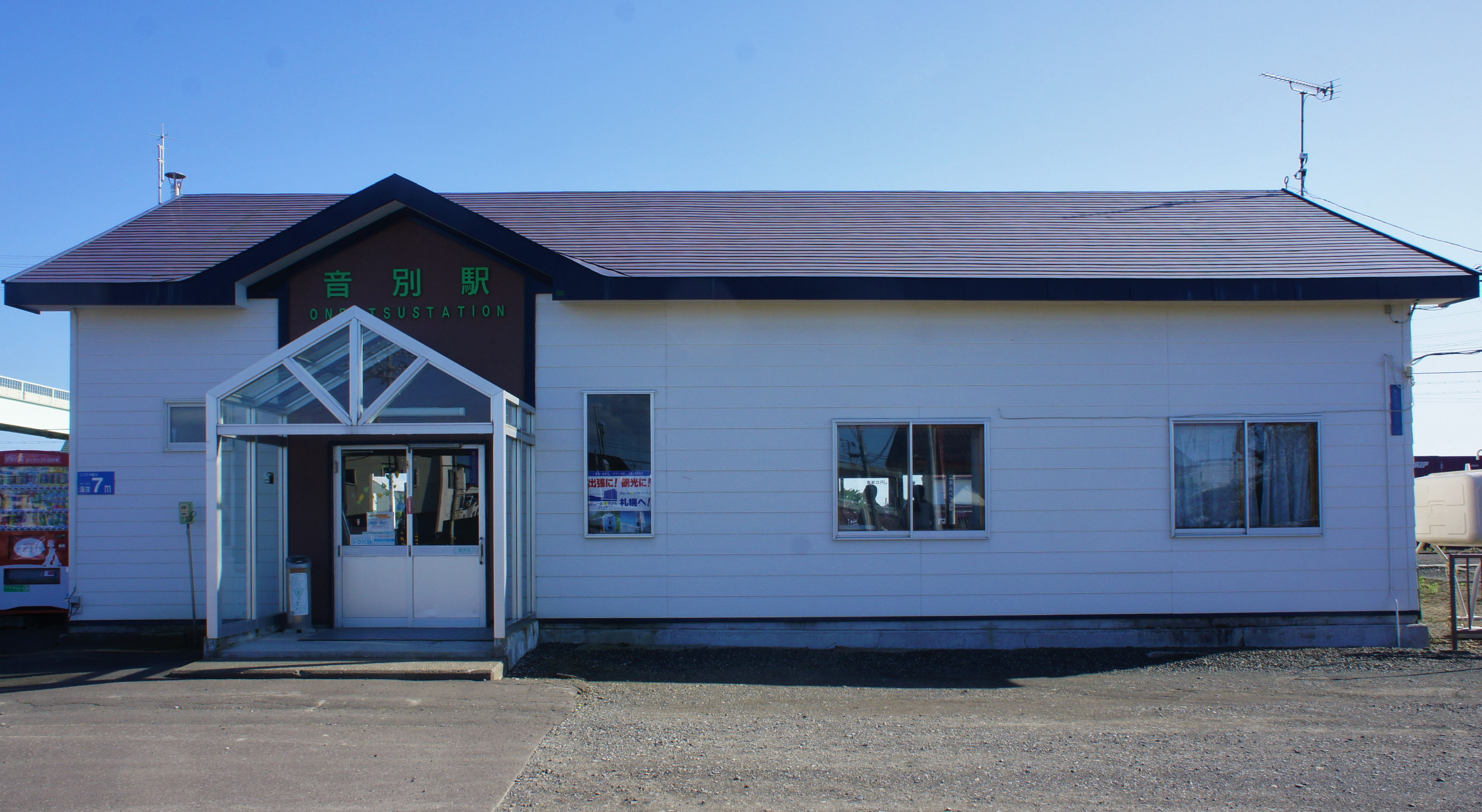
- Station building in September 2018

General information
- Location: 1 Chome Onbetsucho Motomachi, Kushiro, Hokkaido 088-0115; Japan
- Coordinates: 42°53′20.59″N 143°55′54.36″E
- System: regional rail
- Operator: JR Hokkaido; JR Freight
- Line: Nemuro Main Line
- Distance: 128.8km from Shintoku
- Platforms: 2 side platforms
- Tracks: 2

Other information
- Status: Unattended
- Station code: K45
- Website: Official website

History
- Opened: 1 March 1903; 123 years ago

Passengers
- FY2019: 39 daily

Services
Preceding station	JR Hokkaido	Following station
Atsunai towards Takikawa	Nemuro Main Line Local	Shiranuka towards Nemuro
Location
- Location within Hokkaido Location within Japan

Ombetsu Station (音別駅, Ombetsu-eki) is a railway station located in the city of Kushiro, Hokkaidō, Japan. It is operated by JR Hokkaido. The station is also a freight depot for the Japan Freight Railway Company (JR Freight).

== Lines ==
The station is served by the Nemuro Main Line, and lies 128.8 km from the starting point of the line at Shintoku .

== Layout ==
Ombetsu Station has two opposed side platforms, connected by a level crossing. All trains normally use Platform 1, the main track, adjacent to the station building. Platform 2, serving the secondary track, is used only when trains need to pass. The station is unattended.

=== Platforms ===
1	■ Nemuro Main Line	for Kushiro for Obihiro
2	■ Nemuro Main Line	(used only when there are passing trains)

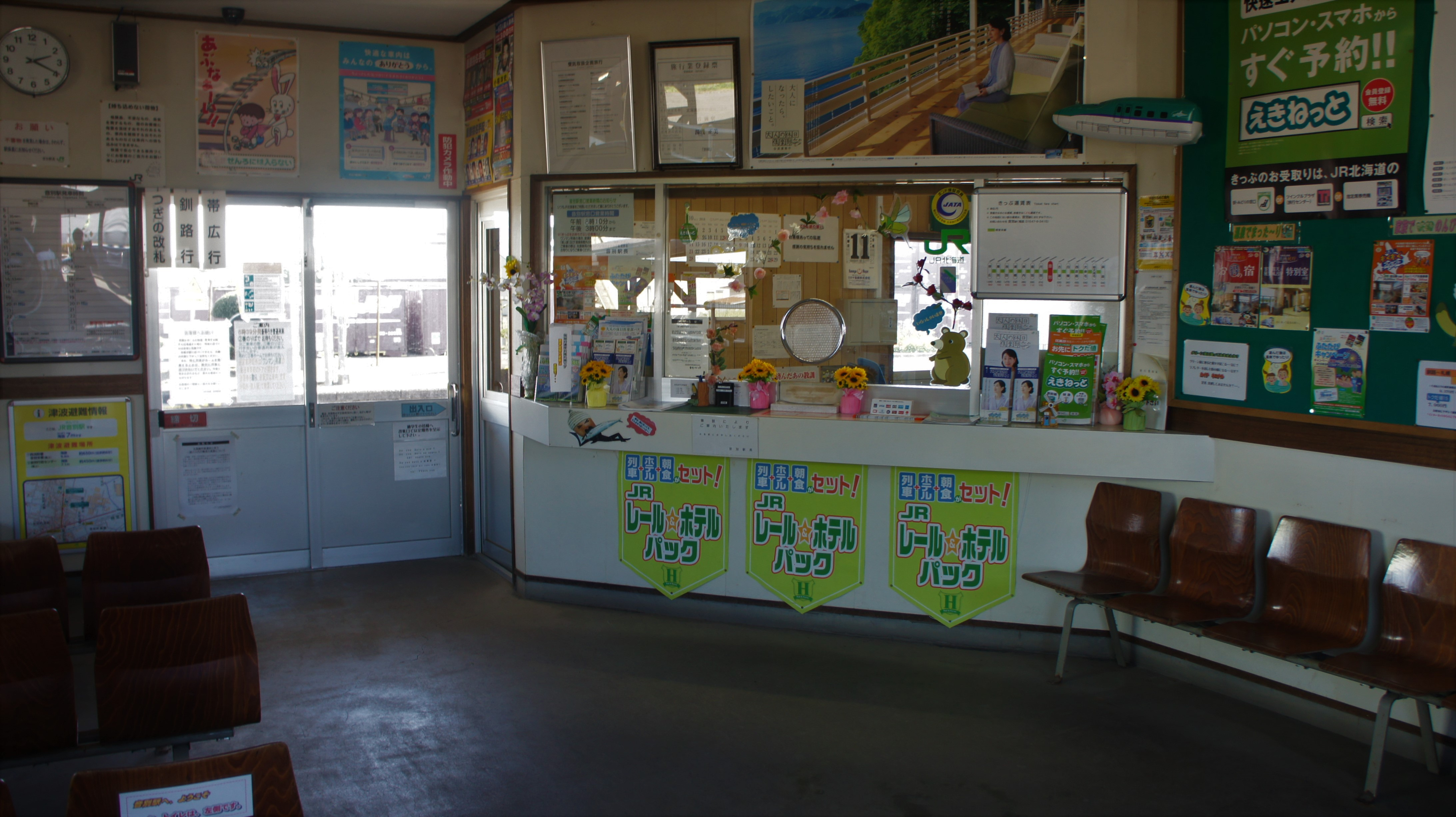
Waiting room

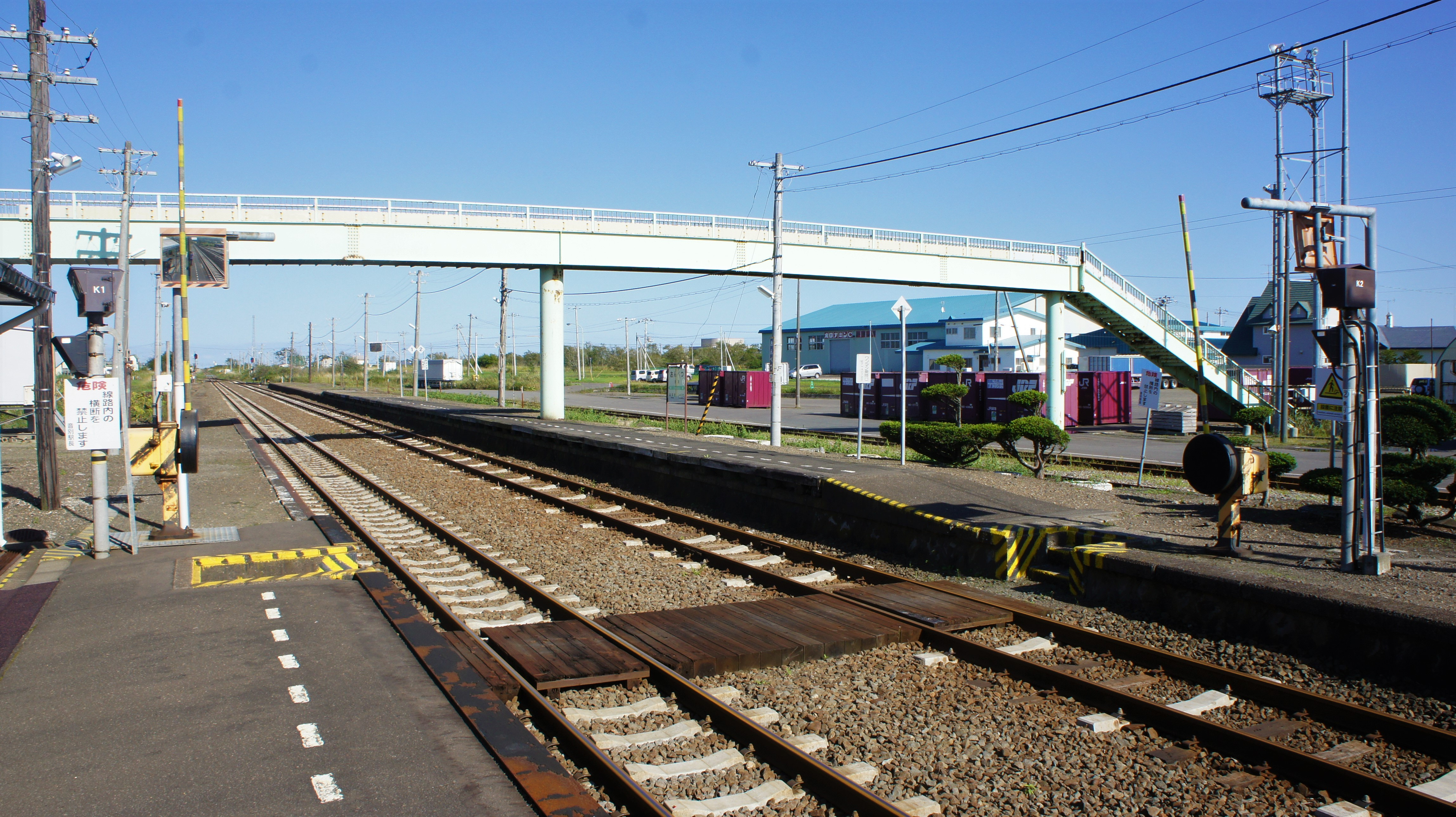
Platform with level crossing

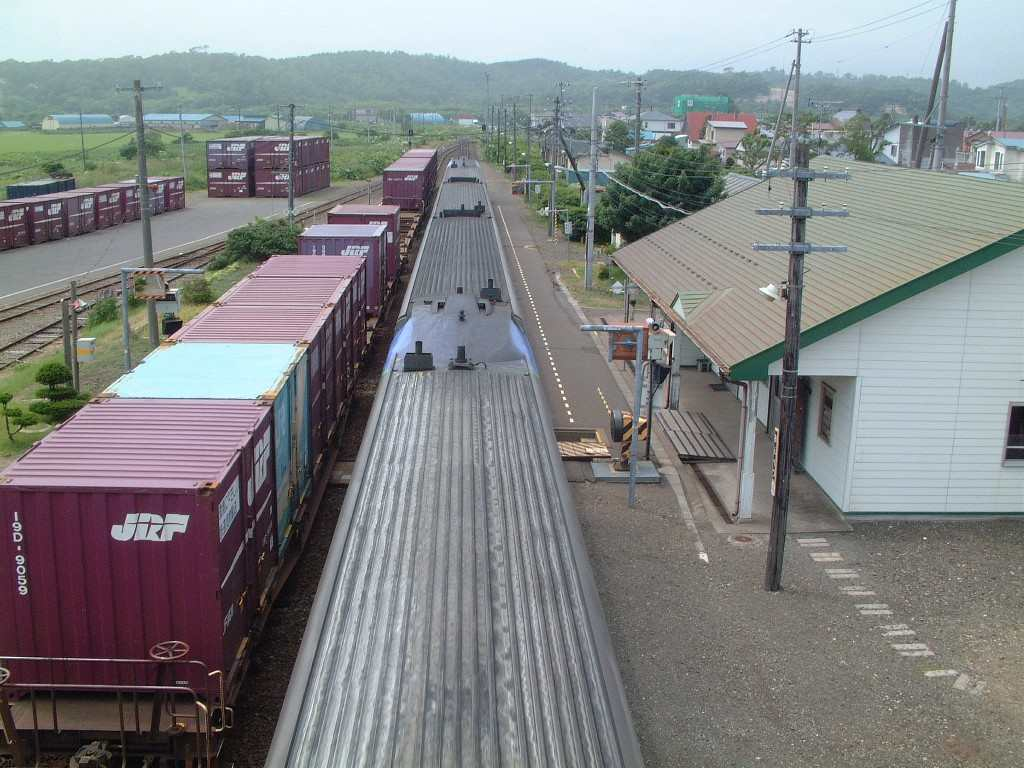
Freight train at Onbetsu Station

== History ==
The station opened on 1 March 1903 as a station on the Hokkaidō Kansetsu Tetsudō. It was transferred to the Ministry of Railways on 1 April 1905. The station was severely damaged in an airstrike on 14 July 1945. Freight operations were containerized in 1984. Following the privatization of the Japanese National Railways on 1 April 1987, the station came under the control of JR Hokkaido and the Japan Freight Railway Company.Onbetsu station became unstaffed in 2021.

== Passenger statistics ==
In fiscal 2019, the station was used by an average of 39 passengers daily.

== Surrounding area ==
- Hokkaido Prefectural Route 241 Main Onbetsu Station Line
- Japan National Route 38
- Kushiro City Hall Onbetsu Town Administrative Center (formerly Onbetsu Town Hall)
- Onbetsu Post Office
- Otsuka Pharmaceutical Factory Kushiro Plant

== See also ==
- List of railway stations in Japan
