= Katsuragaoka Chashi =

Historic site in Abashiri, Hokkaidō, Japan

- 桂ヶ岡砦跡 (Japanese)
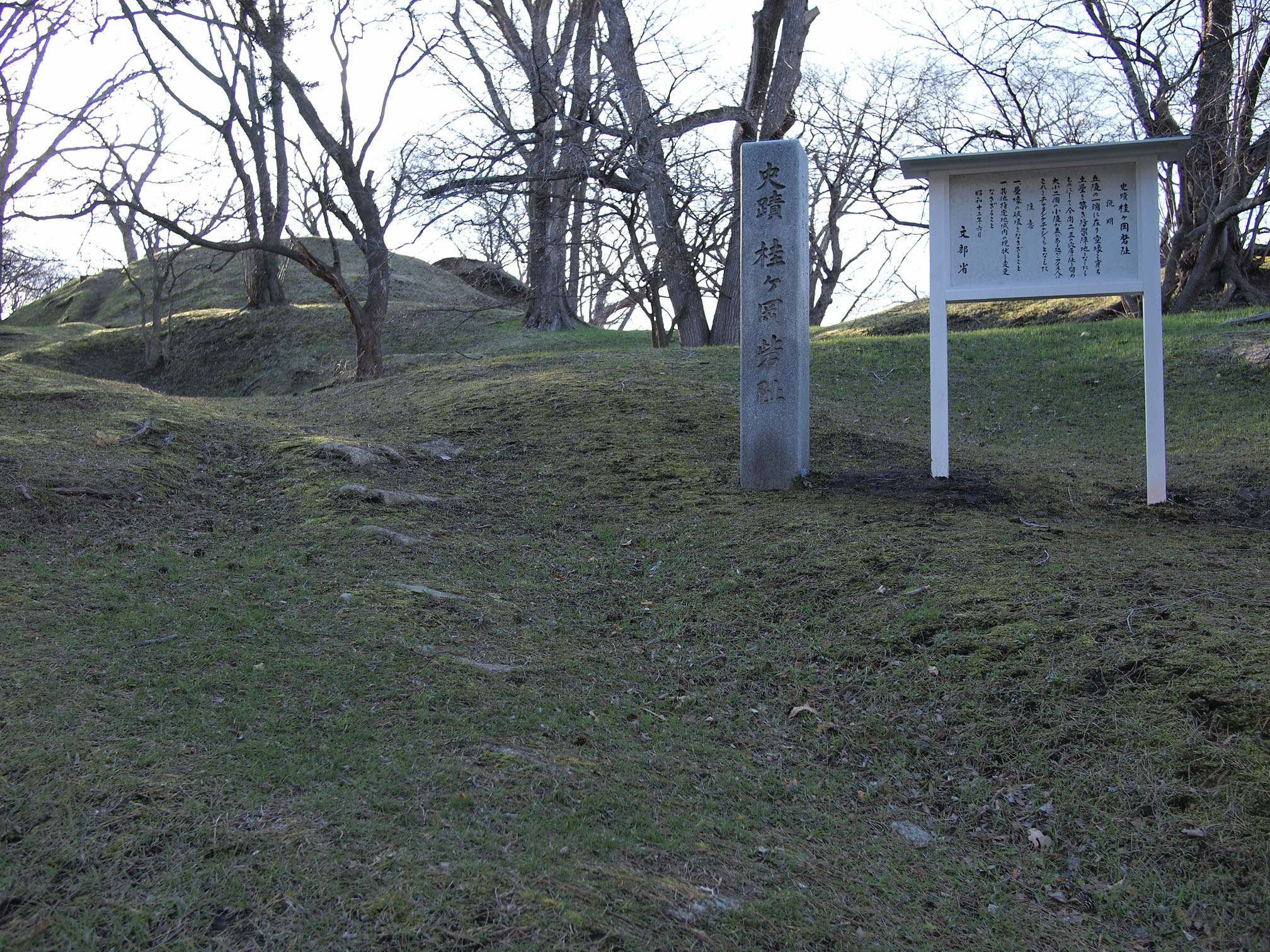
- Katsuragaoka Chashi

- Location within Hokkaido Location within Japan
- Interactive map of Katsuragaoka Chashi
- 44°1′4.5″N 144°16′11″E
- Type: Chashi
- Location: Abashiri, Hokkaidō, Japan

Site notes
- Public access: Yes (park)

The Katsuragaoka Chashi (桂ヶ岡砦跡, Katsuragaoka chashi ato) is remains of an Ainu chashi, located in the Katsuramachi neighborhood of the city of Abashiri, Hokkaido, Japan. The site was designated a National Historic Site in 1935.

== Overview ==
A Chashi (チャシ also 砦) is the Japanese term for the hilltop fortifications of the Ainu. The word is of Ainu origin, from チャシ (casi, /t͡ɕasi/), which means palisade or palisaded compound. Over 520 chashi have been identified in Hokkaidō, mostly in the eastern regions of the island; others are known from southern Sakhalin and the Kurils. Most date largely to the early seventeenth century and their construction may be related to increased competition for resources as a result of "intensification of trade" with the Japanese.

The Katsuragaoka Chashi is located on a hill facing the Sea of Okhotsk, and consists of two enclosures, one large and one small, with dry moats, and three cave dwellings. Katsuragaoka Chashi was built by taking advantage of the natural hilly terrain. It is 32.5 meters long and 8.4 meters wide, long from east-to-west, surrounded by a natural cliff to the north and double moats on the other three sides. However, rather than a fortification, it is said that its primary purpose was a location where the Ainu people met and conducted trade, rituals, and charanke (negotiations), and the name Charanke Chashi (チャランケ（談判）チャシ) has also been passed down. In the Ainu language, it was also called "Ishimesinaichashi" (a fort in a stream where dogs bark when they find bears) and "Rinnaisanoputsunchashi" (a fort at the mouth of the Abashiri River toward the sea).

The site is currently maintained as "Katsura-ga-oka Park." It is about a 15-minute walk from Abashiri Station on the JR Hokkaido Sekihoku Main Line.

== See also ==
- List of Historic Sites of Japan (Hokkaidō)
- List of Cultural Properties of Japan - archaeological materials (Hokkaidō)
- Abashiri City Folk Museum
- Yukuepira Chashi
