= Atsunai Station =

Railway station in Urahoro, Hokkaido, Japan

K42 Atsunai Station 厚内駅
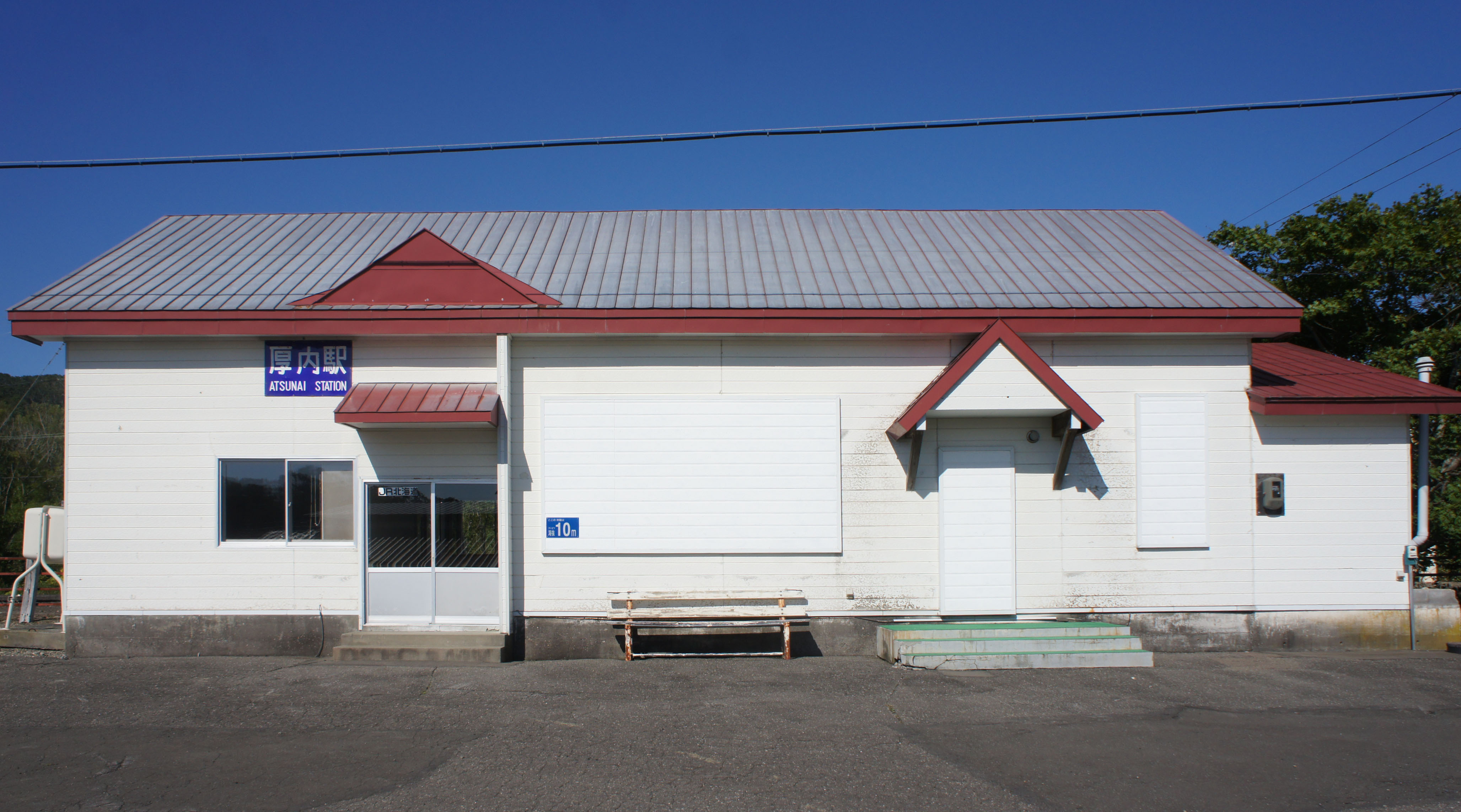
- Station building in September 2018

General information
- Location: Atsunai, Urahoro, Tokachi District, Hokkaido 089-5865; Japan
- Coordinates: 42°48′34.34″N 143°48′51.8″E
- System: regional rail
- Operator: JR Hokkaido
- Line: Nemuro Main Line
- Distance: 113.8km from Shintoku
- Platforms: 1 side + 1 island platforms
- Tracks: 3

Construction
- Structure type: At-grade
- Accessible: No

Other information
- Status: Unattended
- Station code: K42
- Website: Official website

History
- Opened: 25 December 1903; 122 years ago

Passengers
- FY2019: 39 daily

Services
Preceding station	JR Hokkaido	Following station
Urahoro towards Takikawa	Nemuro Main Line Local	Onbetsu towards Nemuro
Location
- Location within Hokkaido Location within Japan

Atsunai Station (厚内駅, Atsunai-eki) is a railway station located in the town of Urahoro, Tokachi District, Hokkaidō,. It is operated by JR Hokkaido.

== Lines ==
The station is served by the Nemuro Main Line, and lies 113.8 km from the starting point of the line at Shintoku .

== Layout ==
Atsunai Station has one side platform and one island platform, connected by an open footbridge. Most trains use Platform 1, next to the station building. The station is unattended.

=== Platforms ===
1, 2	■ Nemuro Main Line	for Kushiro
1, 3	■ Nemuro Main Line	for Obihiro and Shintoku

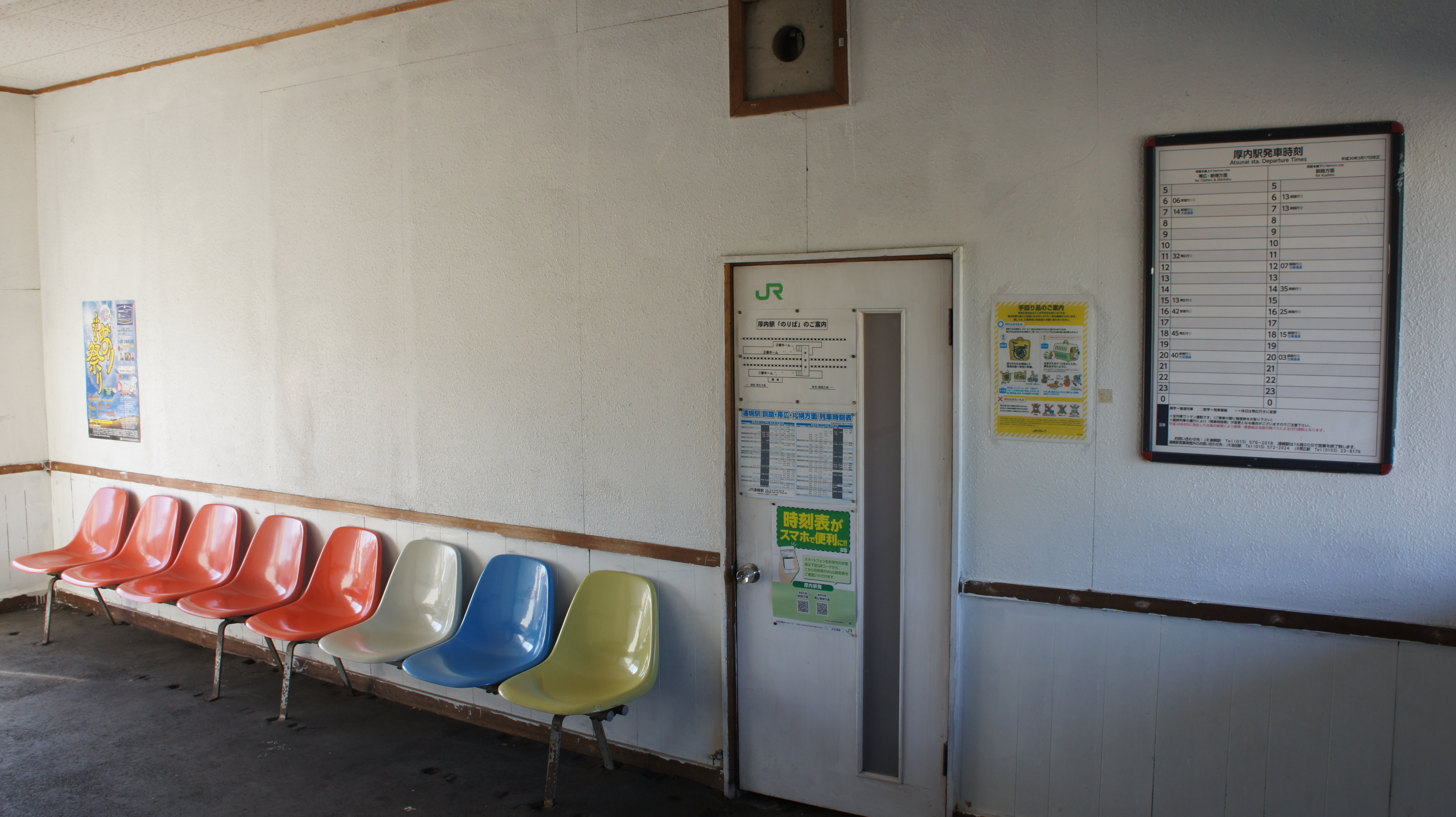
Waiting room

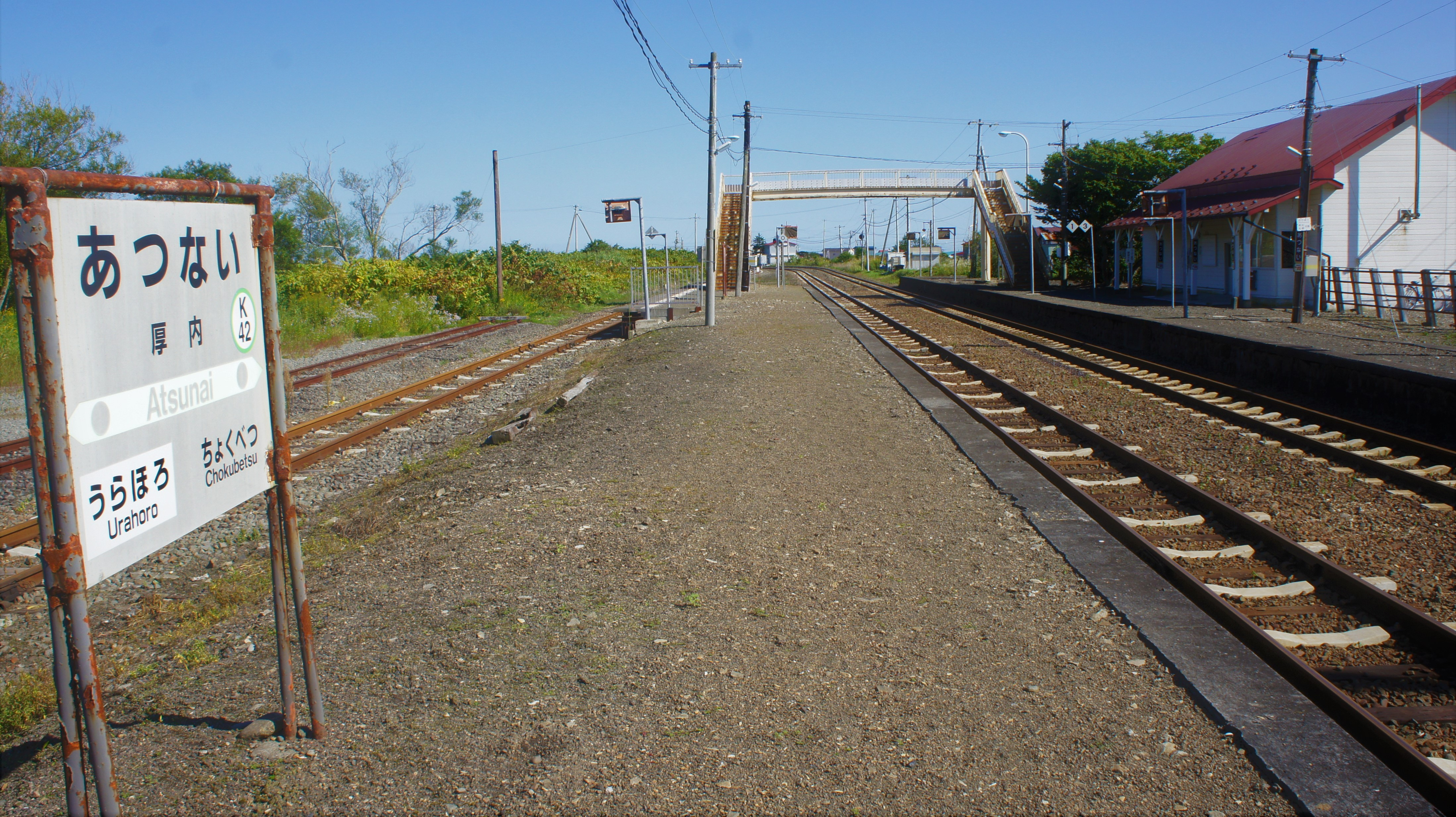
Platform

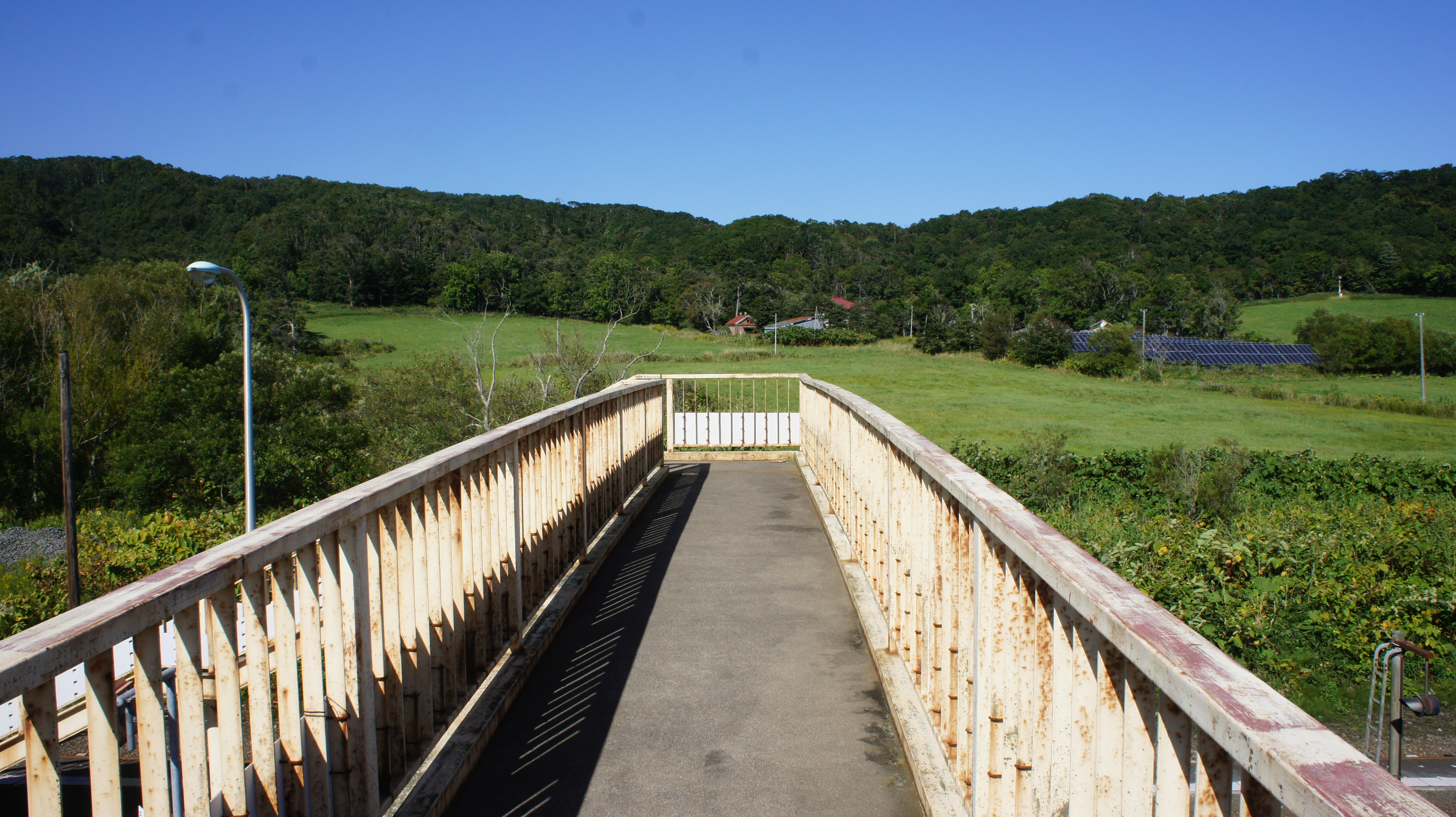
Footbridge

== History ==
The station opened on 25 December 1903 as a station on the Hokkaidō Kansetsu Tetsudō. It was transferred to the Ministry of Railways on 1 April 1905. Following the privatization of the Japanese National Railways on 1 April 1987, the station came under the control of JR Hokkaido.

=== Future plans ===
In June 2023, this station was selected to be among 42 stations on the JR Hokkaido network to be slated for abolition owing to low ridership.

== Passenger statistics ==
In fiscal 2024, the station was used by under 10 passengers daily.

== Surrounding area ==
The station is located in the hamlet of Atsunai.

- Otsu Fisheries Cooperative Association Atsunai Branch
- Atsunai Port

== See also ==
- List of railway stations in Japan
