= Yukuepira Chashi =

National Historic Site in Rikubetsu, Hokkaidō, Japan

- ユクエピラチャシ跡 (Japanese)
- Location within Hokkaido Location within Japan
- 43°27′52″N 143°44′09″E
- Type: Chashi
- Location: Rikubetsu, Hokkaidō, Japan

Site notes
- Owner: National Historic Site
- Public access: Yes

The site of Yukuepira Chashi (ユクエピラチャシ跡, Yukuepira-chashi ato) in Rikubetsu, Hokkaidō, Japan, was once occupied by the Ainu chashi of Yukuepira, one of the largest on the island. It has been designated a National Historic Site.

== Name ==
Yukuepira is derived from the Ainu yuk "deer", e "eat", and pira "cliff". The site also goes by the name of Kaneran Chashi (カネランチャシ).

== Overview ==
One of a number of chashi situated along the Toshibetsu River (利別川) and opposite a steep cliff, the site is defined by a large embankment. Skeletal remains from the fifteenth and sixteenth centuries of some 10,000 deer may be linked to trade in skins, and Yukuepira is understood to have functioned not only as a fort.

Investigation of the site from 2002 to 2004 has uncovered remains of a palisade, holes for posts, and a layer of ash. Artefacts of iron and bone have been recovered together with evidence for the diet, which included fish, nuts, and seeds. Earlier Jōmon and Zoku-Jōmon lithics and ceramics have also been found.

== See also ==
- List of Historic Sites of Japan (Hokkaidō)
- List of Cultural Properties of Japan - archaeological materials (Hokkaidō)
