= List of cultural properties of Japan – archaeological materials (Hokkaido) =

This list is of the cultural properties of Japan designated in the category of archaeological materials (考古資料, kōko shiryō) for the circuit of Hokkaidō.

== National Cultural Properties ==
As of 31 July 2019, twenty-two Important Cultural Properties (including one *National Treasure) have been designated, being of national significance; this number includes two Important Cultural Properties that were excavated in Hokkaidō and are now in the collection of Tokyo National Museum.

Property	Date	Municipality	Ownership	Comments	Image	Coordinates	Ref.
*Dogū excavated from the Chobonaino Site, Hakodate, Hokkaidō 土偶／北海道函館市著保内野遺跡出土 dogū Hokkaidō Hakodate-shi Chobonaino iseki shutsudo	Jōmon period	Hakodate	Hakodate City (kept at Hakodate Jōmon Culture Center)	known as Hollow Dogū; one of five National Treasure dogū, alongside Jōmon Venus, Masked Goddess, Jōmon Goddess, and Palms Together Dogū		41°55′40″N 140°56′42″E	
Clay mask, excavated from burial 310 at the Mamachi Site, Mamachi-machi, Chitose, Hokkaidō 土面／北海道千歳市真々地町ママチ遺跡第三一〇号土壙墓出土 do-men Hokkaidō Chitose-shi Mamachi-machi Mamachi iseki dai-san-ichi-rei-gō dokōbo shutsudo	Jōmon period	Ebetsu	Agency for Cultural Affairs (kept at Hokkaido Archaeological Operations Center)			43°03′37″N 141°29′40″E	
Animal-shaped clay object, excavated from the Bibi IV Site, Chitose, Hokkaidō 動物形土製品／北海道千歳市美々第四遺跡出土 dōbutsu-gata doseihin Hokkaidō Chitose-shi Bibi dai-yon iseki shutsudo	Jōmon period	Chitose	Chitose City			42°49′16″N 141°39′03″E	
Excavated artefacts from the pit graves at the Karinba ruins, Hokkaidō 北海道カリンバ遺跡墓坑出土品; Hokkaidō Karinba iseki hakaana shutsudo-hin	Jōmon period	Eniwa	Eniwa City (kept at Eniwa City Historical Museum)			42°54′33″N 141°35′59″E	
Excavated artefacts from the Kotan Onsen Site, Hokkaidō 北海道コタン温泉遺跡出土品; Hokkaidō Kotan-onsen iseki shutsudo-hin	Jōmon period	Yakumo	Yakumo Town (kept at Yakumo Town Museum)			42°15′16″N 140°16′06″E	
Excavated artefacts from the burial mounds at the Motoebetsu I Site, Hokkaidō 北海道元江別１遺跡土墳墓出土品; Hokkaidō Motoebetsu ichi-iseki dokōbo shutsudo-hin	Zoku-Jōmon period	Ebetsu	Agency for Cultural Affairs (kept at Ebetsu City Historical Museum)			43°06′49″N 141°32′53″E	
Excavated artefacts from the Ebetsubuto Site, Hokkaidō 北海道江別太遺跡出土品; Hokkaidō Ebetsubuto iseki shutsudo-hin	Zoku-Jōmon period	Ebetsu	Ebetsu City (kept at Ebetsu City Historical Museum)			43°06′49″N 141°32′53″E	
Coins excavated from the medieval remains of Shinori, Hokkaidō 北海道志海苔中世遺構出土銭; Hokkaidō Shinori chūsei ikō shutsudo zeni	Nanboku-chō period	Hakodate	Hakodate City (kept at Hakodate City Museum)	374,435 coins		41°45′21″N 140°42′53″E	
Excavated artefacts from the Matsunorikawa Hokugan Site, Hokkaidō 北海道松法川北岸遺跡出土品; Hokkaidō Matsunorikawa Hokugan iseki shutsudo-hin	Okhotsk culture	Rausu	Rausu Town (kept at Rausu Municipal Museum)			43°52′50″N 145°05′37″E	
Excavated artefacts from the Katsuyama Fortified Residence Site, Kaminokuni, Hokkaidō 北海道上之国勝山館跡出土品; Hokkaidō Kaminokuni Katsuyama-date ato shutsudo-hin	Muromachi to Momoyama period	Kaminokuni	Kaminokuni Town			41°48′04″N 140°07′17″E	
Excavated artefacts from the Funadomari Site, Hokkaidō 北海道船泊遺跡出土品; Hokkaidō Funadomari iseki shutsudo-hin	Jōmon period	Rebun	Rebun Town (kept at Rebun Municipal General Activity Center (礼文町町民総合活動センター))			45°17′59″N 141°02′47″E	
Excavated artefacts from the Yunosato IV Site, Hokkaidō 北海道湯の里４遺跡土壙出土品; Hokkaidō Yunosato yon-iseki dokō shutsudo-hin	Paleolithic	Shiriuchi	Shiriuchi Town (kept at Shiriuchi Local Museum (知内町郷土館))			41°35′54″N 140°25′08″E	
Excavated artefacts from the Shirataki Sites, Hokkaidō 北海道白滝遺跡群出土品; Hokkaidō Shirataki iseki-gun shutsudo-hin	Paleolithic	Engaru	Engaru Town (kept at Shirataki Learning Center (白滝教育センター))			43°53′11″N 143°11′32″E	
Excavated artefacts from the Yachiyo A Site, Hokkaidō 北海道八千代Ａ遺跡出土品; Hokkaidō Yachiyo A-iseki shutsudo-hin	early Jōmon period	Obihiro	Obihiro City (kept at Obihiro Centennial City Museum)			42°54′25″N 143°11′11″E	
Excavated artefacts from the Bibi VIII Site, Hokkaidō 北海道美々８遺跡出土品; Hokkaidō Bibi hachi-iseki shutsudo-hin	Satsumon to Ainu	Ebetsu	Hokkaidō (kept at Hokkaido Archaeological Operations Center)			43°03′37″N 141°29′40″E	
Excavated artefacts from the Pirika I Site, Hokkaidō 北海道美利河１遺跡出土品; Hokkaidō Pirika ichi-iseki shutsudo-hin	Paleolithic	Imakane	Imakane Town (kept at Pirika Paleolithic Culture Museum (ピリカ旧石器文化館))			42°28′38″N 140°12′07″E	
Excavated artefacts from the Toyohara IV Site, Hokkaidō 北海道豊原４遺跡土坑出土品; Hokkaidō Toyohara yon-iseki dokō shutsudo-hin	early Jōmon period	Hakodate	Hakodate City (kept at Hakodate Jōmon Culture Center)			41°46′07″N 140°43′45″E	
Excavated artefacts from the Menashidomari Site, Hokkaidō 北海道目梨泊遺跡出土品; Hokkaidō Menashidomari iseki shutsudo-hin	Okhotsk culture	Esashi	Esashi Town (kept at Okhotsk Museum Esashi)			44°56′21″N 142°34′03″E	
Excavated artefacts from the Usu-moshiri Site, Hokkaidō 北海道有珠モシリ遺跡出土品; Hokkaidō Usu-moshiri iseki shutsudo-hin	Jōmon period	Date	Date City			42°28′17″N 140°51′55″E	
Excavated artefacts from the Usu-moshiri Site, Hokkaidō 北海道有珠モシリ遺跡出土品; Hokkaidō Usu-moshiri iseki shutsudo-hin	Zoku-Jōmon period	Date	Agency for Cultural Affairs			42°28′17″N 140°51′55″E	
Dogū 土偶 dogū	Jōmon period	Tōkyō	National Institutes for Cultural Heritage (kept at Tokyo National Museum)	excavated in Muroran		35°43′12″N 139°46′32″E	
Spouted earthenware with human figure design 人形装飾付異形注口土器 hito-gata sōshoku tsuki ikei chūkō doki	Jōmon period	Tōkyō	National Institutes for Cultural Heritage (kept at Tokyo National Museum)	excavated at Moheji (茂辺地) in Hokuto, together with fragments of a number of other vessels decorated with figures of human and non-human animals		35°43′12″N 139°46′32″E	

== Prefectural Cultural Properties ==
As of 5 September 2019, twenty-five properties have been designated as being of prefectural importance.

Property	Date	Municipality	Ownership	Comments	Image	Coordinates	Ref.
Dogū, excavated from the Ōasa III Site 大麻３遺跡出土の土偶; Ōasa san-iseki shutsudo no dogū	Jōmon period	Ebetsu	Ebetsu City (kept at Ebetsu City Historical Museum)	two figurines		43°06′49″N 141°32′53″E	
Artefacts excavated from the Sapporo City K-446 Site 札幌市Ｋ-446遺跡出土の遺物; Sapporo-shi Kē yonhyakyon-iseki shutsudo no ibutsu	Satsumon culture	Sapporo	Sapporo Buried Cultural Property Center			43°01′48″N 141°20′25″E	
Lithics excavated at Tarukishi 樽岸出土の石器; Tarukishi shutsudo no sekki	Paleolithic	Hakodate	Hakodate City Museum			41°45′21″N 140°42′53″E	
Ceramic vessel with pointed base excavated in Todohokke 椴法華出土の尖底土器; Todohokke shutsudo no sentei doki	early Jōmon period	Hakodate	Hakodate City (kept at Hakodate City Museum)			41°45′21″N 140°42′53″E	
Dogū in the shape of an animal excavated from the Hinohama Site 日ノ浜遺跡出土の動物土偶; Hinohama iseki shutsudo no dōbutsu dogū	Jōmon period	Hakodate	Hakodate City (kept at Hakodate City Museum)			41°45′21″N 140°42′53″E	
Artefacts excavated from the Sumiyoshi-chō Site 住吉町遺跡出土の遺物; Sumiyoshi-chō iseki shutsudo no ibutsu doki	early Jōmon period	Hakodate	Hakodate City (kept at Hakodate City Museum)			41°45′21″N 140°42′53″E	
Artefacts excavated from the Saibesawa Site サイベ沢遺跡出土の遺物; Saibesawa iseki shutsudo no ibutsu doki	early to mid-Jōmon period	Hakodate	Hakodate City (kept at Hakodate City Museum)			41°45′21″N 140°42′53″E	
Artefacts excavated from the site of Yafurai Fortified Residence 矢不来館跡出土品; Yafurai-date ato shutsudo-hin	late C15/early C16	Hokuto	Hokuto City (kept at Hokuto City Hometown Museum)			41°53′01″N 140°38′38″E	
Red ceramic vessel with spout 赤彩注口土器 sekisai chūkō doki	Jōmon period	Yakumo	Yakumo Town (kept at Yakumo Town Museum)	from the Nodaoi I Site (野田生１遺跡)		42°15′16″N 140°16′06″E	
Excavated artefacts from the Aonae Site 青苗遺跡出土品; Aonae iseki shutsudo-hin	Satsumon culture	Okushiri	Okushiri Town (kept at Inaho Fureai Kenshū Center (稲穂ふれあい研修センター))			42°14′24″N 139°33′05″E	
Artefacts excavated from the Minamikawa Site 南川遺跡出土の遺物; Minamikawa iseki shutsudo no ibutsu	Zoku-Jōmon period	Setana	Setana Town (kept at Setana Town Museum (せたな町郷土館))			42°27′11″N 139°51′19″E	
Artefacts excavated from the Higashiyama Cylindrical Pottery Culture Site 岩内東山円筒土器文化遺跡出土の遺物; Iwanai Higashiyama entō-doki bunka iseki shutsudo no ibutsu	early to mid-Jōmon period	Iwanai	Iwanai Town (kept at Iwanai Town Museum (岩内町郷土館))			42°58′50″N 140°30′18″E	
Artefacts excavated from the Amauchiyama Site 天内山遺跡出土の遺物; Amauchiyama iseki shutsudo no ibutsu	Satsumon culture	Yoichi	Yoichi Fisheries Museum (余市水産博物館)			43°11′48″N 140°47′13″E	
Artefacts excavated from the Takisato Sites 滝里遺跡群出土遺物; Takisato iseki-gun shutsudo ibutsu	Zoku-Jōmon period	Ashibetsu	Ashibetsu City (kept at Hoshi-no-Furusato Centennial Museum (星の降る里百年記念館))	5,675 items		43°31′33″N 142°11′20″E	
Artefacts excavated from the Poronaipo Site ポロナイポ遺跡出土遺物; Poronaipo iseki shutsudo ibutsu	Satsumon culture	Esashi	Esashi Town Board of Education (kept at Okhotsk Museum Esashi)			44°56′21″N 142°34′03″E	
Artefacts excavated from the Matawakka Shell Mound 亦稚貝塚出土の遺物; Matawakka kaizuka shutsudo no ibutsu	Okhotsk culture	Rishiri	Rishiri Town Board of Education (kept at Rishiri Town Museum (利尻町立博物館))			44°56′21″N 142°34′03″E	
Figurines of girls and animals made from teeth, excavated on Rebun Island 礼文島出土の歯牙製女性像及び動物像; Rebun-tō shutsudo no shiga-sei josei zō oyobi dōbutsu zō	Okhotsk culture	Rebun	Chōshō-ji (長昌寺))	from the sperm whale		45°26′22″N 141°02′16″E	
Lithics excavate from the Horokagawa Site 幌加川遺跡出土の石器群; Horokagawa iseki shutsudo no sekki-gun	Paleolithic	Engaru	Engaru Town Museum (遠軽町先史資料館)			43°53′12″N 143°11′34″E	
Artefacts excavated from the Shuenshūtei Tombs of Shari 斜里朱円周堤墓群出土遺物; Shari Shuenshūtei bogun shutsudo ibutsu	Late Jōmon period	Shari	Shari Town (kept at Shiretoko Museum)			43°54′46″N 144°40′22″E	
Artefacts excavated from the Memanbetsu Sekijinzoku Site 女満別石刃鏃遺跡出土の遺物; Memanbetsu Sekijinzoku iseki shutsudo no ibutsu	early Jōmon period	Ōzora	Ōzora Town Board of Education			43°54′40″N 144°10′21″E	
Excavated artefacts from Irie Shell Mound 入江貝塚出土品; Irie kaizuka shutsudo-hin	mid- to Late-Jōmon period	Tōyako	Tōyako			42°32′43″N 140°46′17″E	
Artefacts excvated from the Shizunai Gotenyama Burial Cluster 静内御殿山墳墓群出土の遺物; Shizunai Gotenyama funbo-gun shutsudo no ibutsu	Jōmon period	Shinhidaka	Shinhidaka Town Board of Education (kept at Shinhidaka Town Museum, Shizunai (新ひだか町静内郷土館))			42°20′38″N 142°21′30″E	
Excavated artefacts from the Nibutani Sites 二風谷遺跡群出土品; Nibutani iseki-gun shutsudo-hin	1500–1700	Biratori	Nibutani Town (kept at Nibutani Ainu Culture Museum)			42°38′15″N 142°09′21″E	
Artefacts excavated from the Taiki Site 大樹遺跡出土の遺物; Taiki iseki shutsudo no ibutsu	early Jōmon period	Taiki	Taiki Town Board of Education (kept at Taiki Town Library (大樹町図書館))			42°29′49″N 143°16′59″E	
Dogū and grave goods excavated from the Hatsutaushi 20 Site 初田牛２０遺跡出土の土偶及び墓坑出土遺物; Hatsutaushi nijū-iseki shutsudo no dogū oyobi bokō shutsudo ibutsu	Late Jōmon period	Nemuro	Nemuro City (kept at Nemuro City Museum of History and Nature (根室市歴史と自然の資料館))			43°17′20″N 145°35′25″E	

== See also ==
- Cultural Properties of Japan
- List of National Treasures of Japan (archaeological materials)
- List of Historic Sites of Japan (Hokkaidō)
- List of Cultural Properties of Japan - historical materials (Hokkaidō)
- List of Cultural Properties of Japan - paintings (Hokkaidō)
- Hokkaido Museum
