= Ebetsu Kofun Cluster =

Satsumon culture burial mounds in Japan

- 江別古墳群 (Japanese)
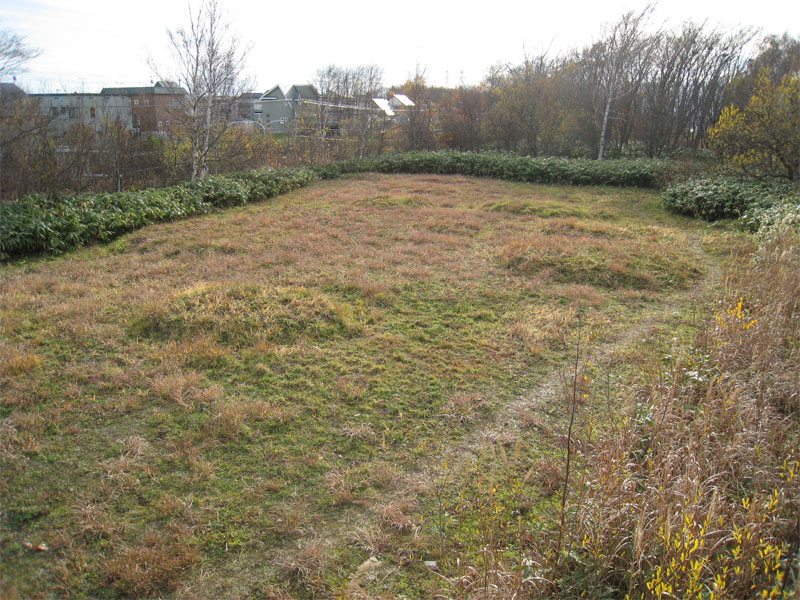
- Ebetsu Kofun Cluster

- Ebetsu Kofun Cluster Ebetsu Kofun Cluster (Japan)
- 43°07′01″N 141°30′57″E
- Type: Kofun cluster
- Cultures: Satsumon culture
- Location: Ebetsu, Hokkaidō, Japan

History
- Built: 8th to 9th century AD
- National Historic Site of Japan

The Ebetsu Kofun Cluster (江別古墳群, Ebetsu kofun-gun) is a group of Satsumon culture burial mounds in the Motoebetsu neighbourhood of the city of Ebetsu, Hokkaidō, Japan. Dating from the late eighth and early ninth century, and the northernmost kofun known to date, eighteen were jointly designated a National Historic Site in 1998.

== Overview ==
The site is located at the northwest end of the Nopporo Hills that rise from the Ishikari Plain, at an altitude of 18 metres (59 ft), on the right bank of what was once the Seta Toyohira River, which empties into the Ishikari. It was discovered in 1931 by an elementary school teacher Gotō Juichi, the term Gotō Site (後藤遺跡) is also used to refer not only to this series of "Hokkaidō-style kofun" (「北海道式古墳」), as he called them, but also to the nearby Jōmon and Zoku-Jōmon remains. The 1931 archaeological excavations uncovered sixteen burials, grave goods including blades (kenugigata-tō, warabite-tō, shō-tō, and tōsu), magatama, earrings, and earthenware spindle whorls. Subsequently, the burial mounds were indistinct.

In 1980 the site was investigated again in connection with a highway construction project. Of the burials previously excavated, except for Mound 15, only the existence of the surrounding ditches could be confirmed, with all trace of the central arrangements for burial lost. In total, twenty-one burials were recorded, including those previously excavated; while Mounds 3, 4, and 5 were lost to construction of the Ebetsu Interchange on Hokkaidō Highway 110, the remaining eighteen have since been jointly designated a Historic Site. The surrounding ditches, with a depth of 50 centimetres (20 in) or more, take the shape of a circle, oval, or horseshoe, and include large (8–10 metres (26–33 ft) in diameter), medium (5–7 metres (16–23 ft)), and small (up to 5 metres (16 ft)) examples, those of a medium size being most numerous. As documented by the original excavator, the low circular burial mounds thereby enclosed had a diameter of 3–10 metres (9.8–32.8 ft) and rose to a height of 0.3–1 metre (1 ft 0 in – 3 ft 3 in). The original heights are likely higher, but have since been eroded by wind and rain.

In the centre of Mound 15, 7 by 5 metres (23 ft × 16 ft) and surrounded by a horseshoe-shaped ditch, is a shallow depression, 211 by 74 centimetres (83 in × 29 in) and with a depth of 12 centimetres (4.7 in), which, from the impressions around the edges, appears to have been once occupied by a wooden casket. Artefacts recovered from the various surrounding ditches include Haji ware, Sue ware, iron arrowheads, plough tips, and earthen spindle whorls, and, from Mound 15, a red Sue ware cup with a pair of handles and a Haji ware vessel black inside, from the ditch, and from the central area, teeth, the remains of a skull, and an iron artefact that is perhaps part of the hilt of a warabite-tō. The circular ditch of Mound 1 is 10 metres (33 ft) in diameter and 2 metres (6 ft 7 in) deep; though disturbed and only the location of the mound is known, part of an iron sword was found from the central area, while an iron plough tip was found in the surrounding ditch. Based on the artifacts discovered, the Ebetsu Tomb Group is believed to have been built between the 7th and 9th centuries.

== Significance ==
During the Kofun period, burial mound construction was concentrated in the Kinai region, extending from southern Kyushu to southern Tōhoku. Kofun also exist in northern Tōhoku and Hokkaidō; however, these do not date to the Kofun period (3rd-6th centuries). Rather, they were constructed during the Asuka, Nara, and early Heian periods, during the Ritsuryō period, when the campaign to conquer the Emishi was in full swing. Though the northernmost, those of the Ebetsu Kofun Cluster are not the only kofun in Hokkaidō - other examples include those at the Machimura Farm Site I (町村農場1遺跡), also in Ebetsu, Sapporo City K39 Site (札幌市K39遺跡) and a site in Kita-ku (北区北7条西6丁目) in Sapporo, Nishi-Shimamatsu V Site (西島松5遺跡) and Kashiwagi-Higashi Site (柏木東遺跡) (also known as the Moizari Kofun Cluster (茂漁古墳群)) in Eniwa, Yukanboshi C15 Site (ユカンボシC15遺跡) and Yukanboshi C1 Site (ユカンボシC1遺跡) in Chitose, all eight sites in the Ishikari River System, and perhaps also the Kankan II Site in Biratori.

Nevertheless, both in its form, and in the nature and origin of many of its grave goods, the cluster attests to cultural exchange with Honshū and the continuation and influence of the terminal-phase kofun known from Tōhoku well beyond the end of the Kofun period and into the age of the Ritsuryō national state, and at the time more locally of the Satsumon culture. The structure of the mounds is similar to that of late Kofun tombs distributed in the northern Tōhoku region, and artifacts excavated from the tomb include Sue ware, iron arrowheads, knives, and spade tips, which are thought to have been brought from Honshū. There are two theories about the burial subject: one is that they were influential people from Hokkaidō who had connections with northern Tōhoku, and the other is that they were immigrants from the Tōhoku region.

== See also ==
- List of Historic Sites of Japan (Hokkaidō)
- Hokkaido Archaeological Operations Center
- Ebetsu City Historical Museum
- Okhotsk culture
- Ishikari River
