= Rausu Municipal Museum =

Museum in Rausu, Hokkaido, Japan

- 羅臼町郷土資料館
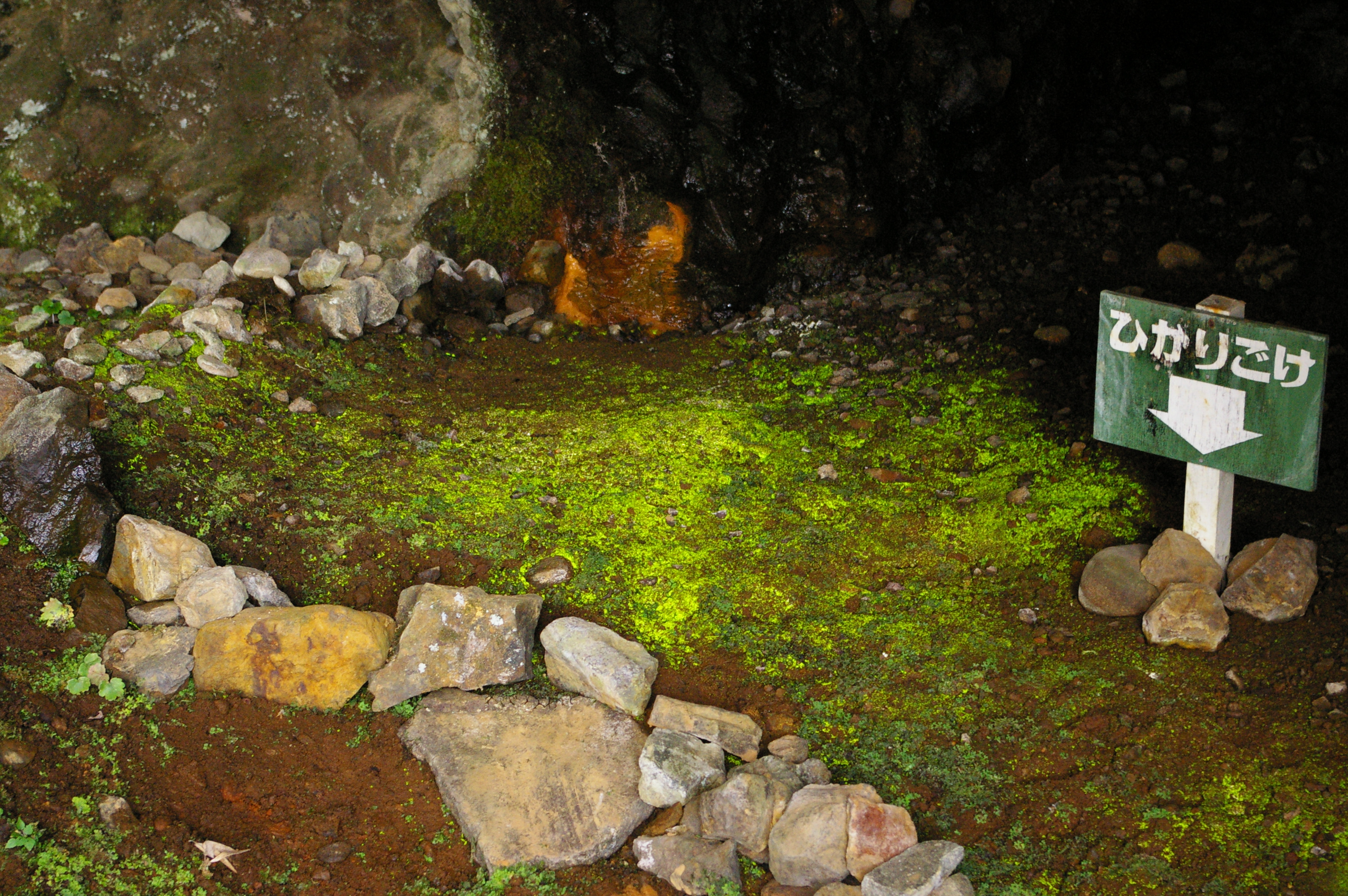
- Rausu luminous moss (Makkausu Cave)

General information
- Location: 307 Minehama-chō, Rausu, Hokkaidō, Japan
- Coordinates: 43°53′06″N 145°05′34″E
- Opened: 26 December 2011

Website
- Official website

Rausu Municipal Museum (Japanese: 羅臼町郷土資料館, Hepburn: Rausu-chō Kyōdo Shiryōkan) opened in Rausu, Hokkaidō, Japan in 2011. The museum is housed in the former Uebetsu Elementary and Junior High School building. The display is organized in accordance with six main themes: archaeological materials relating to the Jōmon, Zoku-Jōmon, Okhotsk, Tobinitai (トビニタイ文化), and Satsumon cultures; artefacts from the Matsunorikawa Hokugan Site (Okhotsk culture) that have been designated an Important Cultural Property; Rausu's luminous moss, a Prefectural Natural Monument; the Middle Ages and early modern period (the Wajin and Ainu, chashi, etc.); local industries and life, with an emphasis on fishing; and the wildlife of Shiretoko, a UNESCO World Heritage Site, including the white-tailed eagle, Blakiston's fish owl, and whales.

== See also ==
- List of Cultural Properties of Japan - archaeological materials (Hokkaidō)
- List of Natural Monuments of Japan (Hokkaidō)
- List of Historic Sites of Japan (Hokkaidō)
- Hokkaido Museum
- Shiretoko Museum
- Shiretoko National Park
