= Moyoro Shell Mound =

Moyoro Shell Midden
- モヨロ貝塚 (Japanese)
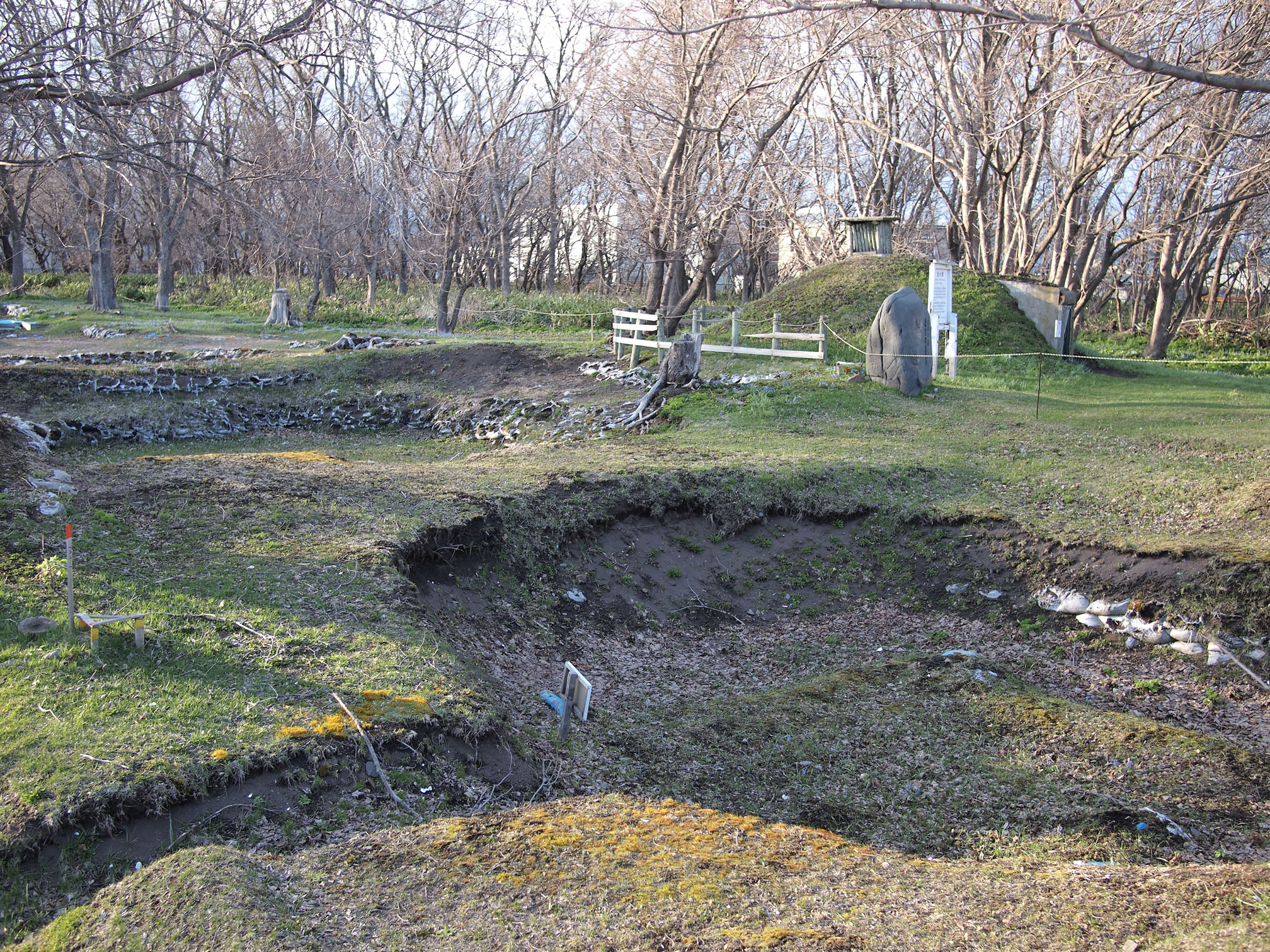
- Moyoro Shell Midden

- Moyoro Shell Midden Moyoro Shell Mound (Japan)
- Interactive map of Moyoro Shell Midden
- 44°1′30.0″N 144°16′3.7″E
- Type: shell midden
- Periods: Zoku-Jōmon - Okhotsk
- Location: Abashiri, Japan
- Region: Hokkaido

Site notes
- Public access: Yes (no facilities at site)
- Website: Official website

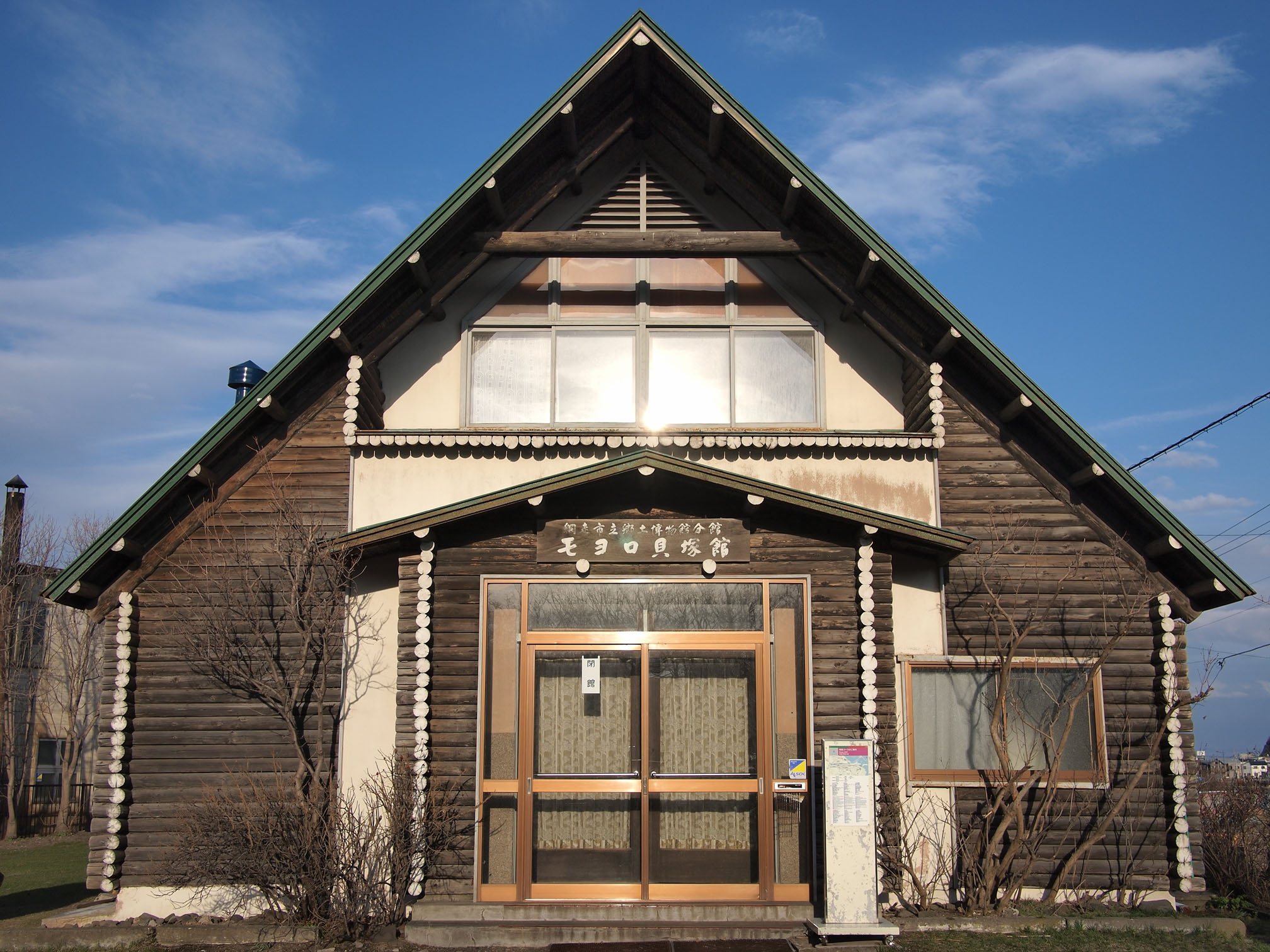
Moyoro Shell Midden Museum

The Moyoro Shell Midden (モヨロ貝塚, Moyoro kaizuka) is an archaeological site in the Kita 1-jo and Kita 3-jo Higashi 2-chome neighborhood of the city of Abashiri, Hokkaido, Japan with an Okhotsk culture shell midden. The site was designated a National Historic Site in 1936. Its name is also written in kanji as "最寄貝塚".

== Overview ==
Around the turn of first millennium, the coasts of Hokkaido were inhabited by the Zoku-Jōmon people, who were later supplanted by the Satsumon and Okhotsk peoples. The middens associated with their settlements contain bone, botanical material, mollusc shells, sherds, lithics, and other artifacts and ecofacts associated with the now-vanished inhabitants, and these features provide a useful source of insight into the diets and habits of society at the time.

The Moyoro Shell Mound is located on the north bank of the Abashiri River estuary, on a sand dune plateau five meters above the present sea level. Chronologically, buildings were built from a period that parallels the late Jōmon period in mainland Japan, and remained inhabited even after the inhabitants had changed to the Okhotsk cultural group. The inhabitants lived in pit dwellings, and the dead were buried in the shell mound. The midden was discovered by Yonemura Kiyoe, an amateur archaeologist from Aomori Prefecture, who visited Abashiri in 1913 and reported it to the academic community. Having learned from the pottery he discovered that there was a culture different from both the Jōmon and Ainu cultures, Yonemura decided to live in Abashiri and opened the Yonemura Barber Shop, while also working on investigating and researching the ruins. Artifacts recovered from the midden included the bones of marine animals and brown bears, which were carefully arranged. Many human bones buried in a flexed position were found in the shell mound. Excavated items included bone and horn implements, pottery, and stone implements, as well as iron swords (straight swords, fern-shaped swords, tweezer-shaped swords, etc.) and spears that are thought to have been made in Honshu, and bronze bells that are thought to have been brought from the Asian continent. Carvings of whales, dolphins, and bears can be seen on the pottery and bone and horn implements. There are statues of animals such as bears made from tusks, including a beautifully sculpted female statue made from tusks. Based on the proportion of tools, it is assumed that the focus of the settlement was on hunting marine animals.

In 1936, the Kitami Local History Museum (now the Abashiri City Local History Museum) was built to preserve and exhibit the remains. The Moyoro Shell Mound was designated a National Historic Site on December 16 of the same year. At the time of the historic site designation, 28 building remains were confirmed. These were divided into two groups: No. 1 to No. 14, which belong to the Okhotsk culture in the southeast, and No. 15 to No. 27, which are considered to be from the Zoku-Jōmon period in the northwest. The number has now decreased to about 20, as in 1941 and 1942 parts of the ruins were destroyed for the construction of naval facilities. After the war, a large-scale survey was carried out from 1947 to 1951. In more recent excavations from 1989, about 80 graves were found densely packed together, and seeds of many cultivated plants, including barley, were also found. In 2003 and 2004, many artifacts, including an earthen bear statue, were found.

The name of this shell mound was given by Yonemura Kiyoe in 1918 because the Ainu people at that time called it Moyoro Kotan. Moyoro means "inside or place of an inlet" in the Ainu language.

== See also ==
- List of Historic Sites of Japan (Hokkaidō)
