= Sapporo Buried Cultural Property Center =

Archaeology museum in Sapporo, Japan

- 札幌市埋蔵文化財センター
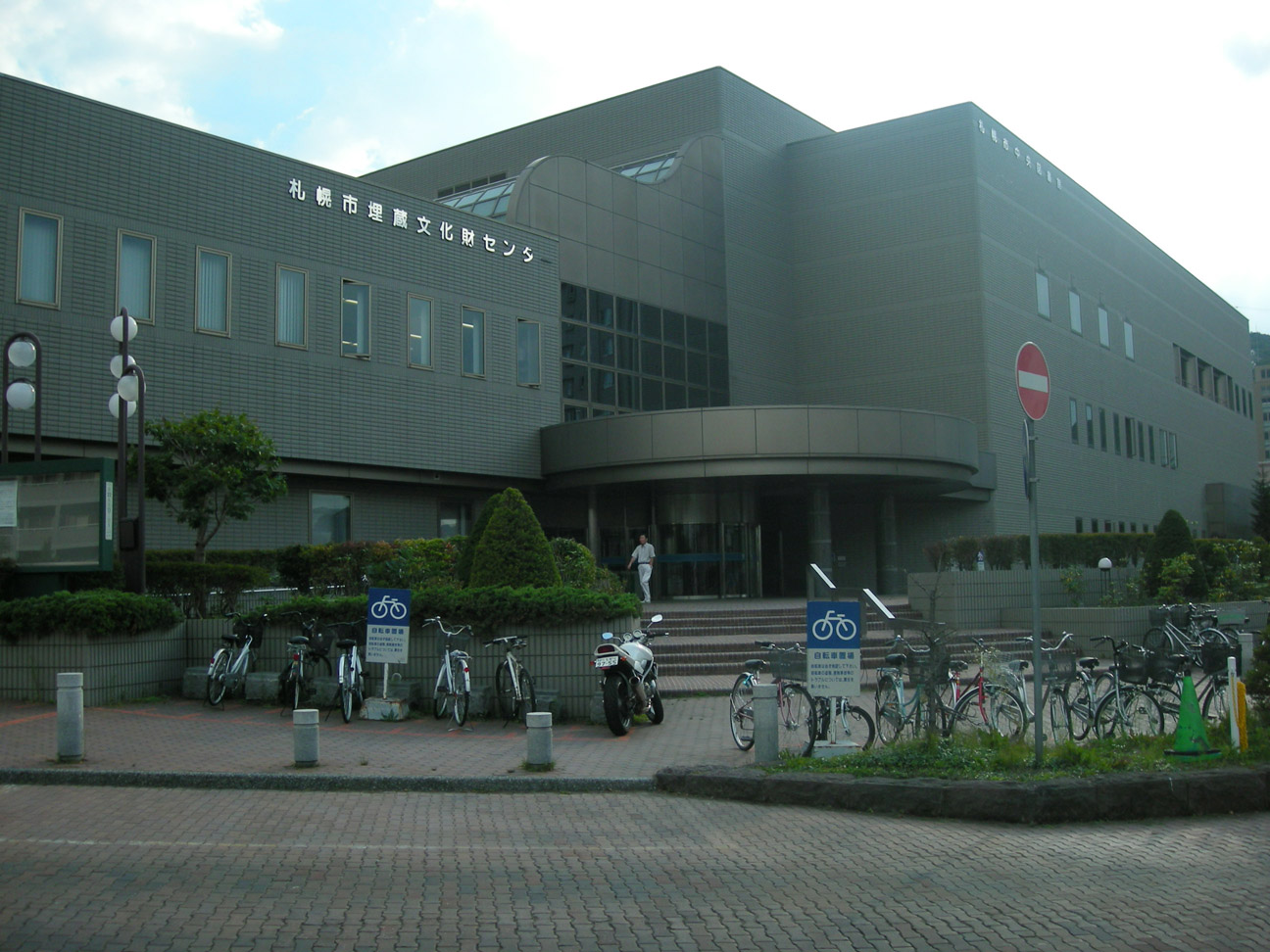
- Interactive map of the Sapporo Buried Cultural Property Center area

General information
- Location: 13-1-1 Minami, 22 Jōnishi, Chūō-ku, Sapporo, Hokkaidō, Japan
- Coordinates: 43°01′48″N 141°20′25″E
- Opened: March 1991

Website
- Official website

Sapporo Buried Cultural Property Center (札幌市埋蔵文化財センター, Sapporo Maizō Bunkazai Sentā) opened in Sapporo, Hokkaidō, Japan in 1991. Its aim is to research, collect, provide expertise on the preservation of, and display the city's buried cultural properties. The collection includes Jōmon artefacts as well as those of the Satsumon culture excavated from the Sapporo City K-446 Site that have been designated a Prefectural Tangible Cultural Property.

== See also ==
- Hokkaido Archaeological Operations Center
- Hokkaido Museum
- List of Cultural Properties of Japan - archaeological materials (Hokkaidō)
- List of Cultural Properties of Japan - historical materials (Hokkaidō)
- List of Historic Sites of Japan (Hokkaidō)
