= Eniwa City Historical Museum =

- 恵庭市郷土資料館
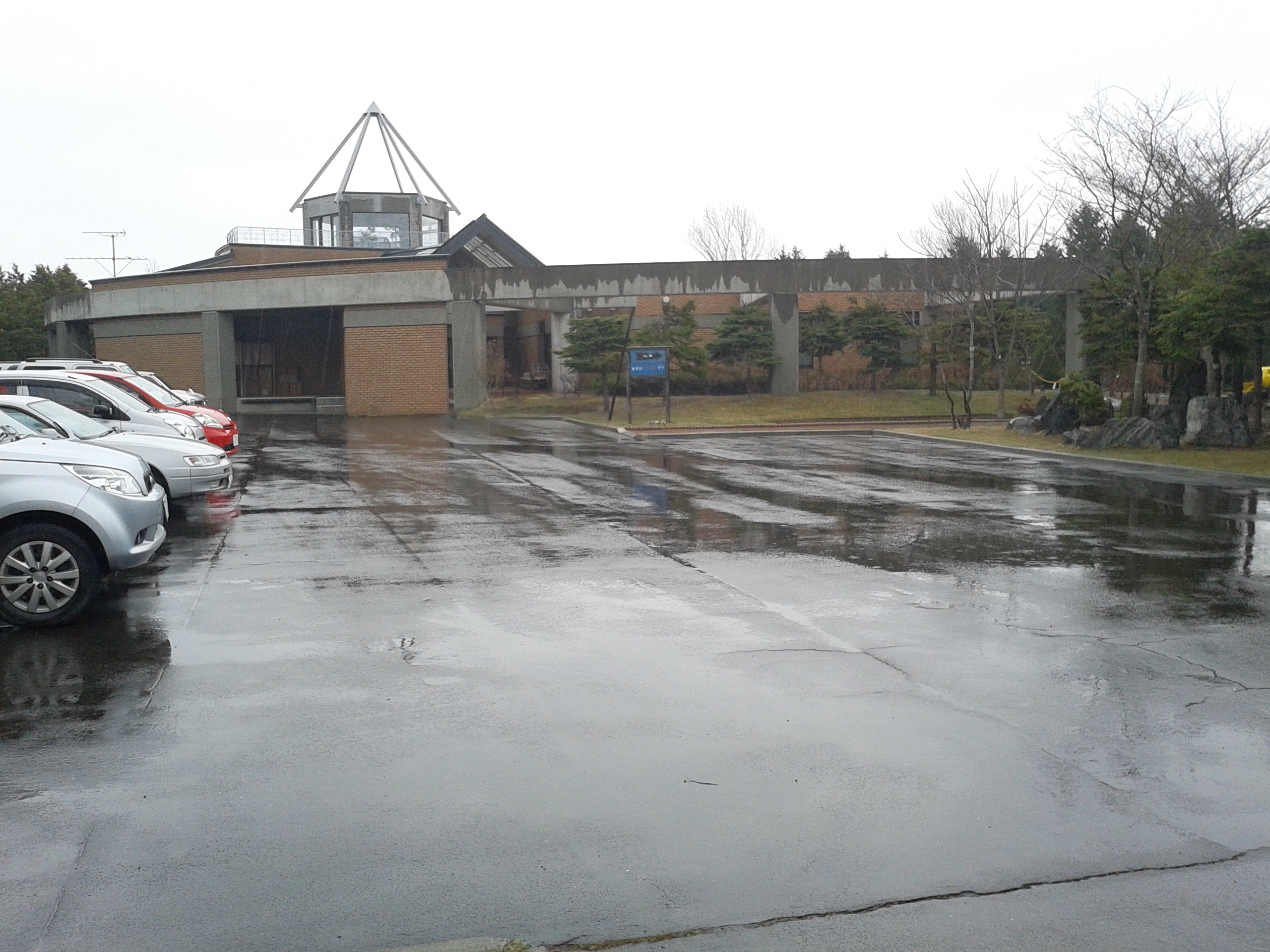
- Interactive map of the Eniwa City Historical Museum area

General information
- Location: 157-2 Minami-Shimamatsu, Eniwa, Hokkaidō, Japan
- Coordinates: 42°54′33″N 141°35′59″E
- Opened: 1990

Website
- Official website

Eniwa City Historical Museum (恵庭市郷土資料館, Eniwa-shi Kyōdo Shiryōkan) opened in Eniwa, Hokkaidō, Japan in 1990. The display is organized in accordance with six main themes: the land, early peoples (Jōmon, Zoku-Jōmon, and Satumon cultures), Ainu homeland, opening up the land, the birth of the village of Eniwa, and post-war. The collection includes an assemblage of Jōmon-period artefacts from the Karinba ruins that has been designated an Important Cultural Property.

== See also ==
- List of Cultural Properties of Japan - archaeological materials (Hokkaidō)
- List of Historic Sites of Japan (Hokkaidō)
- Hokkaido Museum
