= Ebetsu City Historical Museum =

History museum in Ebetsu, Japan

- 江別市郷土資料館
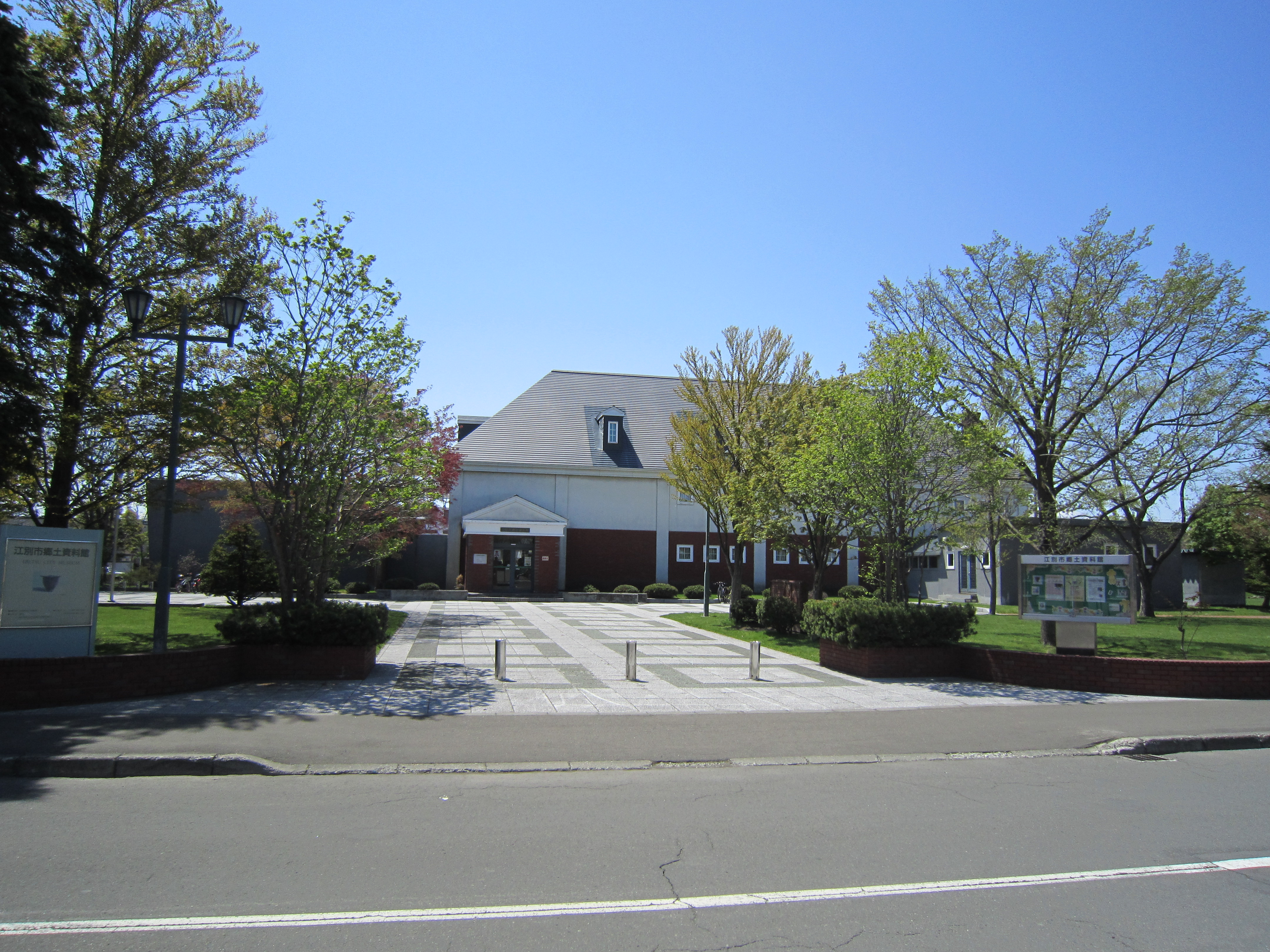
- Interactive map of the Ebetsu City Historical Museum area

General information
- Location: 1-38 Midorimachinishi, Ebetsu, Hokkaidō, Japan
- Coordinates: 43°06′49″N 141°32′53″E
- Opened: 10 April 1991

Website
- Official website

Ebetsu City Historical Museum (江別市郷土資料館, Ebetsu-shi Kyōdo Shiryōkan) opened in Ebetsu, Hokkaidō, Japan in 1991. The museum documents the history of Ebetsu from ancient times, with themes including settlement during the days of the Hokkaido Development Commission and the city's industries. The collection includes two dogū from the Jōmon-period Ōasa III Site, as well two assemblages of Zoku-Jōmon artefacts that have been designated Important Cultural Properties, from the Motoebetsu I Site and the Ebetsubuto Site.

== See also ==
- List of Cultural Properties of Japan - archaeological materials (Hokkaidō)
- List of Historic Sites of Japan (Hokkaidō)
- Hokkaido Archaeological Operations Center
- Hokkaido Museum
