= Susuya culture =

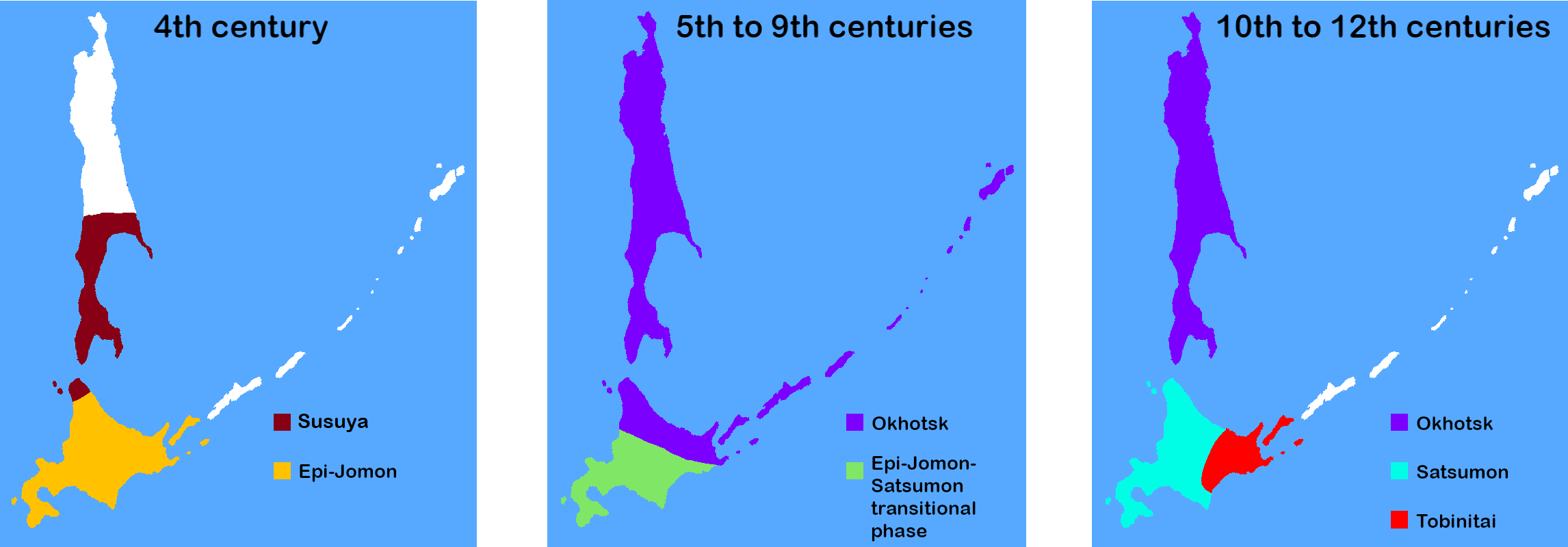
- Alternative names: Incipient Okhotsk
- Dates: 2500–1600 BP
- Followed by: Okhotsk culture

The Susuya culture, alternatively referred to as the earliest phase of the Okhotsk culture by some scholars, is an archaeological coastal fishing and hunter-gatherer culture that developed around the southern coastal regions of the Sea of Okhotsk, including Sakhalin and northern Hokkaido.

== Classification ==
Maeda (1987) considered the Susuya type pottery to be the marker of the earliest phase of the Okhotsk culture. However, some archaeologists argue that the Towada phase was the beginning of the Okhotsk culture and that the Susuya phase preceded the Okhotsk culture (Ohyi, 1982). It is certain that the Towada phase was included in the Okhotsk culture based on the results of not only archaeological investigations but also osteological studies. The present lack of human skeletal remains of the Susuya phase prevents definite statement whether the Susuya phase belonged to the Okhotsk culture.

== Pottery ==
Susuya ceramics are represented by round, sharp, and flat-based vessels with a wide open mouth. Decoration consists of compositions of string and comb impressions. Sites containing pottery of this kind are grouped within a separate Susuya culture. These are associated with Epi-Jomon traditions dating from the 5th to the 4th centuries in southern Sakhalin and from the 2nd to the 5th centuries in southern Sakhalin and northern Hokkaido.

== Subsistence ==
The subsistence pattern of the Susuya culture was much the same as that of the Okhotsk, consisting of sea-mammal hunting, sea gathering and some land gathering. The Susuya focused on the processing of intermediate trophic-level aquatic resources, and the early Okhotsk specialised towards isotopically enriched marine products. In the Susuya Culture household at Kafukai 2 (~100–500 CE), biomolecular evidence indicates that ceramic cooking pots were primarily used to process intermediate trophic-level anadromous resources, mixed sporadically with foods from the marine, terrestrial animal and plant food webs. By paying close attention to the species of domestic animals, more dog remains than pigs have been found in the Susuya Shell Mound and Rutaka Site.

== See also ==
- Okhotsk culture
- Zoku-Jōmon period
