= Karinba site =

Archaeological site in Eniwa, Hokkaido of Japan

- カリンバ遺跡 (Japanese)
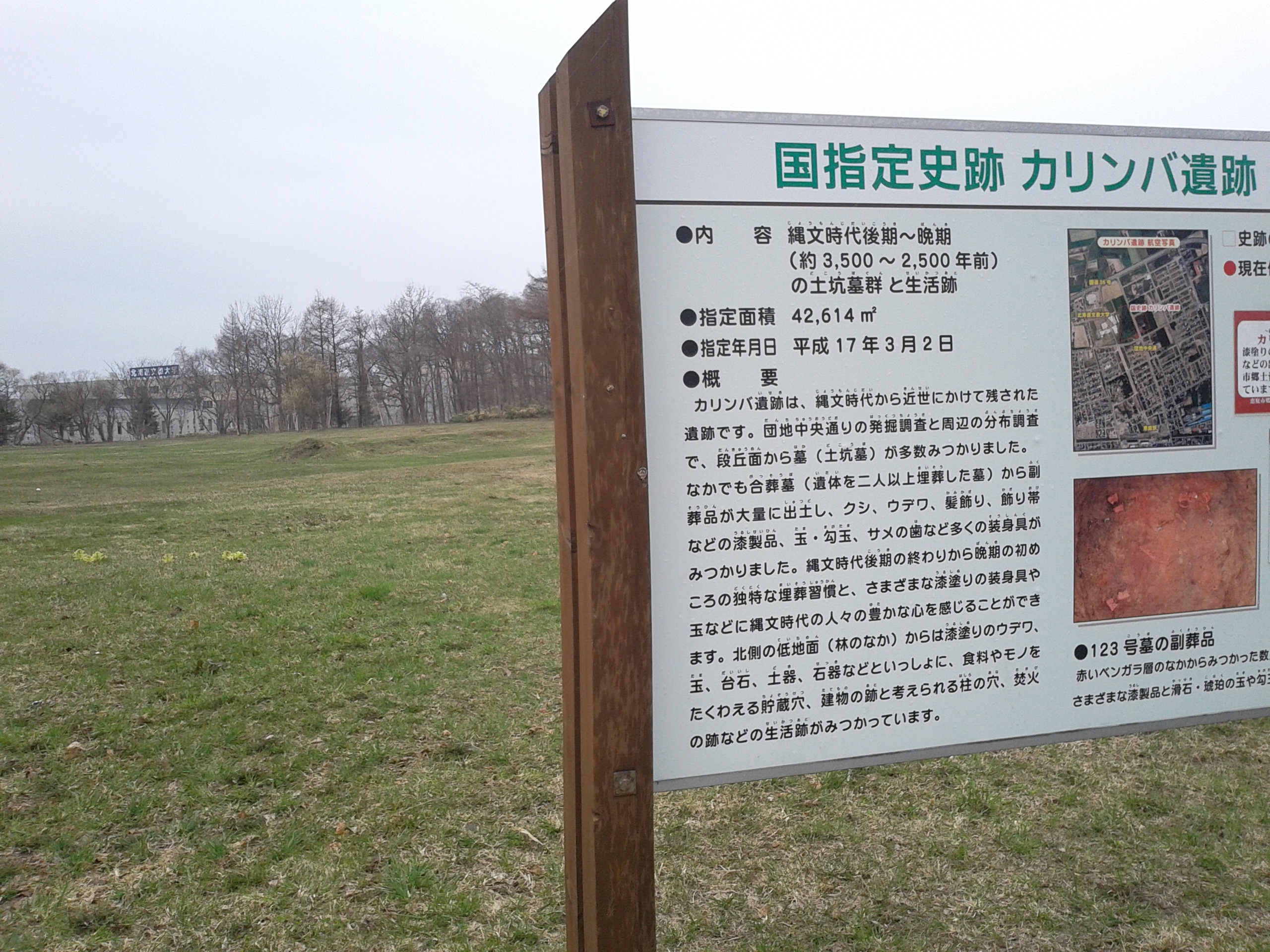
- Karinba site

- Karinba site Karinba site (Japan)
- Interactive map of Karinba site
- 42°53′19″N 141°35′41″E
- Location: Eniwa, Hokkaidō, Japan

The Karinba site (カリンバ遺跡, Karinba iseki) is an archaeological site located in the Koganei neighbourhood of the city of Eniwa, Hokkaidō, Japan. It was designated a National Historic Site in 1998.

== Overview ==
The Karinba site contains the remains of tombs and dwellings ranging from the Initial Jōmon period (approximately 7000 BCE) to the early modern Ainu culture. The settlement received a surge of people in 2000 BCE. The remains span the lowlands of the now-defunct Karinba River (Karinba means "cherry tree bark" in Ainu) and a terraced surface two to three meters higher than the river. The remains of communal burials, containing large quantities of grave goods, including numerous lacquerware produced from the late to final Jōmon period (approximately 3,000 years ago), are particularly noteworthy, and all grave goods excavated from three communal burials were collectively designated an Important Cultural Property. In addition to lacquerware, the grave goods include beads, magatama, shark teeth, and pottery.

In 1999, during road construction as part of a land readjustment project, excavations were conducted south of the former Karinba River, resulting in the discovery of numerous pit burials, including a group of pit burials from the late Jōmon period, along with a large number of grave goods. A distribution survey was conducted between 2000 and 2003, and in 2005, approximately 4.26 hectares of terrace and low ground was designated as a National Historic Site.

Graves from the historical Satsumon culture (700–1200 CE) have been found around Eniwa, at the Moizari Kofun Site (茂漁古墳群, Moizari kofun-gun). The style is similar to that of the Ebetsu Kofun Site and northern Tōhoku historic graves. During the Ainu settlement period (1200 CE until the Meiji era), there is historical evidence for settlements in the villages and further away on the plains.

The collection at the Eniwa City Historical Museum includes an assemblage of Jōmon-period artifacts from the Karinba site that has been designated an Important Cultural Property.

The site is about a 10-minute walk from Eniwa Station on the JR Hokkaido Chitose Line.

== See also ==
- List of Historic Sites of Japan (Hokkaidō)
