= Yakumo Town Museum =

- 八雲町郷土資料館
- Interactive map of the Yakumo Town Museum area

General information
- Location: 154 Suehiro-chō, Yakumo, Hokkaidō, Japan
- Coordinates: 42°15′16″N 140°16′06″E
- Opened: 20 May 1978

Technical details
- Floor count: 2
- Floor area: 783 square metres (8,430 sq ft)

Website
- Official website

Yakumo Town Museum (八雲町郷土資料館, Yakumo-chō Kyōdo Shiryōkan) opened in Yakumo, Hokkaidō, Japan in 1978.

== History ==
Its origins lie in a room for the display of historical materials established in 1952 in the old public hall, superseded in 1965 by storage facilities and an exhibition space in the new public hall.

== Displays ==
The display is organized around three main themes: history and the land, the Hokkaido Development Commission and the lives of the people, and local industries, including mining and the craft of kibori-guma, a museum of which lies next door.

== Collection ==
The collection of over thirteen thousand objects includes a Jōmon red ceramic vessel with spout from the Nodaoi I Site and an assemblage of artefacts from the Jōmon Kotan Onsen Site that has been designated an Important Cultural Property.

== See also ==
- List of Cultural Properties of Japan - archaeological materials (Hokkaidō)
- List of Historic Sites of Japan (Hokkaidō)
- Hokkaido Museum
