= Okhotsk Museum Esashi =

- オホーツクミュージアムえさし
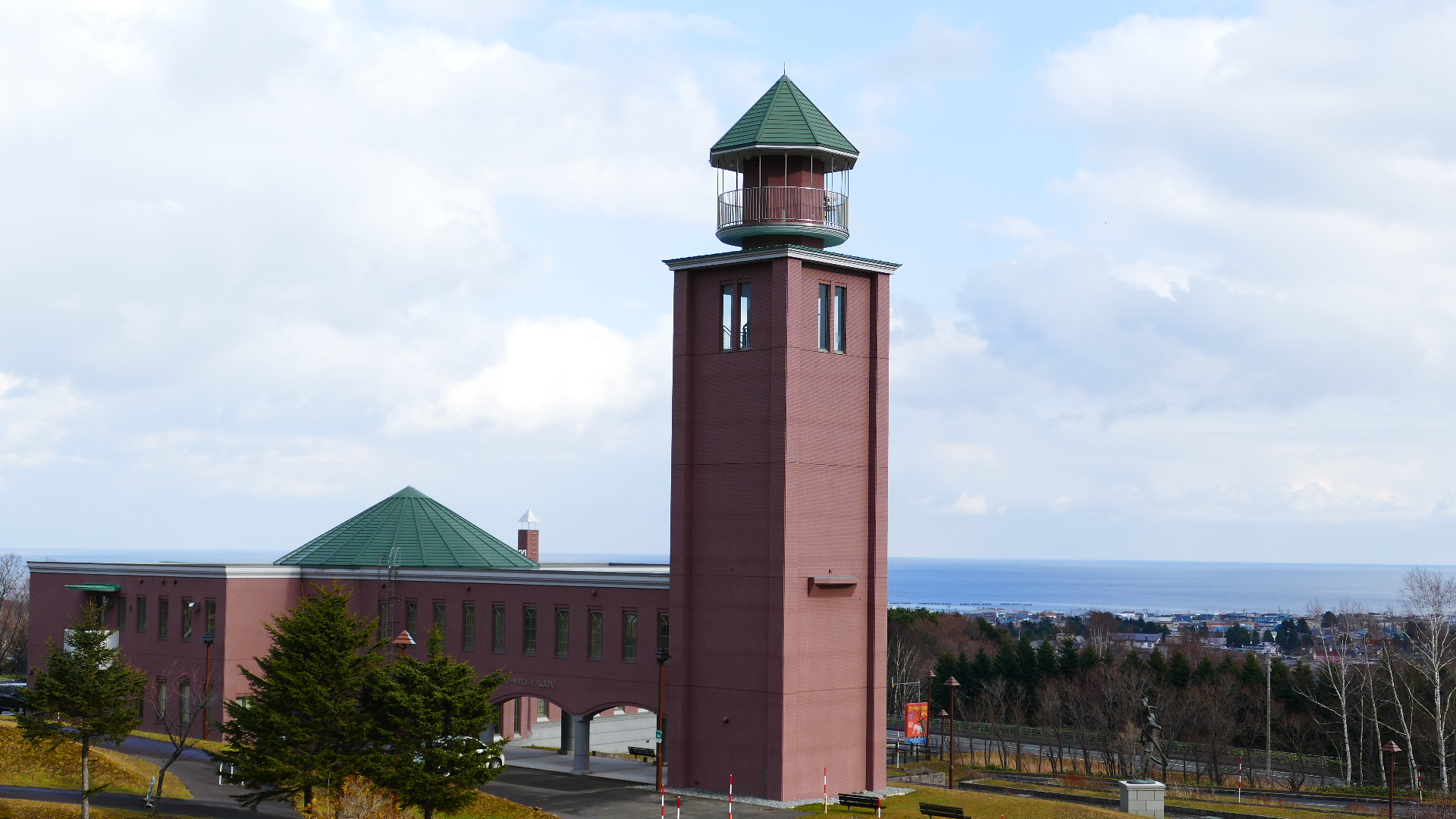
- Interactive map of the Okhotsk Museum Esashi area

General information
- Location: 1614-1 Mikasa-chō, Esashi, Hokkaidō, Japan
- Coordinates: 44°56′21″N 142°34′03″E
- Opened: 1999

Website
- Official website

Okhotsk Museum Esashi (オホーツクミュージアムえさし, Ohōtsuku Myūjiamu Esashi) opened in Esashi, Hokkaidō, Japan in 1999. Dedicated to the history and natural history of Esashi and the Sea of Okhotsk coast, the collection includes the Important Cultural Property Artefacts Excavated from the Menashidomari Site, Hokkaidō.

== Collection ==
The collection focuses on the early culture of the Okhotsk region, which was based mostly around fishing. The museum houses models of cave dwellings, ancient earthenware, and artefacts collected from the Menashidomari Site, which are designated as an Important Cultural Property.

The museum also has a natural history collection, consisting of a number of taxidermy animals, and a 7m long skeletal specimen of Japan's largest type of killer whale.

== Opening hours ==
The museum is open from 9AM to 5PM, with closing days on Mondays and the last Tuesday of the month. The museum is closed for the New Years holidays from 30 December – 4 January.

== See also ==
- List of Historic Sites of Japan (Hokkaido)
- North Okhotsk Prefectural Natural Park
- Hokkaido Museum
