= Tarukishi Site =

Japanese late Paleolithic archaeological site

Coordinates: 42°45′49″N 140°16′10.8″E

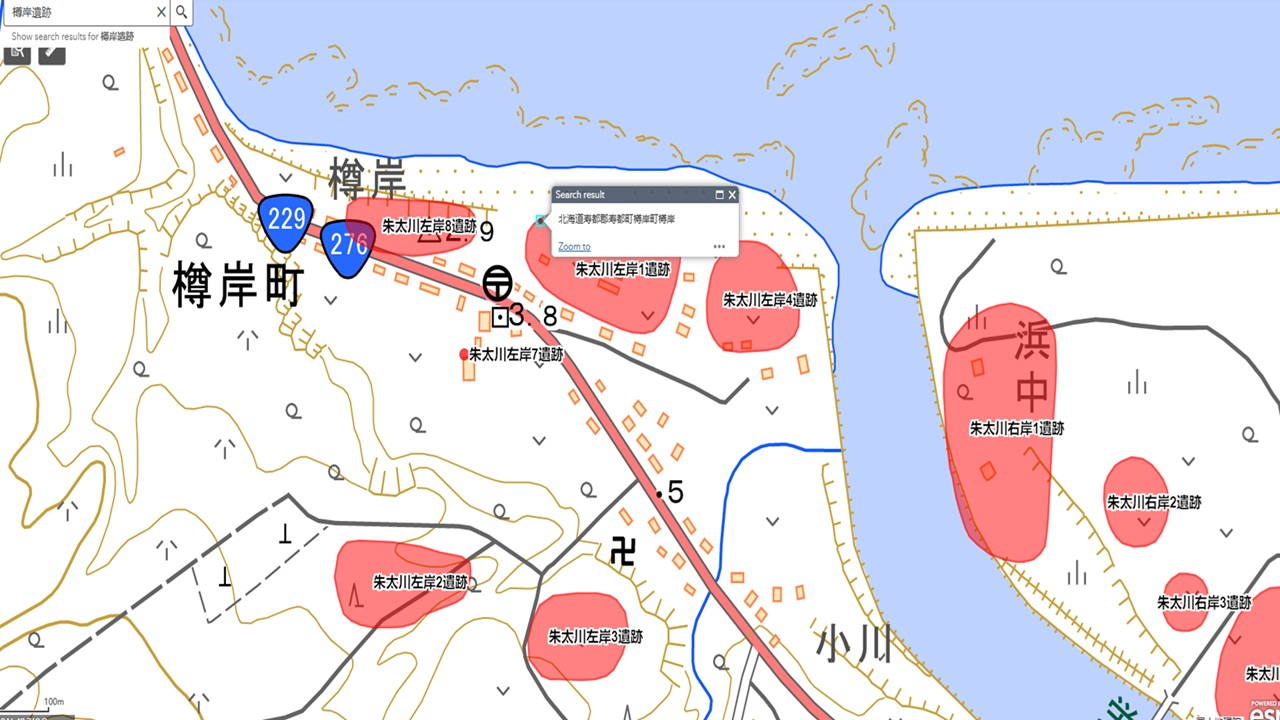
Location of Tarukishi Site

The Tarukishi Site (Japanese: 樽岸遺跡, Hepburn: Tarukishi iseki) (also Tarugishi) is a late Paleolithic archeological site that was discovered in 1954. The site is near 141 Igarashi, Kuromatsunai, Suttsu District, Shiribeshi Subprefecture, Hokkaido, Japan. The excavated remains were designated a Tangible Cultural Property of Hokkaido on December 20, 1957.

The site lies on a river terrace near the Sea of Japan and its artifacts lie at a depth of about 50 centimeters (20 in). The site is about 147.5 square meters (176.4 sq yd). A farmer found large stone blades but no pottery and reported it to the Hakodate City Museum. The initial research team, led by the Hakodate City Museum, excavated the Tarukishi ruins. The team included staff from the Hakodate City Museum, as well as Hiromichi Kono of Hokkaido University of Education, Toshio Oba of Hokkaido University, and Sosuke Sugihara of Meiji University.

== Stone tools ==
The Tarukishi Site was the first in Hokkaido to have a blade industry. Besides large blades, side and end scrapers, cores, and flakes were also found. All of the artifacts excavated were stone tools made from shale, including large stone blades, end scrapers, and stone cores made using the blade technique, which are clearly different from stone tools from the Jomon period, but no pottery was found. The excavation report considered the stone tools to be dated to an earlier stage of the Late Paleolithic period, but subsequent research has led to the stone tools now being recognized as belonging to the microblade culture of the latter half of the Late Paleolithic period. The excavation of the Tarugishi site was a monumental event in the dawn of Paleolithic research in Hokkaido, and the 72 items excavated, including stone blades, flake tools, boat-shaped stone tools, cores, and flakes, were designated as Hokkaido Tangible Cultural Properties in 1957.

== See also ==
- List of archaeological sites in Japan
