= Shiretoko Museum =

Museum in Hokkaidō, Japan

- 知床博物館
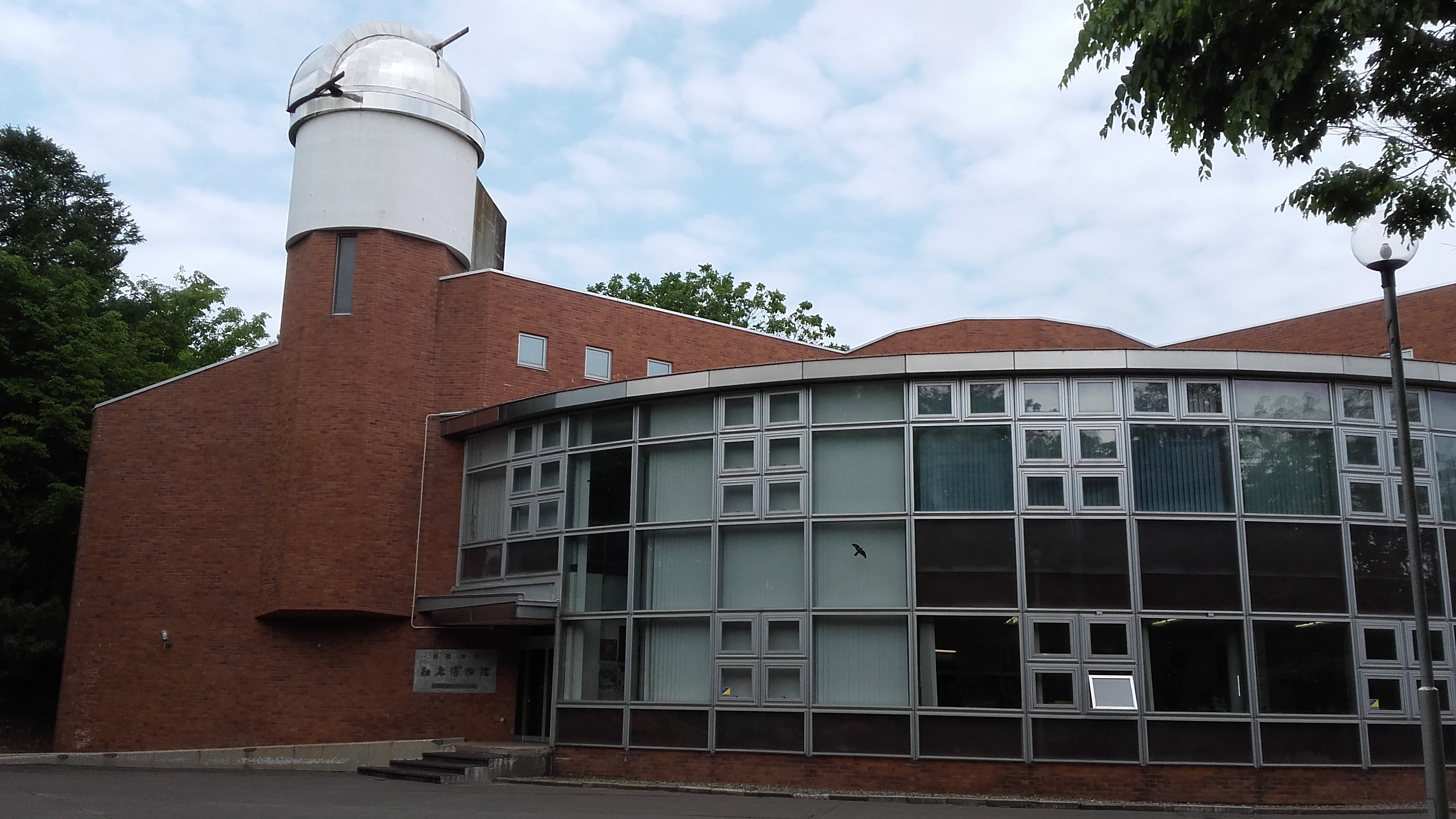

- Location within Hokkaido Location within Japan

General information
- Location: 49-2 Honmachi, Shari, Hokkaidō, Japan
- Coordinates: 43°54′47″N 144°40′23″E
- Opened: 28 December 1978

Technical details
- Floor count: 2

Website
- Official website

The Shiretoko Museum (知床博物館, Shiretoko Hakubutsukan) opened in Shari, Hokkaidō, Japan in 1978 to mark the 100th anniversary of the municipality's foundation. The collection and displays relate to the natural and human history of the Shiretoko Peninsula.

In 1993, the Memorial Hall of Shari's Sister Town Relationships (姉妹町友好都市交流記念館) opened next door, with exhibits relating to Taketomi, Hirosaki, and the Shiretoko Neputa festival.

== See also ==
- Shiretoko National Park
- Abashiri Quasi-National Park
- Sharidake Prefectural Natural Park
- List of Natural Monuments of Japan (Hokkaidō)
- Aomori Nebuta Matsuri
