= Hokkaido Archaeological Operations Center =

- 北海道立埋蔵文化財センター
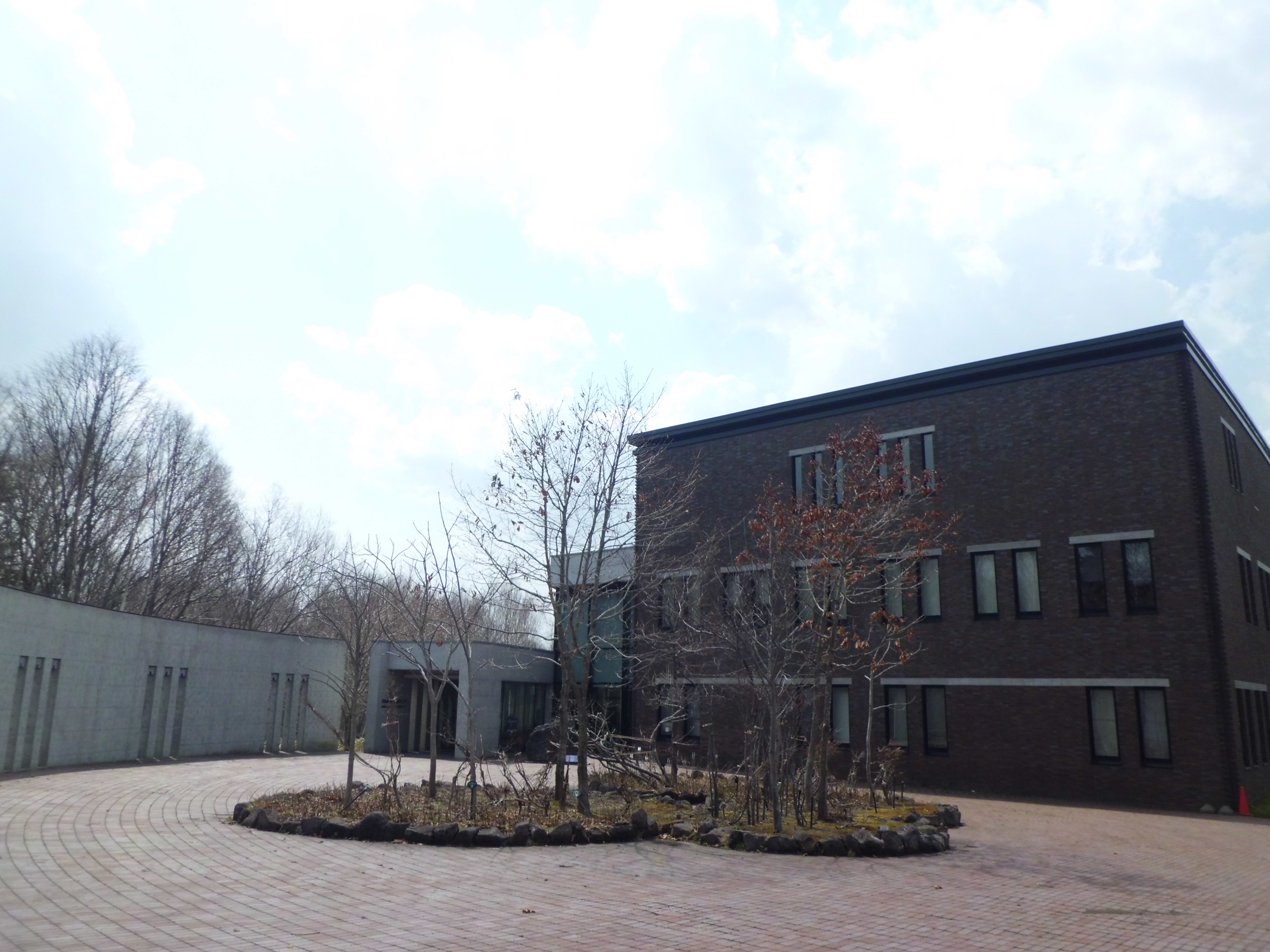
- Interactive map of the Hokkaido Archaeological Operations Center area

General information
- Location: 685-1 Nishi-nopporo, Ebetsu, Hokkaidō, Japan
- Coordinates: 43°03′36″N 141°29′40″E
- Opened: 1 April 1999

Website
- Official website

Hokkaido Archaeological Operations Center (北海道立埋蔵文化財センター, Hokkaidō-ritsu Maizō Bunkazai Sentaa) opened in Ebetsu, Hokkaidō, Japan in 1999. Its aim is to protect, preserve, and utilize buried cultural properties.

== History ==
In December 2017, researchers from the Hokkaido Archaeological Operations Center announced the discovery of the oldest ancient stone with a human face painted on it (12x13cm), estimating its creation date between 2,500 and 1,000 B.C.

== Description ==
The exhibition hall features two Important Cultural Properties: an earthen Jōmon mask from the Mamachi Site and artefacts excavated from the Bibi 8 Site.

== Collection ==
- From Chitose City: Stone rods unearthed at the (30 to 70 cm long), animal-shaped clay figure (Bibi-chan), Jomon clay mask
- 350x80x33cm chiseled monolith
- Magemono made of Thujopsis, excavated in Yukanboshi

== See also ==
- List of Cultural Properties of Japan - archaeological materials (Hokkaidō)
- List of Cultural Properties of Japan - historical materials (Hokkaidō)
- List of Historic Sites of Japan (Hokkaidō)
- Hokkaido Museum
- Ainu culture
