= Okhotsk culture =

5th–10th-century archaeological culture around the Sea of Okhotsk

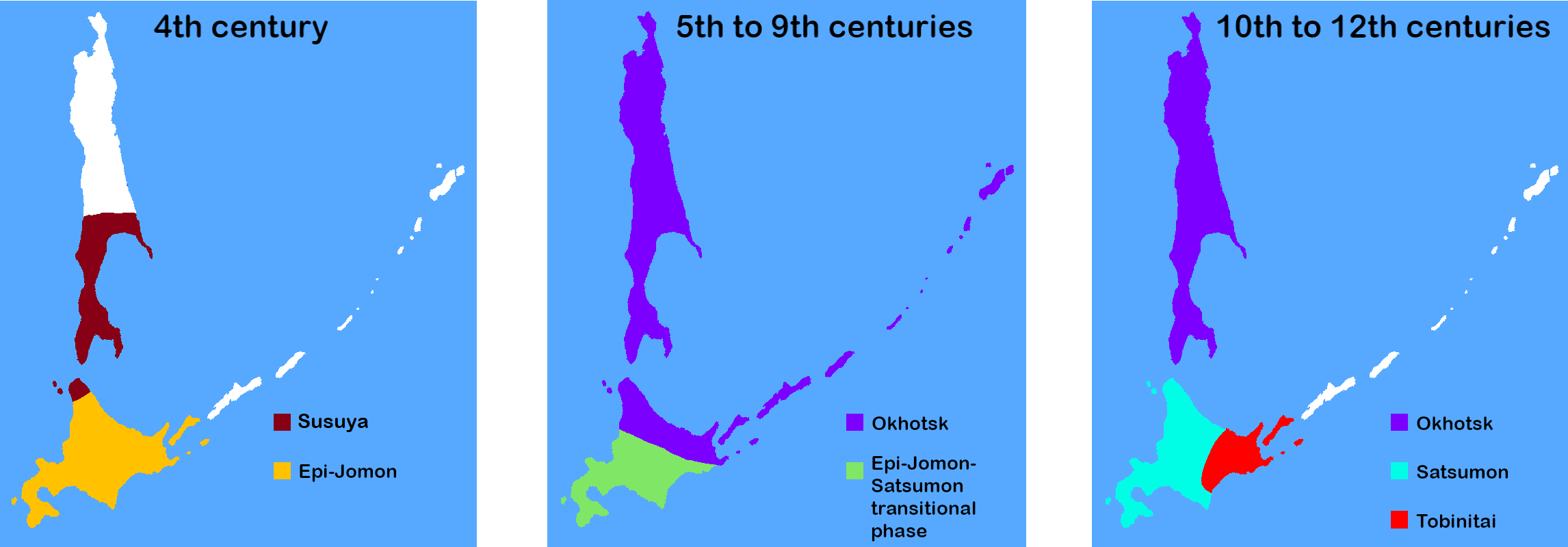
- Geographical range: Hokkaido, the Kuril Islands, and Sakhalin
- Preceded by: Susuya culture
- Followed by: Tobinitai culture, Ainu people

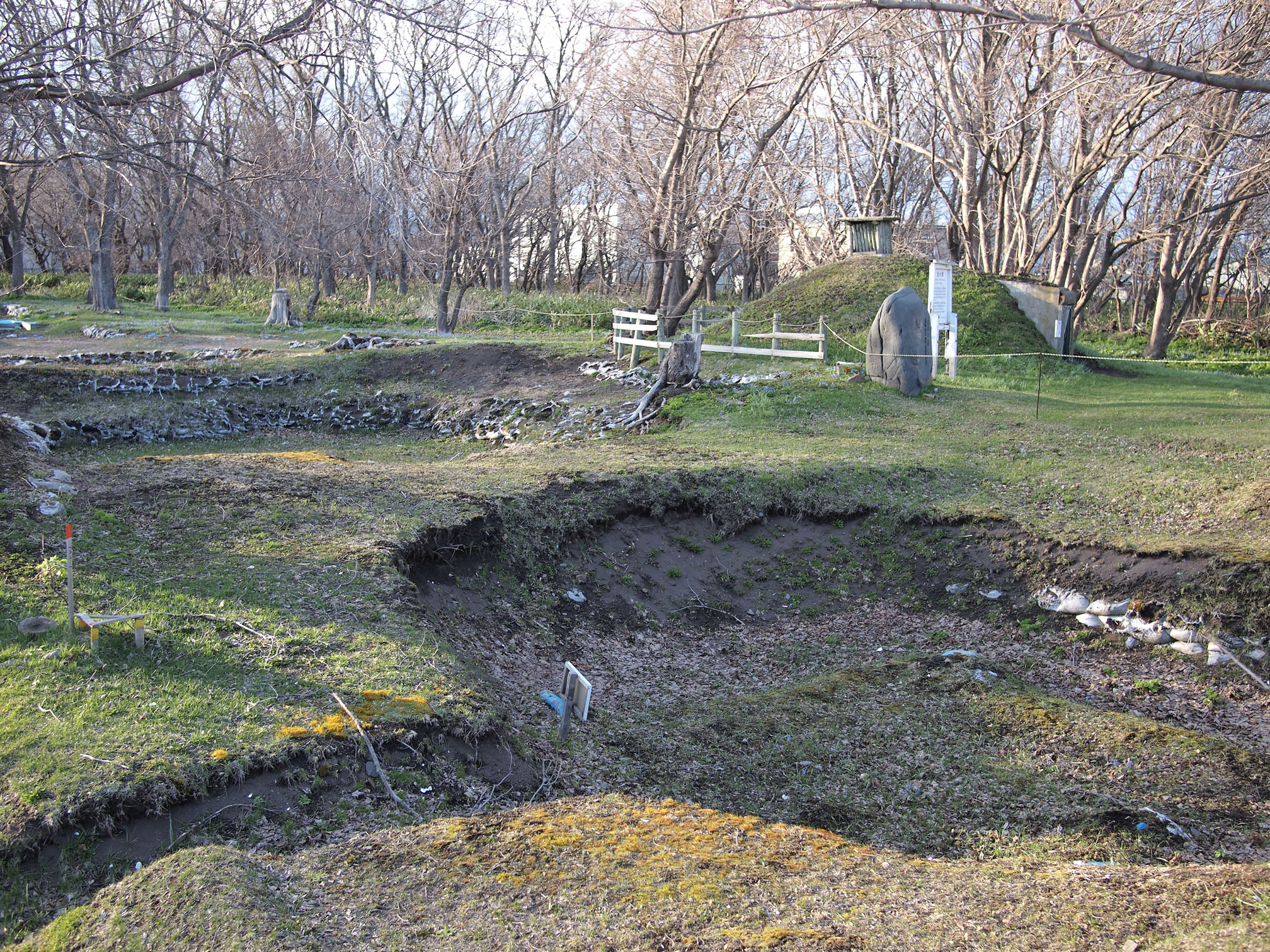
The Moyoro shell midden at Abashiri, Hokkaidō, belonging to the Okhotsk culture

The Okhotsk culture is an archaeological coastal fishing and hunter-gatherer culture that developed around the southern coastal regions of the Sea of Okhotsk, including Sakhalin, northeastern Hokkaido, and the Kuril Islands, during the last half of the first millennium to the early part of the second. The Okhotsk are often associated to be the ancestors of the Nivkh people, while others argue them to be identified with early Ainu speakers.

Bear worship, a practice shared by various Northern Eurasian peoples, including the Ainu and the Nivkh, was an important element of the Okhotsk culture, but was uncommon in the Jōmon period of Japan. Archaeological evidence indicates that the Okhotsk culture proper originated in the 5th century from the Susuya culture of southern Sakhalin and northwestern Hokkaido.

== Etymology ==
The Okhotsk culture is named after the eponymous Sea of Okhotsk, which is named after the Okhota river, which is in turn named after the Even word окат (okat) meaning "river".

== History ==
The Okhotsk culture is inferred to have formed on Sakhalin by the admixture of Jōmon people of Japan with Ancient Paleo-Siberians (represented by Chukotko-Kamchatkan speakers) and subsequent ancient Northeast Asian geneflow from the Amur region. Kisao Ishizuki of the Sapporo University suggests that the people of the Okhotsk culture were recorded under the name Mishihase on the Japanese record Nihon Shoki, while others suggest that the term Mishihase described a different group or one of the Nivkh-speaking groups. The Nihon Shoki (720 CE) includes the following entry for the year 544:

At Cape Minabe, on the northern side of the Island of Sado, there arrived men of Su-shen in a boat and stayed there. During the spring and summer, they caught fish, which they used for food. The men of that island said they were not human beings. They also called them devils and did not dare to go near them.

— Nihon Shoki, Book XIX

The name is written in kanji, referring to a people from Manchuria who appear in Chinese records as early as the 6th century BCE. The name 'Sushen' is believed to refer to Tungusic peoples ancestral to the Mohe and Jurchen (Aston 1972, II, 58). The use of 'Sushen' in Japanese records a thousand years after the name was first used in China, and can be understood as a way to define Japan's ethnocentric borders and distinctiveness from non-Yamato peoples. In the Japanese context, the term Sushen is probably best understood as a traditional label for 'northern people' or 'northern barbarians' rather than for a specific ethnic group from Manchuria or Sakhalin. According to later entries in the Nihon Shoki, the Sushen also lived in Hokkaido. During the reign of the Empress Kōgyoku (r. 655–661), Abe no Hirafu, Warden of Koshi Province (now the Hokuriku region), was sent on several military expeditions to the north by the Yamato Kingship of western Honshu. During these expeditions, the main enemies of Abe no Hirafu were these 'Sushen', who were attacking the Emishi. In the third month of 660:

Yamato State (marked in green).

Abe no Omi was sent on an expedition with a fleet of 200 ships against the land of Su-shen. Abe no Omi made some Yemishi of Michinoku embark on board his own ship. They arrived close to a great river. Upon this over a thousand Yemishi of Watari-shima assembled ... saying:- 'The Su-shen fleet has arrived in great force and threatens to slay us.' (Aston 1972, II, 263–264)

— Nihon Shoki, Book XXVI

The Okhotsk people were likely depicted as the repunkur ("people of the sea") in Ainu oral traditions. Donald Philippi states that, at the same time the stories frequently mention wars between the repunkur and the yaunkur ("people of the land", i.e. the Ainu themselves), or rather between the hero Poiyaunpe and the repunkur, Ainu heroes frequently married repunkur women. In the epic Kutune Sirka, Poiyaunpe was the son of a repunkur woman and married Nisap Tasum, who was also a repunkur. Regarding the yukar and stories, especially those concerning Poiyaunpe, Ainu linguist Chiri Mashiho argues as follows:

The antagonists of the Ainu in these wars are a foreign people called the rep-un-kur, which means "people from overseas." Among them there appear people from Santan (Santa-un-kur), and among these people from Santan there are some called Tuima-Santa-un-kur (people from distant Santa) who wear their hair behind their backs like cows' tails. This clearly has reference to pigtails, and the people must be from the continent. The heroes who appear in the yukar epics are all named after the localities they rule, such as Iyochi, Ishikari, Chupka, Omanpeshka, or Repunshir. Strangely, all of these places appear to be areas within the sphere of the so-called Okhotsk culture, where Okhotsk-type pottery is excavated. In other words, the yukar are tales of wars between two peoples: the yaunkur ("people of the land," "mainlanders," "natives of Hokkaido"), based in Hokkaido, and the repunkur, who came over the seas from the continent and maintained their bridgeheads in various parts of Hokkaido extending from the central part of the Japan Sea coast to the Okhotsk Sea coast. The arena of these wars is a broad area centering around the central, northern, and eastern parts of Hokkaido and including the Kuriles, Sakhalin, Rishiri, Rebun, and the northern Asian continent. [...] Thus, one can understand that the contents of the yukar deal with the ethnic conflicts which actually took place at that period.

There was a rapid disappearance of Okhotsk sites and artifacts from the Kuriles in the radiocarbon record. A drastic decline in radiocarbon dates occurs around 800 BP (1100 CE), with almost no radiocarbon samples yielding dates between 600 and 400 BP (1350-1550 CE). In Hokkaido, the absence of Okhotsk remains after 800 BP is largely considered a product of assimilation or integration of the Okhotsk culture with the Satsumon culture, which was expanding into southern and western Hokkaido.

With the onset of yet another cold period, the Little Ice Age, it can be hypothesized that the exchange relationships the Kuril Okhotsk maintained with populations in Kamchatka Peninsula did not provide the necessary access to materials or exchange partnerships to remain viable in the central and north central regions. With increasingly long winters, more difficult travel conditions, and potentially lower demand or higher costs for marine products, the incentives for continued habitation in the remote Kuriles may have declined. Given the concurrent combination of economic, social and environmental factors constraining habitation of this region, Okhotsk populations may simply have chosen to abandon their settlements in the Kuril Islands.

== Archaeogenetics ==
Distribution of mitochondrial DNA haplogroups in Hokkaido

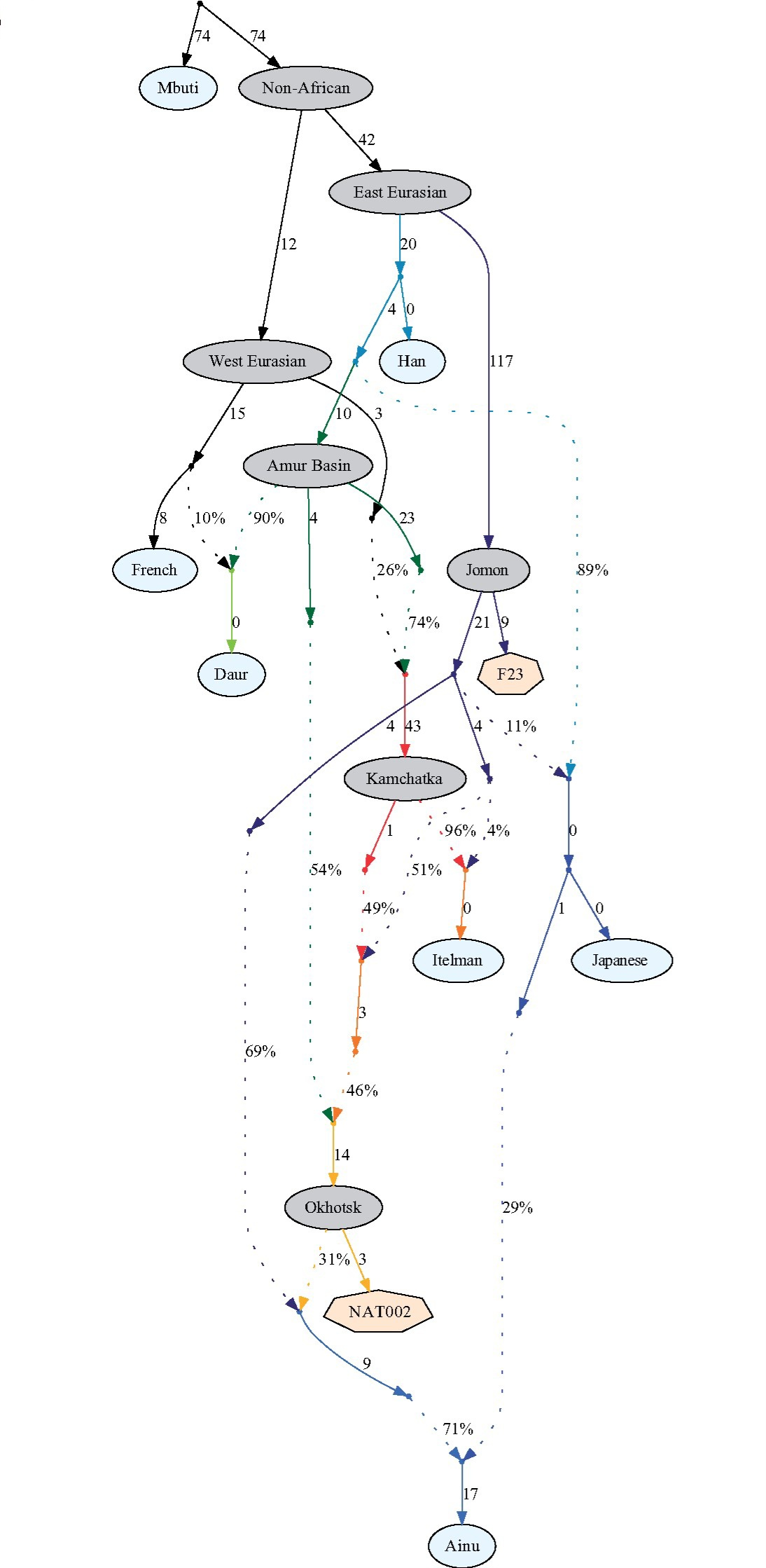
Admixture graph based on the genomic data of Okhotsk (NAT002), Jomon (F23), and modern populations

Morphological studies of the skeletal remains of the Okhotsk people have suggested broad similarity to populations currently living around the Amur Basin and in northern Sakhalin, but also hinting to a more heterogenous makeup. Full genome analyses of Okhotsk remains found them to be derived from three major sources, notably Ancient Northeast Asians, Ancient Paleo-Siberians, and Jōmon people of Japan. An admixture analysis revealed them to carry c. 54% Ancient Northeast Asian, c. 22% Ancient Paleo-Siberian, and c. 24% Jōmon ancestries respectively.

=== Haplogroups ===
Mitochondrial DNA haplogroups Y1, G1b, and N9b, which were shared among the Lower Amur populations at high frequencies, were commonly detected among Okhotsk skeletal remains (Sato et al. 2009b), which suggests that the Okhotsk people originated in the Lower Amur region. The mitochondrial haplogroup frequencies in 37 Okhotsk skeletal remains from a 2009 study were as follows: A, 8.1%; B5, 2.7%; C3, 5.4%; G1, 24.3%; M7, 5.4%; N9, 10.8%; Y, 43.2%. Thus, in the mitochondrial gene pool of the Okhotsk people, haplogroup Y was major. This genetic feature is similar to those of populations currently living around the lower regions of the Amur River, such as the Ulchi, Nivkhi, and Negidals. The findings show that the Okhotsk people are genetically closer to populations currently living around the lower regions of the Amur River as well as to the Ainu people of Hokkaido. Moreover, the study indicates that the Okhotsk people were also affected by gene flow from the Kamchatka peninsula.

== Subsistence ==
A distinctive trait of the Okhotsk culture was its subsistence strategy, traditionally categorised as a specialised system of marine resource gathering. This is in accord with the geographic distribution of archeological sites in coastal regions and confirmed by studies of animal remains and tools, that pointed to intensive marine hunting, fishing, and gathering activities. Stable nitrogen isotope studies in human remains also point to a diet with rich protein intake derived from marine organisms. Collagen analysis of human bones revealed a relative contribution of marine protein in a range of 60 to 94% for individuals from Rebun Island and from 80 to 90% for individuals from eastern Hokkaido. However, there is enough evidence to suggest that the Okhotsk people's diet was much more diverse than isotopic data suggests. Their diet was probably complemented with terrestrial mammals, such as deer, foxes, rabbits, and martens. Cut marks in domesticated dog bones suggest they were also part of the diet, and remains of domestic pigs are limited to the north of Hokkaido. There is also evidence of the use of cultivation of barley and foraging of wild plants, including Aralia, Polygonum, Actinidia, Vitis, Sambucus, crowberry, Rubus sp., Phellodendron amurense, and Juglans. Little is known about the role of these plants in the economy or if they had dietary or ritual roles.

== Economy ==
Kikuchi Toshihiko has shown that many of the bronzes and other exotic artifacts found in Okhotsk sites originated in Manchuria and the Russian Far East. At the same time, it has long been suggested that trade in animal furs was a significant component of the Okhotsk economy. However, there is little evidence to suggest the importance of long-distance trade or specialized production for exchange. Objects clearly obtained through trade with areas outside the Okhotsk culture are rare. Most such objects come from two sites, Menashi-domari and Moyoro, and few trade goods have been found at Okhotsk sites in the La Pérouse Strait or on Sakhalin. The available archaeological and documentary evidence, therefore, lends little support to suggestions that the Okhotsk people were heavily involved in trading in marine mammal products with Manchuria or Japan. Compositional analysis of pottery and obsidian demonstrate that Okhotsk populations living in the remote Kuril Islands had broader and denser exchange networks compared to Zoku-Jōmon populations. In particular, obsidian sourcing demonstrates the extensive procurement and use of Kamchatka obsidian by Okhotsk populations inhabiting the remote islands.

== Culture ==
=== Pottery ===
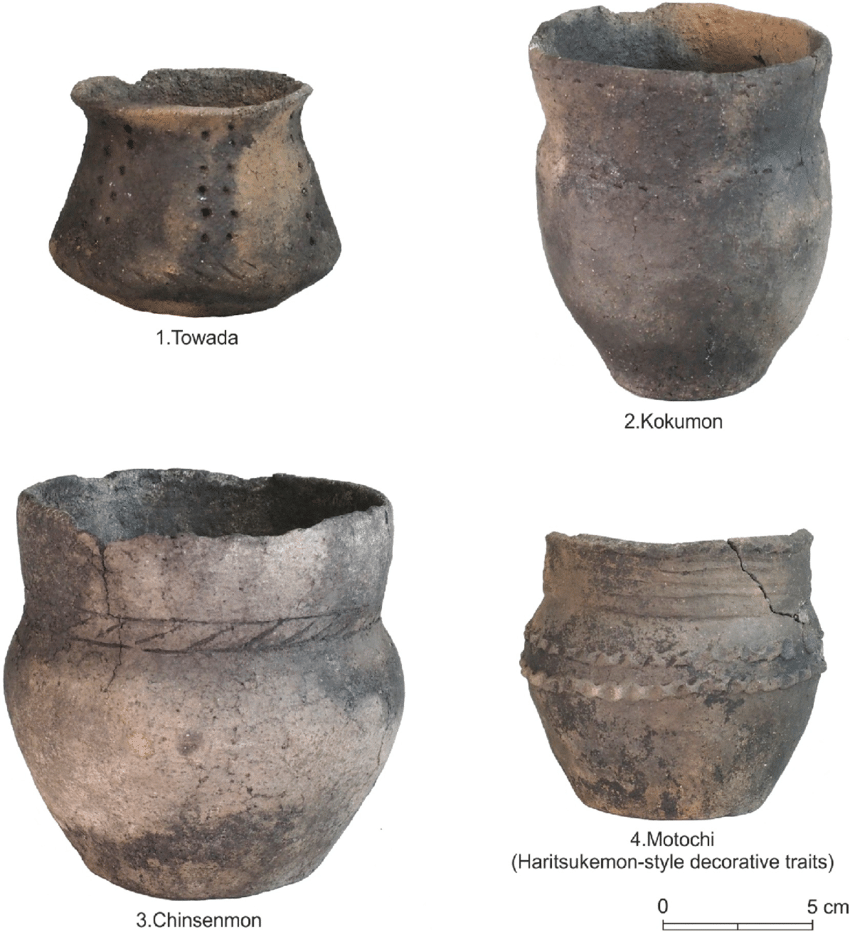
Examples of the four most common primary decorative motifs for the Northern Hokkaido Okhotsk Culture pottery, present at the Hamanaka 2 site in layers V, IV, IIIa-e and IIb-c

Pottery produced by the Okhotsk is flat based and has a plain body. Decoration is concentrated around the exterior of the rim showing several types of easily distinguishable decorative motifs. The Okhotsk cultural sequence can be divided into four stages in northern Hokkaido, according to the four main styles of pottery. Given the challenges associated with the dating of Okhotsk culture assemblages – as most datable materials are heavily exposed to marine reservoir effects – most chronological work on the Okhotsk is based on comparative analyses of pottery and seriation. The most distinctive and common external feature of Okhotsk ceramic containers is the thick residual organic residue inside and outside the orifice and on the upper part of the walls, and sometimes in the lower part as well. Phosphate chemical analysis of the residue reveals a high content of phosphorus, which indicates an animal origin of organic matter rich in fat. The main function of this pottery was cooking animal products.

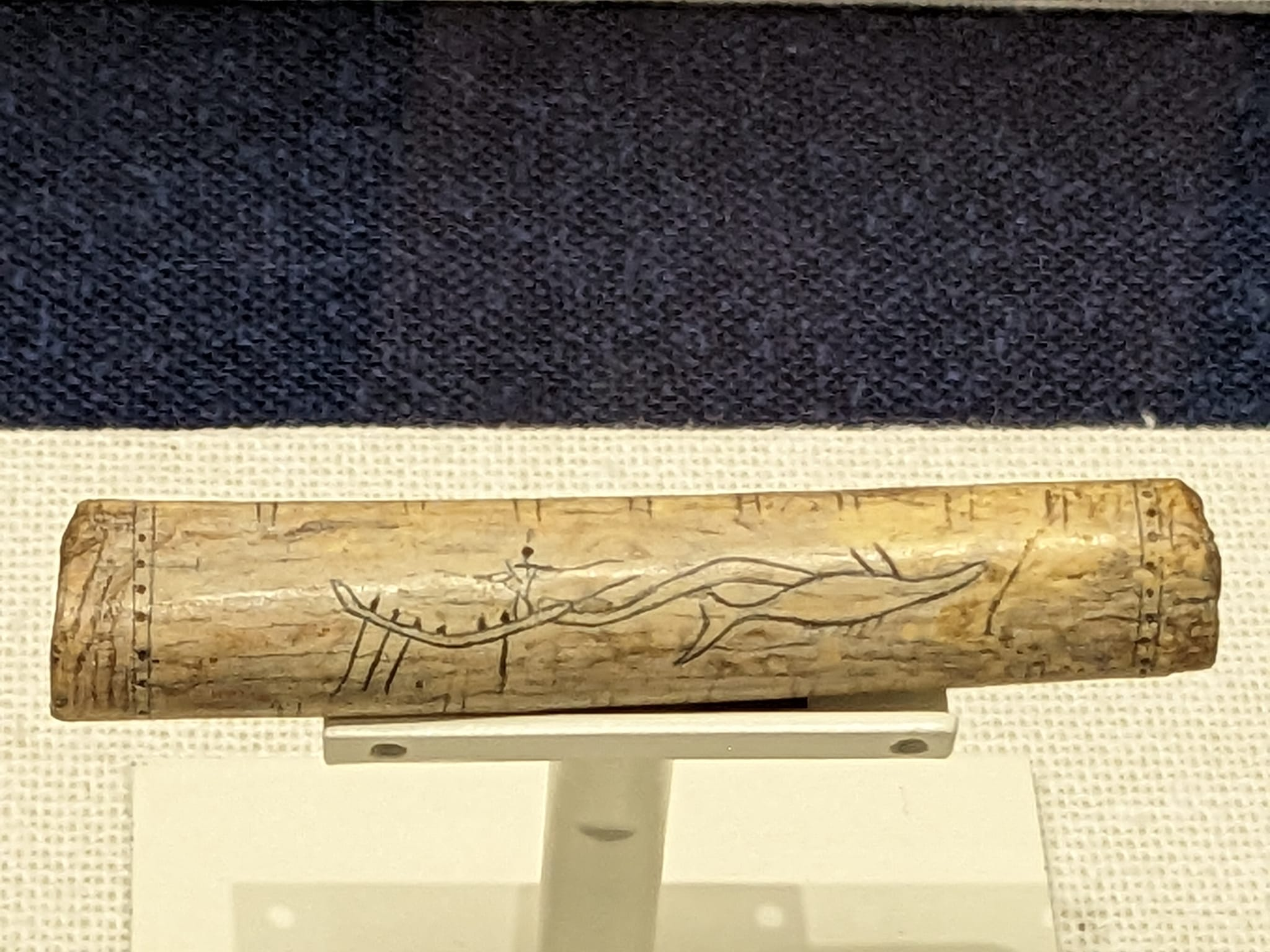
Bone needle case from the Okhotsk culture period (excavated from Benten Island in Nemuro, Hokkaido). The surface is engraved with a pattern depicting whale hunting.

Pottery assemblages from the late stage of the Okhotsk culture provide evidence of certain innovations. These include the somewhat diminishing role of large cooking vessels and the appearance of a series of small, wide-mouthed pots. This phenomenon may be explained by social, ecological, and technological changes that occurred in the late stage of the Okhotsk culture, spanning the 10th to 13th centuries. During this period a growth in the use of imported metal items took place. Some sites contain evidence of iron cauldrons obviously used for cooking. Such containers are much more effective and long-Iasting than non-hermetic and fragile ceramic vessels. Considering the harsh climatic conditions of Sakhalin, which is problematic for pottery making, the gradual decline of this craft with the arrival of metal pots is likely.

Some sites attributed to the Okhotsk reveal the remains of thermal structures used for heating and cooking. These structures were built of clay or stone slabs and located inside pit houses. Thermal structures for heating and cooking are known in archaeological sites on Hokkaido dated to the 6th or 7th to the 12th or 13th centuries. These data may be interpreted as probable evidence that the Okhotsk people were acquainted with the principles of thermal processes and built special thermal structures not only for heating and cooking but also for primitive metalworking and pottery firing.

=== Religion ===
The Okhotsk of Rebun Island transported adult and cub Ussuri brown bears from Hokkaido for ceremonial activities, while also practicing small-scale Japanese boar and Hokkaido dog rearing.

Ten ivory figurines depicting females with elaborate clothing are known from Okhotsk sites in both northern and eastern Hokkaido. A baby quadruped on a figurine from the Hamanaka 2 site on Rebun has been interpreted as a bear cub by Maeda. If correct, this may link women with the raising of bears for rituals. This is important because bears probably became "socially valued goods" in Okhotsk society, and a DNA analysis of brown bear remains from Kafukai has shown that juvenile bears were brought by boat from southwest Hokkaido to Rebun. Bear rituals were important in Okhotsk households but there is no evidence (from burials for example) that female status increased because of their involvement in shamanistic activities related to bear ceremonies.

Like the Ainu, the Okhotsk also appear to have engaged in the rearing of live bear cubs, and these earlier traditions may have been the origins of later Ainu practices. Many interpretations of the significance of Okhotsk human-animal interactions draw on direct historical analogies with the Ainu. The parallels are often striking – for example, in almost all households of the Okhotsk Culture, bear crania are gathered in the sacred rear part of the house and placed on a special raised platform shrine – this may have formed a sacred area with access restricted to certain members of the group. Many Okhotsk culture sites also contain abundant evidence for a much wider repertoire of elaborate and deeply respectful animal-related mythology, including animal burials, clusters of animal bones subjected to ritualized treatments, with some clusters found in association with elaborate carved objects, that together may have been utilized as part of specific rituals.

Another dimension to human-animal cosmological relations is the sanctity of shell middens. Again, there appears to be deep continuity between traditions of the Okhotsk and Ainu cultures. In the Ainu culture, shell middens contain a wide range of marine fauna, such as abalone, which are not viewed as discarded food or refuse but rather as sacred areas belonging to the ancestors and the kamuy. In and around these middens, animals, plants, tools, and other objects important to the Ainu are deposited (and thus returned to the divine) through the celebration of sending rites. This tradition aligns well with the material culture and settlement patterning witnessed at numerous Okhotsk sites, where shell middens accumulate around the habitats and other social spaces. Plenty of material evidence suggests that rituals were performed in these areas; for instance, at the Hamanaka 2 site, several human and dog burials were documented in shell-midden contexts. The Okhotsk may therefore have regarded shell middens similarly, or even passed on this tradition to the Ainu in the early 2nd millennium.
