= Zoku-Jōmon period =

Japanese history from c. 340 BC to 700 AD

The Zoku-Jōmon period (続縄文時代) (c. 340 BC–700 AD), also referred to as the Epi-Jōmon period, is the time in Japanese prehistory that saw the flourishing of the Zoku-Jōmon culture, a continuation of Jōmon culture in northern Tōhoku and Hokkaidō that corresponds with the Yayoi period and Kofun period elsewhere. Zoku-Jōmon ("continuing cord-marking") in turn gave way to Satsumon ("brushed pattern" or "scraped design") around the seventh century or in the Nara period (710–794). The "Yayoinisation" of northeast Honshū took place in the mid-Yayoi period; use of the term Zoku-Jōmon is then confined to those, in Hokkaidō, who did not "become Yayoi". Despite the elements of continuity emphasised by the name, which include the continuing production of cord-marked ceramics, ongoing employment of stone technology, and non-transition to rice-based agriculture, all Jōmon hallmarks, the Zoku-Jōmon period nevertheless saw a "major break in mobility and subsistence patterns".

== See also ==
- History of Japan
- Okhotsk culture
