= Satsumon culture =

Partially archaeological, agricultural period of northern Honshū and Hokkaidō, Japan

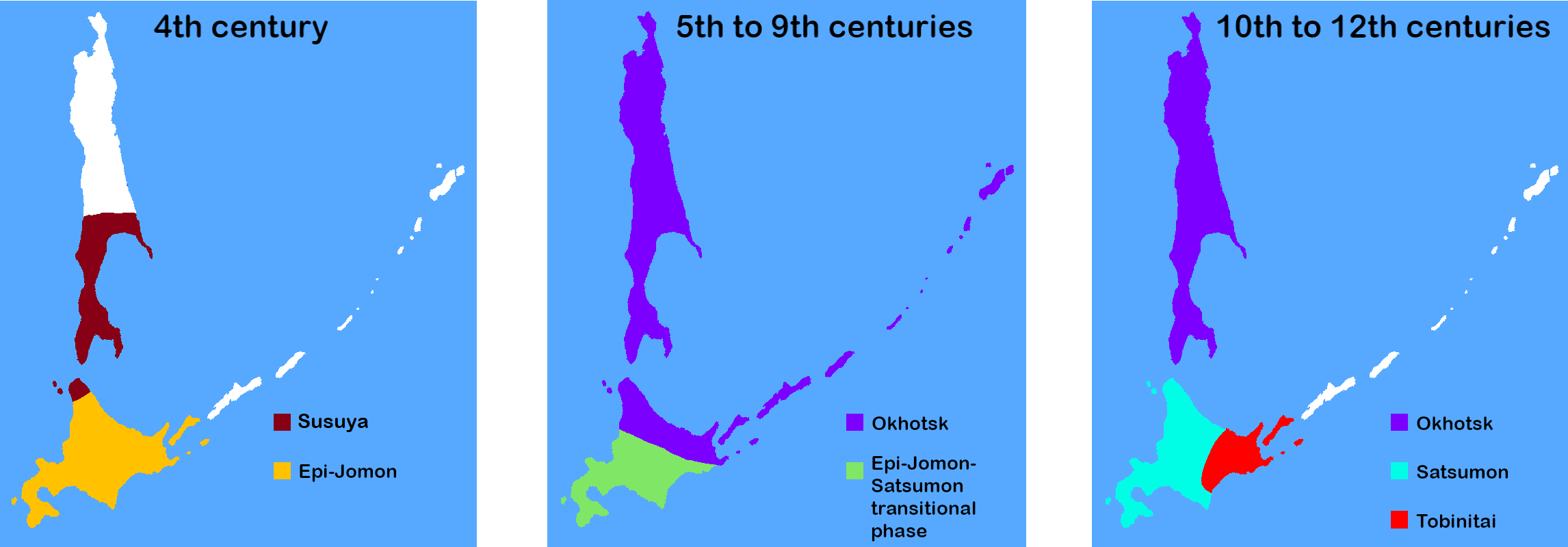
- Dates: 700 CE – 1200 CE
- Preceded by: Zoku-Jōmon period
- Followed by: Ainu people

The Satsumon culture (Japanese: 擦文文化, Hepburn: Satsumon Bunka; lit. 'brushed pattern culture') is a partially agricultural, archeological culture of northern Honshu and southern Hokkaido (700–1200) that has been identified as Emishi, as a Yamato-Emishi mixed culture, as the incipient modern Ainu, or with all three synonymously.

Scholars frequently equate the Satsumon culture with the Emishi, a people who emerged in northern Honshu as early as the 5th century, and with the ancestral Ainu. This proposition is based on similarities between Ainu and Emishi skeletal remains, as well as a number of place names across Honshu that resemble Ainu words. It is possible that the emergence of the Satsumon culture in Hokkaido was triggered by the immigration of Emishi from Honshu. However, there are many differences between Emishi and Satsumon. For instance, horse riding and rice agriculture, neither of which were present in ancient Hokkaido, were both central to Emishi lifestyle.

The Satsumon culture may have arisen from a merger of the Yayoi and subsequent Kofun cultures with the Jōmon culture. It appears to have spread from northeastern Honshu into southern Hokkaido. The Satsumon culture is regarded to be ancestral to the later Ainu culture, under some influence of the Okhotsk culture.

== Subsistence ==
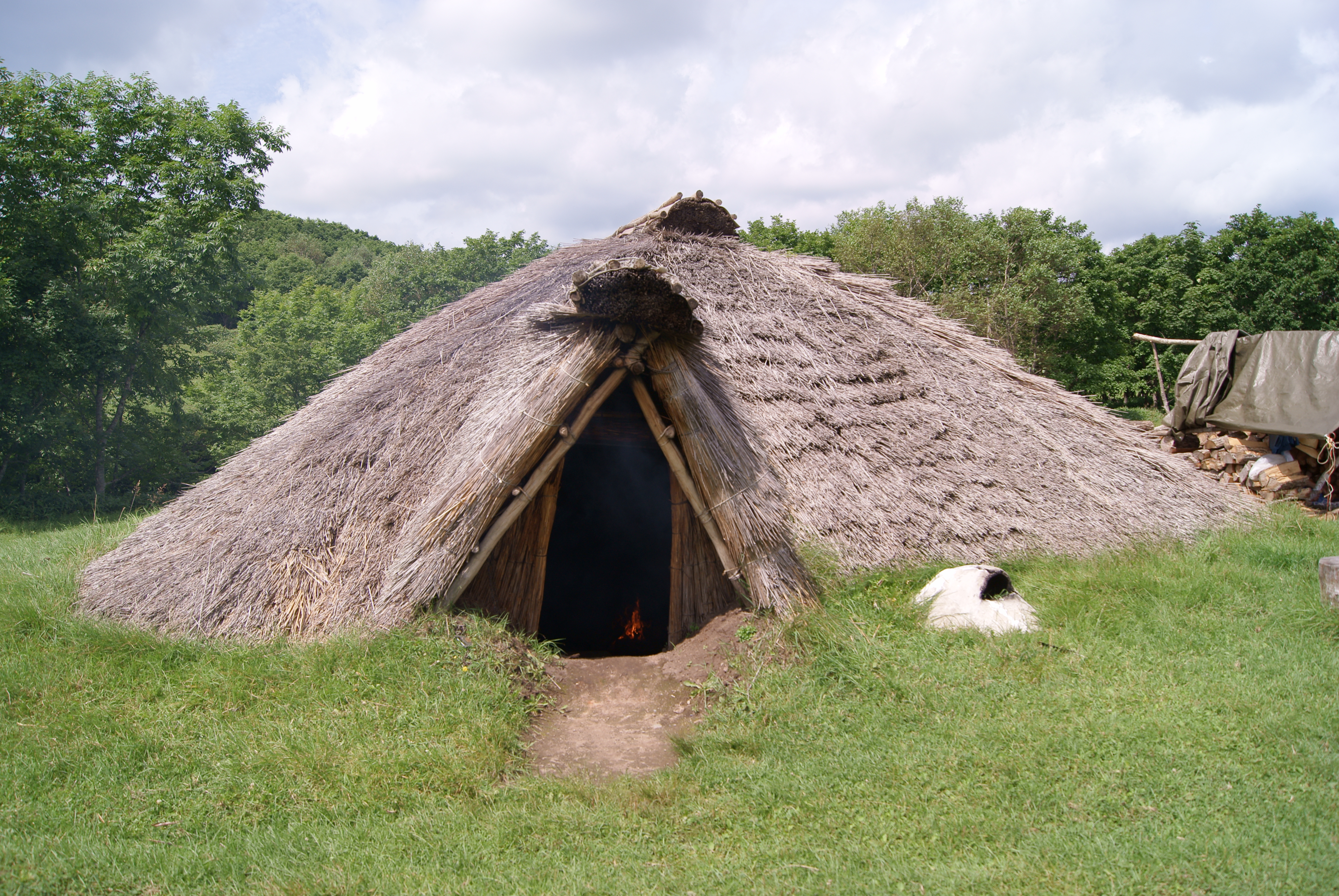
Dwelling replica from Hokuto at Kushiro, Hokkaido

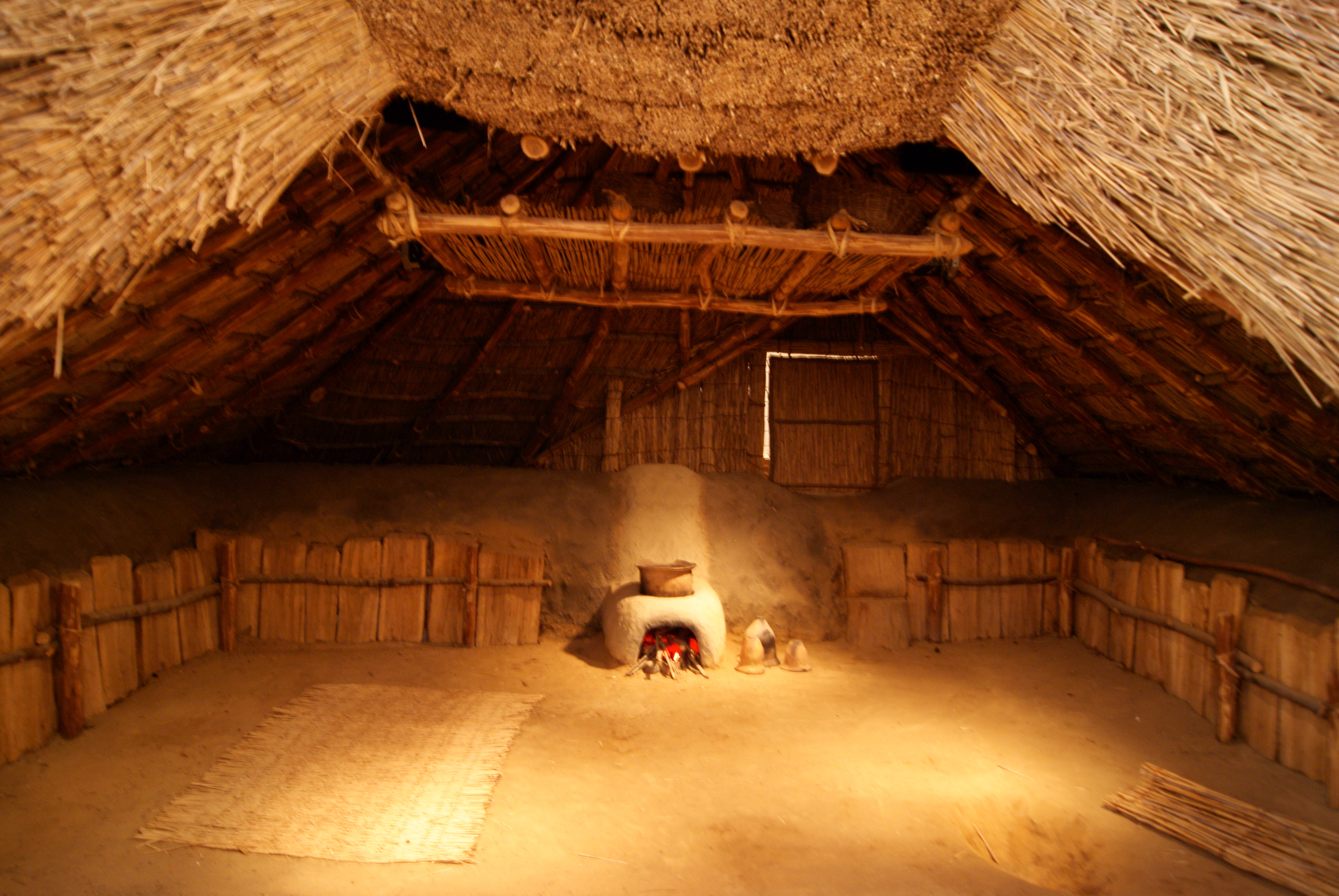
Hokuto, in Kushiro, Hokkaido

Iron tools seem to have prevailed around the end of Zoku-Jōmon period, so that stone tools disappeared in the Satsumon period. Among subsistence activities, hunting, gathering, and fishing remained the most important. Locations of large settlements at estuaries indicate the importance of salmon.

Although cultivation of buckwheat and barley is presumed for the Zoku-Jōmon, reliable evidence shows that the Satsumon additionally cultivated rice, wheat, sorghum, various types of millet, mung bean, perilla, melon, adzuki bean and hemp. Many of these plants were likely imported from mainland Asia. Opinions divide among those who, taking Satsumon culture as the periphery of the Kofun culture of the mainland, argue that such crops supplied a large portion of the diet, and those who think it provided only a small part and the culture was basically a continuation of the Epi-Jomon.

A study of pottery residue on Rebun Island sheds light on how the Satsumon culture adapted to a new environment. Unlike their mainland counterparts, who combined farming with hunting and gathering, the Satsumon people on Rebun Island appear to have relied more heavily on marine resources, such as fish and shellfish. This shift in subsistence strategy suggests that the island's ecosystem was not ideal for their established mixed farming and hunting practices. The focus on marine resources may also explain why the Satsumon presence on Rebun seems to have been relatively short-lived.

== Society ==
There is little evidence of social stratification in Satsumon settlements. The Satsumon society built kofun in a distinct style known as the "Hokkaido-type kofun". These are constructed later than, and on a smaller scale than, the kofun in the central area of Japan. It has been suggested that those buried in these kofun were immigrants from the Tōhoku region. These chiefs maintained relationships with the mainland government. Given the scale of these tombs, they may have been intended for the heads of Japanese clans.
