= List of historic sites of Japan (Hokkaido) =

This list is of the historic sites of Japan located within the circuit of Hokkaido.

== National Historic Sites ==
As of 1 February 2024, fifty-five Sites have been designated as being of national significance (including one *Special Historic Site).

Site	Municipality	Comments	Image	Coordinates	Type	Ref.
*Goryōkaku Site 五稜郭跡 Goryōkaku ato	Hakodate		Goryōkaku Site	41°47′49″N 140°45′25″E	2	7
Usakumai Sites ウサクマイ遺跡群 Usakumai iseki-gun	Chitose			42°49′06″N 141°34′31″E	2	58
Otafunbe Chashi Site オタフンベチャシ跡 Otafunbe chashi ato	Urahoro	Ainu hilltop fort or chashi; the name is derived from the Ainu terms for "sand" (ota) and "whale" (funbe)		42°49′32″N 143°50′34″E	2	61
Karinba Site カリンバ遺跡 Karinba iseki	Eniwa		Karinba Site	42°53′19″N 141°35′41″E	1	3413
Kiusu Earthwork Burial Circles キウス周堤墓群 Kiusu shūtei bogun	Chitose	inscribed on the UNESCO World Heritage List as one of the Jōmon Prehistoric Sites in Northern Japan	Kiusu Earthwork Burial Circles	42°53′09″N 141°42′59″E	1	60
Shibechari River Basin Chashi Sites - Appetsu Chashi Site シベチャリ川流域チャシ跡群及びアッペツチャシ跡 Shibechari-gawa ryūiki chashi ato-gun oyobi Appetsu chashi ato	Shinhidaka, Hidaka			42°19′46″N 142°22′21″E	2	3204
Pirika Site ピリカ遺跡 Pirika iseki	Imakane			42°28′36″N 140°12′17″E	1	75
Fugoppe Cave フゴッペ洞窟 Fugoppe dōkutsu	Yoichi	Zoku-Jōmon rock art: incised human figures, animals, and boats; excavated artefacts include earthenware and items made of stone, horn, and bone	Fugoppe Cave	43°11′41″N 140°50′17″E	1	35
Yukuepira Chashi Site ユクエピラチャシ跡 Yukuepira chashi ato	Rikubetsu			43°27′51″N 143°44′09″E	2	70
Otoe Stone Circle 音江環状列石 Otoe kanjō-resseki	Fukagawa			43°40′27″N 142°02′00″E	1	36
Hokkaidō Development Commission Headquarters Site・Former Hokkaidō Government Office 開拓使札幌本庁本庁舎跡および旧北海道庁本庁舎 Kaitakushi Sapporo honchō honchōsha ato oyobi kyū-Hokkaidō-chō honchōsha	Sapporo		Hokkaidō Development Commission Headquarters Site & Former Hokkaidō Government Office	43°03′50″N 141°20′54″E	2	41
Kakinoshima site 垣ノ島遺跡 Kakinoshima iseki	Hakodate	inscribed on the UNESCO World Heritage List as one of the Jōmon Prehistoric Sites in Northern Japan	Kakinoshima Site	41°55′44″N 140°56′51″E	1	00003697
Former Okuyuki Station Facilities 旧奥行臼駅逓所 kyū-Okuyuki-eki teisho	Betsukai	Meiji-Taisho period post station	Former Okuyuki Station Facilities	43°18′47″N 145°12′34″E	6	00003717
Former Shimoyoichi Unjōya 旧下ヨイチ運上家 kyū-Shimo-Yoichi unjō-ke	Yoichi	the ICP Matsumae Clan building of 1853 was renovated in 1891	Former Shimoyoichi Unjōya	43°11′52″N 140°47′18″E	6	47
Former Shimamatsu Station Site 旧島松駅逓所 kyū-Shimamatsu ekitei-sho	Kitahiroshima	former Matsumae Domain trading post	Former Shimamatsu Station	42°55′26″N 141°32′17″E	6	68
Former Yoichi Fukuhara Fishery 旧余市福原漁場 kyū-Yoichi Fukuhara gyoba	Yoichi	herring fishing facilities	Former Yochi Fukuhara Fishery	43°11′59″N 140°46′42″E	6	63
Former Rumoi Saga Family Fishery 旧留萌佐賀家漁場 kyū-Rumoi Saga-ke gyoba	Rumoi	herring fishing facilities	Former Rumoi Saga Family Fishery	43°54′49″N 141°37′03″E	6	77
Kotoni Tondenhei Residence 琴似屯田兵村兵屋跡 Kotoni tondenhei-son heioku ato	Sapporo	the tondenhei were former samurai recruited from 1874 as farmer-soldiers, to farm and potentially defend Hokkaidō	Kotoni Tondenhei Residence	43°54′49″N 141°37′03″E	2, 6	64
Katsuragaoka Chashi Site 桂ヶ岡砦跡 Katsuragaoka chashi ato	Abashiri		Katsuragaoka Chashi Site	44°01′04″N 144°16′12″E	1, 2	20
Ebetsu Kofun Cluster 江別古墳群 Ebetsu kofun-gun	Ebetsu		Ebetsu Kofun Cluster	43°07′01″N 141°30′57″E	1	3205
Kokutai-ji Site 国泰寺跡 Kokutaiji ato	Akkeshi	One of the 3 official temples of Ezo under the Tokugawa shogunate	Kokutaiji Site	43°01′50″N 144°50′15″E	3	48
Nemuro Peninsula Chashi Sites 根室半島チャシ跡群 Nemuro hantō chashi ato-gun	Nemuro		Nemuro Peninsula Chashi Sites	43°10′14″N 145°30′24″E	2	66
Moyoro Shell Mound 最寄貝塚 Moyoro kaizuka	Abashiri		Moyoro Shell Mound	44°01′31″N 144°16′05″E	1	22
Shiryōkaku 四稜郭 Shiryōkaku	Hakodate		Shiryōkaku	41°49′33″N 140°46′13″E	2	14
Shinori Castle ruins 志苔館跡 Shinori tate ato	Hakodate	destroyed in the Ainu uprisings of 1457 (Koshamain's War) and 1512	Shinoritate Castle ruins	41°45′56″N 140°49′20″E	2	16
Temiya Cave 手宮洞窟 Temiya dōkutsu	Otaru	incised rock art site published by John Milne in the Transactions of the Asiatic Society of Japan in 1879	Temiya Cave	43°12′45″N 141°00′13″E	1	1
Harutoridaichi Pit Dwellings 春採台地竪穴群 Harutoridaichi tateana-gun	Kushiro	Satsumon period settlement site		42°58′29″N 144°23′58″E	1	21
Tsuruoka Domain Hamamasu Jin'ya Site 庄内藩ハママシケ陣屋跡 Shōnai-han Hamamashike jinya ato	Ishikari			43°35′24″N 141°23′36″E	2	73
Matsumae clan Matsumae Clan Castle Sites 松前氏城跡 Matsumae-shi shiro ato	Matsumae, Assabu	designation includes the sites of Matsumae Castle (福山城跡) and Tate Castle (館城跡)	Matsumae Clan Castle Sites	41°25′48″N 140°06′29″E	2	17
Matsumae Domain Hekirichi Bastion Fort ruins 松前藩戸切地陣屋跡 Matsumae-han Hekirichi jinya ato	Hokuto	The first star-shaped Bastion fort built in Japan	Matsumae Han Hekirichi Jin'ya Site	41°51′14″N 140°37′09″E	2	38
Matsumae Domain Matsumae clan cemetery 松前藩主松前家墓所 Matsumae-han-shu Matsumae-ke bosho	Matsumae			41°25′53″N 140°06′21″E	7	62
Kaminokuni Castle ruins 上之国館跡 Kaminokuni tate ato	Kaminokuni	designation includes the sites of the Hanazawa (花沢館跡), Suzaki (洲崎館跡), and Katsuyama (勝山館跡) (pictured) castles	Kaminokuni Castle ruins	41°48′00″N 140°06′02″E	2	54
Tokoro Site 常呂遺跡 Tokoro iseki	Kitami			44°07′48″N 144°00′56″E	1	49
Nishitsukigaoka Site 西月ヶ岡遺跡 Nishitsukigaoka iseki	Nemuro			43°18′59″N 145°33′31″E	1	52
Shizugawa Site 静川遺跡 Shizugawa iseki	Tomakomai			42°40′37″N 141°49′06″E	1	69
Zenkō-ji Site 善光寺跡 Zenkōji ato	Date	One of the 3 official temples of Ezo under the Tokugawa shogunate	Zenkōji Site	42°31′15″N 140°46′48″E	3	50
Ō Castle ruins 大館跡 Ō tate ato	Matsumae			41°26′10″N 140°06′32″E	2	53
Ōfune Site 大船遺跡 Ōfune iseki	Hakodate	inscribed on the UNESCO World Heritage List as one of the Jōmon Prehistoric Sites in Northern Japan	Ōfune Site	41°57′29″N 140°55′27″E	1	3300
Ōyachi Shell Mound 大谷地貝塚 Ōyachi kaizuka	Yoichi			43°11′27″N 140°50′07″E	1	3270
East Ezo Nanbu Han East Ezo Nanbu Domain Jin'ya Sites 東蝦夷地南部藩陣屋跡 higashi Ezo-chi Nanbu-han jinya ato	Muroran, Oshamambe, Mori	designation includes the sites of the Mororan Jin'ya (モロラン陣屋跡), Oshamanbe Jin'ya (ヲシャマンベ陣屋跡), and Sunahara Jin'ya (砂原陣屋跡)		42°22′11″N 140°56′53″E	2	15
Higashi Kushiro Shell Mound 東釧路貝塚 Higashi Kushiro kaizuka	Kushiro	Jomon period shell mound and settlement traces		42°59′39″N 144°24′45″E	1	42
Irie-Takasago Shell Mounds 入江・高砂貝塚 Irie-Takasago kaizuka	Tōyako	inscribed on the UNESCO World Heritage List as two of the Jōmon Prehistoric Sites in Northern Japan	Irie-Takasago Shell Mounds	42°32′50″N 140°46′13″E	1	3333
Oshoro Stone Circle 忍路環状列石 Oshoro kanjō-resseki	Otaru		Oshoro Stone Circle	43°11′58″N 140°52′29″E	1	37
Shirataki Site 白滝遺跡群 Shirataki iseki	Engaru			43°52′28″N 143°08′00″E	1	74
Shiraoi Sendai Domain Shiraoi Sendai Domain Jin'ya Site 白老仙台藩陣屋跡 Shiraoi Sendai-han jinya ato	Shiraoi		Shiraoi Sendai Domain Jin'ya Site	42°33′47″N 141°20′34″E	2	39
Shibetsu Sites 標津遺跡群 Shibetsu iseki-gun	Shibetsu	designation includes the Ichanikarikariusu Site (伊茶仁カリカリウス遺跡), old road, and Sanbongi Site (三本木遺跡)		43°40′28″N 145°05′39″E	1	51
Kitakogane Shell Mound 北黄金貝塚 Kitakogane kaizuka	Date	inscribed on the UNESCO World Heritage List as one of the Jōmon Prehistoric Sites in Northern Japan	Kitakogane Shell Mound	42°24′07″N 140°54′38″E	1	71
Hokuto Site 北斗遺跡 Hokuto iseki	Kushiro		Hokuto Site	43°04′07″N 144°19′02″E	1	56
Mobetsu Castle ruins 茂別館跡 Mobetsu tate ato	Hokuto	Muromachi period fortification		41°46′13″N 140°36′15″E	2	65
Washinoki Site 鷲ノ木遺跡 Washinoki iseki	Mori		Washinoki Site	42°06′58″N 140°31′34″E	1	00003466
Cape Chashikotsu Upper Site チャシコツ岬上遺跡 Chashikotsu-misaki kami-iseki	Shari			44°04′05″N 144°58′39″E	1	00004055
Samani Mountain Trail 様似山道 Samani sandō	Samani			42°07′40″N 142°56′02″E	6	00004019
Saruru Mountain Trail 猿留山道 Saruru sandō	Erimo			42°00′58″N 143°08′56″E	6	00004020
Saruru Mountain Trail 猿留山道 Saruru sandō	Erimo			42°00′58″N 143°08′56″E	6	00004020
Kushiro River Basin Chashi Sites 釧路川流域チャシ跡群; Kushiro-gawa-ryūiki chashi ato-gun	Kushiro, Teshikaga, Shibecha, Kushiro	designation comprises the sites of Moshiriya Chashi (モシリヤチャシ跡) (pictured), Harutorucharanke Chashi (ハルトルチャランケチャシ跡), Urankoushi Chashi (ウランコウシチャシ跡), Kutcharoshipe Chashi 1・2 (クッチャロシペ第1・第2チャシ跡), Puirakuni Chashi (プイラクニチャシ跡), Shirarutoro Chashi 1 (シラルトロ第1チャシ跡), Shirarutoro Chashi 2 (シラルトロ第2チャシ跡), Matakotan Chashi (マタコタンチャシ跡), Tenneru Chashi 1 (テンネル第1チャシ跡) & Tapukopu Chashi (タプコプチャシ跡)		42°59′01″N 144°23′46″E		
Former Utasutsu Satō Family Fishery 旧歌棄佐藤家漁場 kyū-Utasutsu Satō-ke gyoba	Suttsu			42°47′20″N 140°18′36″E	6	00003927

== Prefectural Historic Sites ==
As of 1 May 2023, twenty-six Sites have been designated as being of prefectural importance.

Site	Municipality	Comments	Image	Coordinates	Type	Ref.
Kobui Blast Furnace Site 古武井熔鉱炉跡; Kobui yōkōro ato	Hakodate			41°47′38″N 141°05′56″E		for all refs see
Menagawa Brick Mill Site 女那川煉瓦製造所跡; Menagawa renga seizōjo ato	Hakodate			41°45′50″N 141°04′17″E		
Esan Shell Mound 恵山貝塚; Esan kaizuka	Hakodate			41°47′10″N 141°08′31″E		
Hokkaidō Development Commission Ippongi Triangulation Base 開拓史三角測量一本木基点; Kaitakushi sankaku-sokuryō-Ippongi kiten	Hokuto			41°50′10″N 140°39′43″E		
Aonae Dune Site 青苗砂丘遺跡; Aonae sakyū iseki	Okushiri			42°03′56″N 139°27′10″E		
Iwanai Higashiyama Cylinder Culture Site 岩内東山円筒文化遺跡; Iwanai Higashiyama entō bunka iseki	Iwanai			42°59′00″N 140°31′34″E		
Mount Jichin Stone Circle 地鎮山環状列石; Jichin-yama kanjō-resseki	Otaru			43°11′49″N 140°52′18″E		
Mount Nishizaki Stone Circle 西崎山環状列石; Nishizaki-yama kanjō-resseki	Yoichi			43°11′24″N 140°50′46″E		
Nokanan Burial Mounds 野花南周堤墓群; Nokanan shūtei bogun	Ashibetsu			43°28′08″N 142°16′06″E		
Kamui Kotan Pit Dwelling Site 神居古潭竪穴住居遺跡; Kamui Kotan tateana jūkyo iseki	Asahikawa			43°43′31″N 142°11′14″E		
Sōya Gokoku-ji Site 宗谷の護国寺跡; Sōya Gokokuji ato	Wakkanai			45°29′06″N 141°53′01″E		
Hamatonbetsu Lake Kutcharo Pit Group 浜頓別クッチャロ湖畔竪穴群; Hamatonbetsu Kutcharo-ko hotori tateana-gun	Hamatonbetsu			45°07′31″N 142°20′50″E		
Okoppe Toyono Pit Dwelling Site 興部豊野竪穴住居跡; Okoppe Toyono tateana jūkyo ato	Okoppe			44°27′35″N 143°10′02″E		
Shari Burial Mounds 斜里朱円周堤墓群; Shari shuen shūtei bogun	Shari			43°53′58″N 144°44′16″E		
Shari Pit Dwelling Sites 朱円竪穴住居跡群 shuen tateana jūkyo ato-gun	Shari			43°55′01″N 144°45′23″E		
Omusaro Plateau Pit Group オムサロ台地竪穴群; Omusaro daichi tateana-gun	Monbetsu			44°23′23″N 143°16′57″E		
Shibunotsunai Pit Dwelling Site シブノツナイ竪穴住居跡; Shibunotsunai tateana jūkyo ato	Yūbetsu			44°14′43″N 143°33′45″E		
Hokkaidō Development Commission Yūfutsu Triangulation Base 開拓使三角測量勇払基点; Kaitakushi sankaku-sokuryō Yūfutsu-kiten	Tomakomai			42°37′55″N 141°43′54″E		
Mukawa Tomb Cluster 鵡川盛土墳墓群; Mukawa moritsuchi funbo-gun	Mukawa			42°33′45″N 141°56′32″E		
Shizunai Mount Goten Tomb Cluster 静内御殿山墳墓群; Shizunai Goten-yama funbo-gun	Shinhidaka			42°22′09″N 142°23′37″E		
Monbetsu Tomihito Family Graves 門別富仁家噴墓群; Monbetsu Tomihito-ke funbo-gun	Hidaka			42°28′48″N 142°04′24″E		
Urahoro Shinyoshino Plateau Stone Tool Site 浦幌新吉野台細石器遺跡; Urahoro Shinyoshino-dai hoso-sekki iseki	Urahoro			42°46′07″N 143°37′24″E		
Tokachi Okoppe Site 十勝オコッペ遺跡; Tokachi Okoppe iseki	Urahoro			42°47′02″N 143°47′10″E		
Tokachi Buto Sites 十勝太遺跡群; Tokachi Buto iseki-gun	Urahoro			42°45′40″N 143°41′08″E		
Tokachi Horokayantō Pit Group 十勝ホロカヤントー竪穴群; Tokachi Horokayantō tateana-gun	Taiki			42°32′40″N 143°29′26″E		
Akkeshi Kamuiwa Chashi and Pit Group 厚岸神岩砦跡及び竪穴群; Akkeshi Kamuiwa chashi ato oyobi tateana-gun	Akkeshi			43°04′09″N 144°52′57″E		

== Municipal Historic Sites ==
As of 1 May 2023, a further one hundred and seventy-six Sites have been designated as being of municipal importance.

== See also ==
- Cultural Property (Japan)
- List of Places of Scenic Beauty of Japan (Hokkaido)
- List of Cultural Properties of Japan - paintings (Hokkaidō)
- List of Cultural Properties of Japan - historical materials (Hokkaidō)
- Hokkaido Museum
