= Hotsuma Tsutae =

Japanese poem

The HOTSUMATUTAYE (ホツマツタヱ, Hotumatutaye). Original source by Yasutoshi Waniko 1775.

The AWAUTA (あわうた, awauta). Reference to the "Hotsuma Tsutae"(Manuscripts to OGASAWARA Nagahiro (小笠原長弘, ogasawara nagahiro) March 3, 1900) Establishment kana to right of the character(WOSITE jindai moji)hotsuma.gr.jp awa-no-uta).

The MOTOAKE (もとあけ, motoake). The FUTOMANI (フトマニ, futomani) Divination Chart(Manuscripts to OGASAWARA Nagatake (小笠原長武, ogasawara nagatake)) Establishment kanji to down of the character(WOSITE jindai moji)Hotsuma-Tsutae Futomani).

The Hotsuma Tsutae (also Hotuma Tsutaye, Japanese 秀真伝) is an elaborate epic poem of Japanese legendary history. It differs substantially from the mainstream version as recorded in the Kojiki and the Nihon Shoki, and its antiquity is undetermined.

Although many proponents allege that the Hotsuma predates mainstream mythology, the first known manuscript was dedicated to a shrine by Waniko Yasutoshi (also known as Yunoshin Ibo) in 1775. Some excerpts were published and translated into modern Japanese in 1884, a printing which was noted by Hirata Atsutane in his work on jindai moji, a Japanese writing system developed prior to the use of Chinese characters, but which otherwise ignored the work. Atsutane's Kokugaku was principally concerned with the Kojiki and the Hotsuma Tsutae would have only muddled his theories. Yasutoshi's manuscript was almost lost, but was discovered and rescued in 1993 following the publication of some popular books on the subject in the mid-20th century by Yoshinosuke Matsumoto.

The Hotsuma Tsutae is known for its text and rhythm. It was written in yamato-kotoba, which only uses a Japanese vocabulary which predates contact with China. Some of the yamato-kotoba used in Hotsuma Tsutae are unattested elsewhere in the Old Japanese corpus but have parallels to old words. Meaning that if it is a late medieval hoax, it is extremely elaborate. Among other things in its primarily historical and non-mythological record, the text discusses the births, lives, and deaths of kami from Japanese folk shrines and history; in this case, the word kami is being used to mean something like royalty and not "gods". In the poem, Amaterasu, the sun kami of Shinto, is male, and not female as is written in the official records. Matsumoto theorizes that Amaterasu was feminized in the Kojiki and Nihon Shoki to provide a justification for the reign of Empress Suiko who reigned just before those documents were written.

Although for the most part Japanese academics remain uninterested in this text, some scholars are of the opinion that it may have been written in the Edo period. This is due to claims that the text was written in an original Japanese writing system - in academic circles, the existence of writing in Japan before the use of Chinese characters is denied. Also, the allegedly pre-Chinese Japanese writing system does not match the Old Japanese phonology but rather the phonologies of later stages of Japanese. The general opinion is that it is a false document. However, no definitive conclusion has yet been reached.
