= Shimoyoichi Unjōya =

- 旧下ヨイチ運上家 (Japanese)
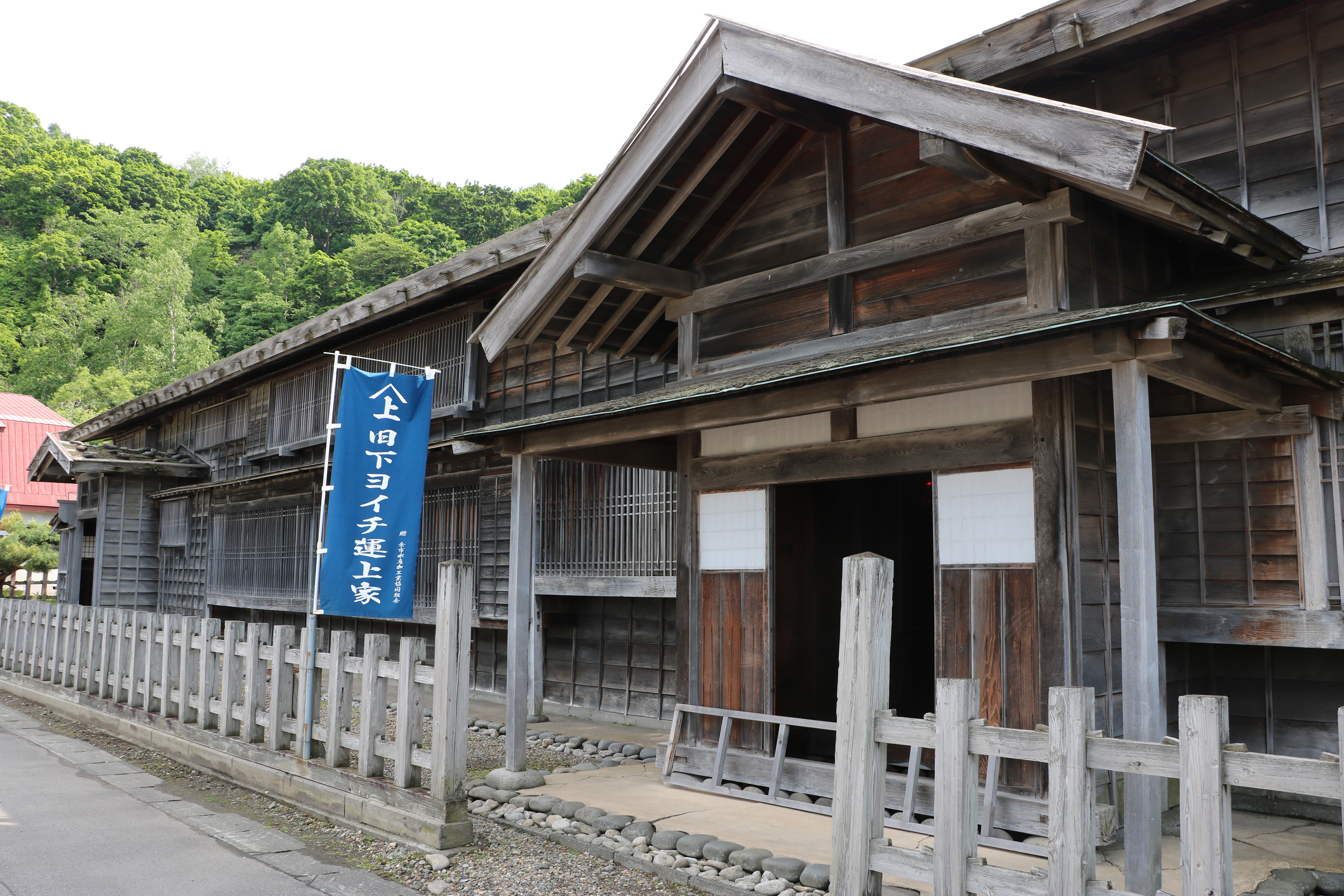
- Shimoyoichi Unjōya

- Shimoyoichi Unjōya Shimoyoichi Unjōya (Japan)
- Interactive map of Shimoyoichi Unjōya
- 43°11′52.3″N 140°47′17.2″E
- Type: industrial site
- Periods: Edo period - Showa period
- Location: Yoichi, Hokkaido, Japan
- Region: Hokkaido

Site notes
- Public access: Yes (museum)
- Important Cultural Property National Historic Site of Japan

The Shimoyoichi Unjōya (旧下ヨイチ運上家) was a trading post established in the Edo period by Matsumae Domain in the Irifune neighborhood of the town of Yoichi, Hokkaidō. The building was designated an Important Cultural Property in 1971 and surrounding grounds were designated a National Historic Site of Japan in 1973.

== Overview ==
Unjoya were facilities established by site contractors and served as places for trade between Japanese and Ainu people in Ezo. A merchant was contracted to act as a trading agent for the daimyō of Matsumae, and a manager, interpreter, bookkeeper, and guard were stationed at the unjoya. Handicrafts or seafood caught by the Ainu were traded for rice, sake, salt, knives, and other items. The merchant contractors initially traded primarily with the Ainu. However, as the number of Japanese settlers increased, they began to employ the Ainu and operate large-scale fishing businesses themselves. The unjoya eventually became the economic and administrative centers for the area. The system continued until the early Meiji period, and although the number of unjoya varied by era, it numbered in the dozens to hundreds. The existence of Shimoyoichi unjoya has been confirmed as early as the 18th century, and it is the only structure to have survived to the present day. The building has a gabled roof with a flat entrance. It measures 20 bays (approximately 40 meters) wide at the front and nine bays (approximately 16 meters) deep. The total floor area, including the attached building, is approximately 540 square meters. It has an oak-shingled, stone-roofed roof. The windows are latticed, with some paper shōji screens. Reflecting the feudal class system, the building includes an upper room with a tokonoma alcove, a room for the samurai on duty, a wooden-paneled room for servants near the entrance, and upper and lower kitchens.

While the construction date is unknown, the Hayashi family has retained blueprints from when the site was renovated in 1853 by site contractor Hayashi Chozaemon (under the trade name "Yamajo" Takeya). These blueprints were passed down to the Hayashi family, and the building was restored to its current state in December 1979 based on these blueprints. Many unjoya were converted into fisheries guardhouses or warehouses after the Meiji period. The coastal waters off Hokkaido's Sea of Japan coast, including Esashi, Suttsu, Yoichi, and Rumoi were major fishing grounds since the Edo period. As herring fishing declined, the converted unjoya lost their function and were left to decay. The Shimoyoichi unjoya followed a similar path, once housing several families as rented houses. Around 1965, the Hayashi family donated the house to Yoichi Town. While many articles refer to it as a "herring palace", the unjoya was not constructed as such.

The beach in front of the unjoya was a narrow sandy beach and rocky reef, making it an ideal spawning ground for herring and a habitat for sea cucumbers (which were harvested as a monopoly product of Matsumae Domain. The reason for the establishment at this site is likely due to its strategic location, serving as a checkpoint for those traveling from Shakotan to Otaru. However, at present the foreshore has been dredged and turned into a yacht harbor, leaving no trace of its appearance. An Ainu Kotan was located on the opposite bank near the river mouth, where salmon and trout fishing continued until the Taisho period. In 1784, the tax on the Shimoyoichi area was 160 ryō, making it one of the most important fishing areas among the 80 or so contracted fishing areas. However, toward the end of the Meiji period, new herring fishing techniques were developed (shifting from gill nets to fixed nets), and prosperity shifted to the Hamanaka neighborhood of Yoichi, with its wider foreshore (see Former Yoichi Fukuhara Fishery).

== See also ==
- List of Historic Sites of Japan (Hokkaidō)
