= Fugoppe Cave =

Rock art site in Japan

- フゴッペ洞窟 (Japanese)
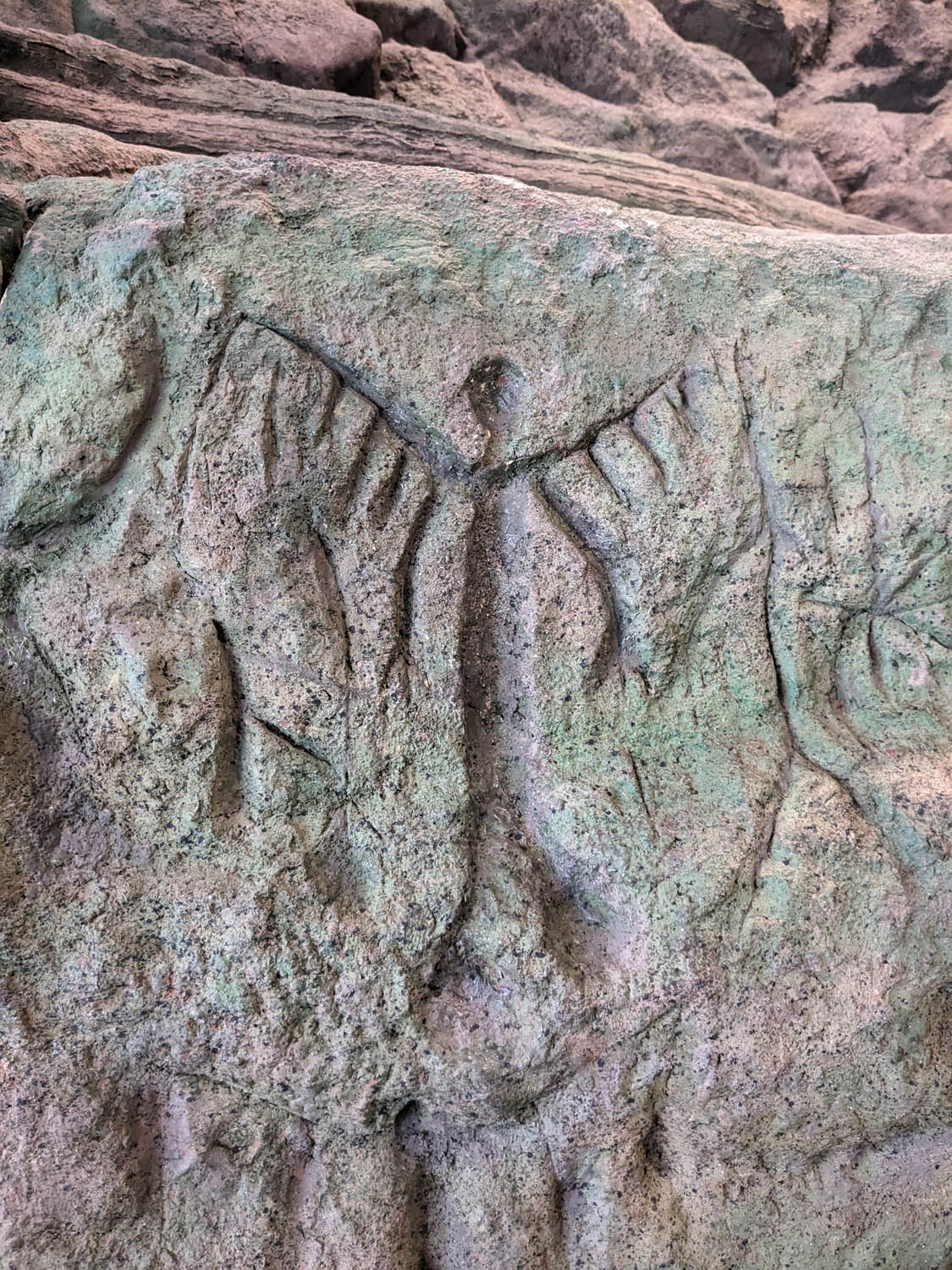
- Reconstruction of the Fugoppe Cave wall, a winged figure

- Fugoppe Cave Fugoppe Cave (Japan)
- 43°11′41″N 140°50′17″E
- Type: petroglyphs
- Periods: Zoku-Jōmon period
- Location: Yoichi, Hokkaidō, Japan
- Region: Hokkaidō

History
- Built: c.100-400 AD

Site notes
- Excavation dates: 1951-1952
- Public access: Yes
- National Historic Site of Japan

The Fugoppe Cave (フゴッペ洞窟, Fugoppe dōkutsu) is an archaeological site in the Sakae-chō neighborhood of the town of Yoichi, Hokkaidō, Japan, with Zoku-Jōmon period (approximately 1,500 to 2,000 years ago) petroglyphs. It is one of only two known to exist among the more than 700 cave sites in the Japanese archipelago, along with the Temiya Cave in nearby Otaru. The cave was designated a National Historic Site of Japan in 1951. "Fugoppe" is the name of the former village where the cave is located.

== Overview ==
The Fugoppe Cave is a rock shelter on the east side of a small sandstone hill known as Mt. Maruyama, 200 meters from the coast. The cave has an entrance approximately 4 meters wide, 5 meters high, and 5 meters deep. The site was discovered by local high school students in 1950, and formal archaeological excavations were conducted in 1951 and 1953. Its west, north, and south interior walls are covered with carvings, featuring what appear to be boats, fish, sea creatures, four-legged animals, and people disguised with horns and wings. Other images include dotted lines, which are believed to have a magical nature. Initially, only around 200 drawings were identified, but nearly 800 have since been confirmed. The cave contains a layer of rock containing artifacts approximately seven meters thick, from which thin-handled Zoku-Jōmon period pottery, stone tools, and bone and horn tools have been excavated. The site has been dated to between 100 and 400 A.D., based on these artifacts and geological data. The cave itself is made of soft hyaloclastite, which is why the figures could be carved by abrasion and then polished.

Since 1972, the petroglyphs have been preserved and exhibited in a capsule-style facility and are open to the public.

== See also ==
- List of Historic Sites of Japan (Hokkaidō)
- Hokkaido characters
