= Shibecha, Hokkaido =

Shibecha 標茶町 Shibecha-chō
- Town
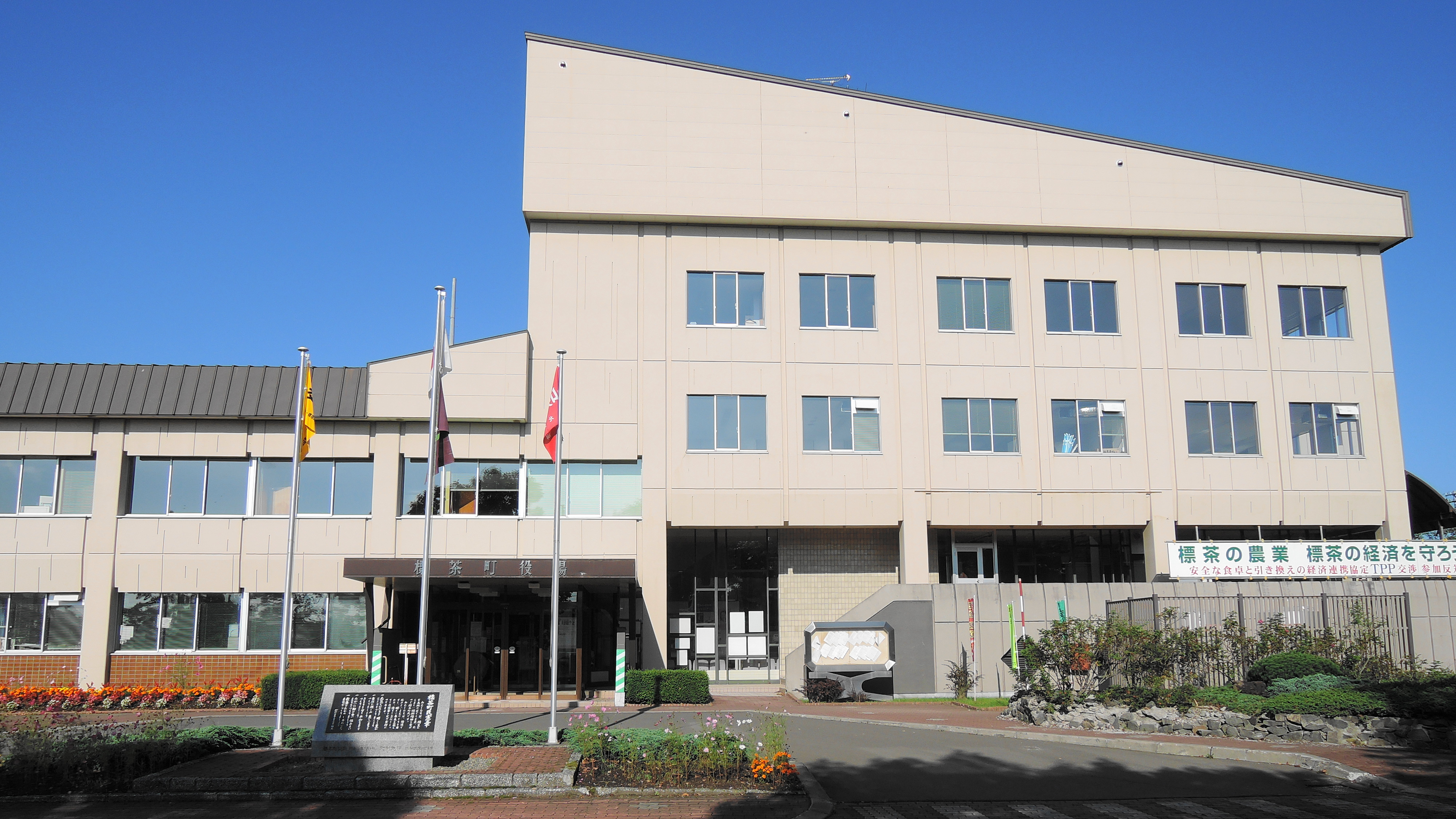
- Shibecha town hall

- Flag Emblem

- Location of Shibecha in Hokkaido (Kushiro Subprefecture)
- Interactive map of Shibecha
- Location within Japan
- Coordinates: 43°04′34″N 145°07′53″E
- Country: Japan
- Region: Hokkaido
- Prefecture: Hokkaido (Kushiro Subprefecture)
- District: Kawakami

Area
  - Total: 1,099.37 km^{2} (424.47 sq mi)

Population (November 31, 2025)
  - Total: 6,713
  - Density: 6.106/km^{2} (15.82/sq mi)
- Time zone: UTC+09:00 (JST)
- City hall address: 2-4 Kawakami, Shibecha-cho, Kawakami-gun, Hokkaido 088-2312
- Climate: Dfb
- Website: www.town.shibecha.hokkaido.jp
- Symbols
- Flower: Cosmos
- Tree: Nara Oak

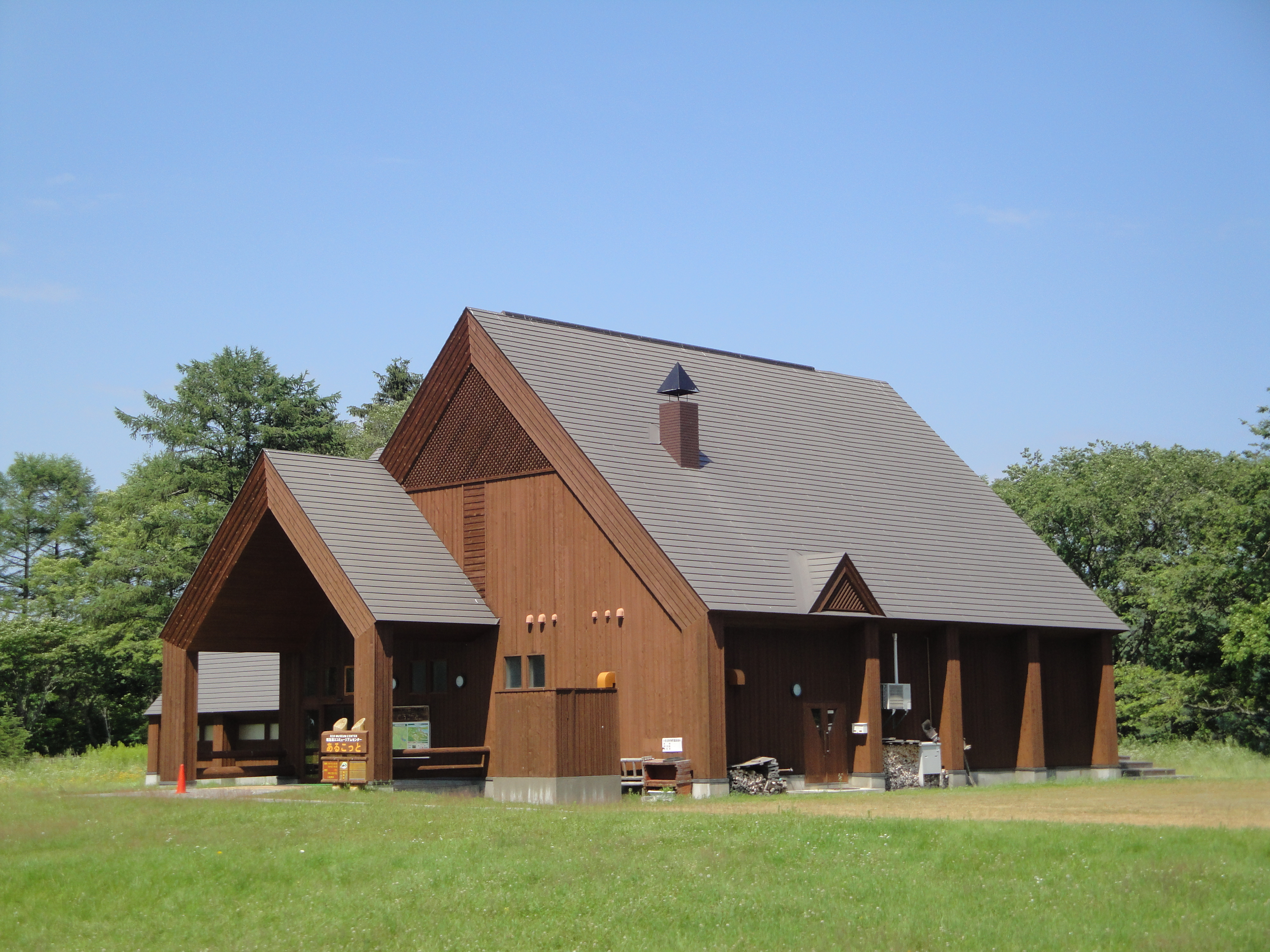
Tōro Eco Museum

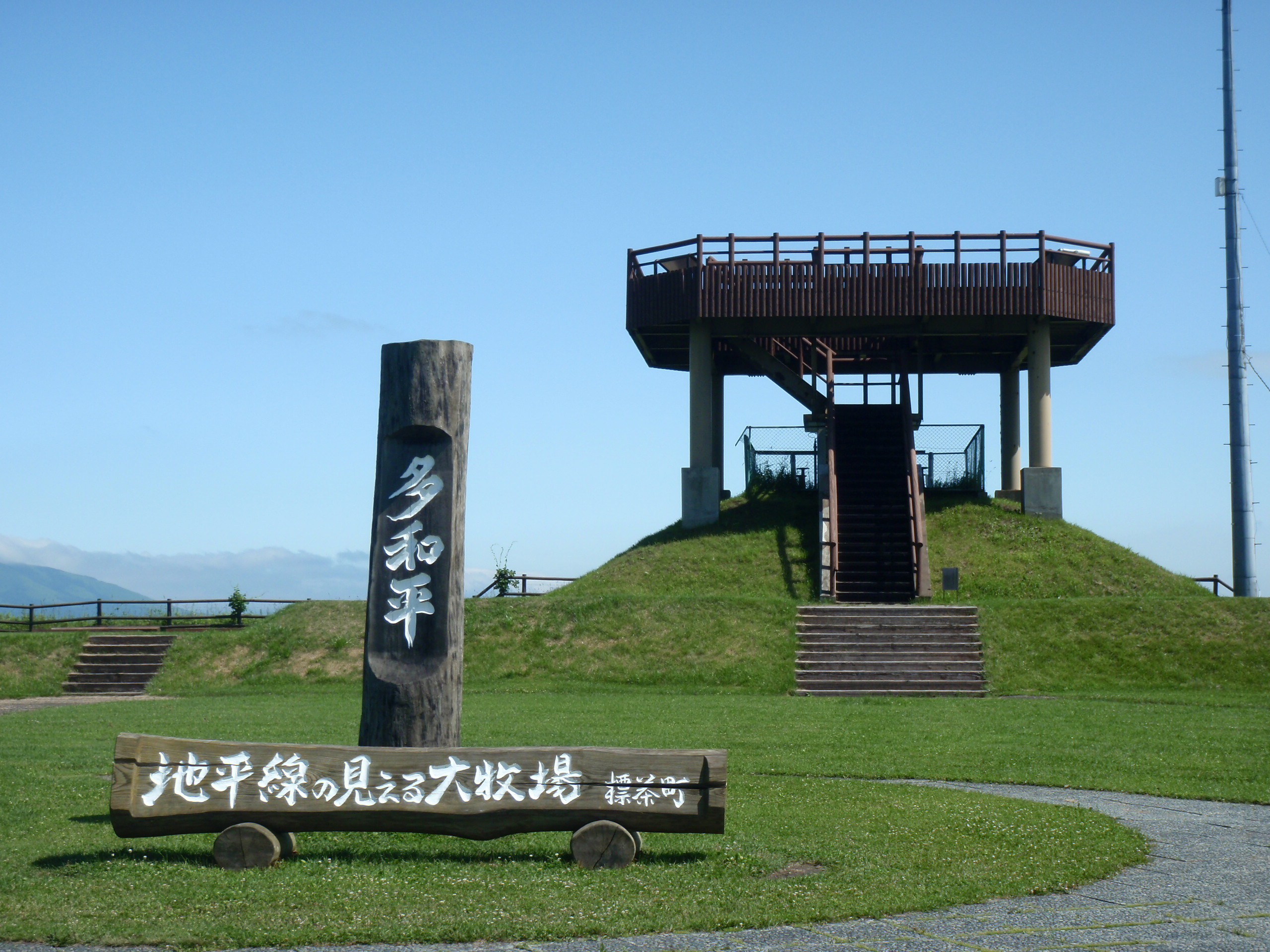
Tawadaira

Shibecha (標茶町, Shibecha-chō) is a town located in Kushiro Subprefecture, Hokkaidō, Japan. As of 30 November 2025, the town had an estimated population of 6,713 in 3560 households, and a population density of 10.9 people per km^{2}. The total area of the town is 1,099.37 km^{2} (424.47 sq mi).

== Geography ==
Shibecha is located approximately in the center of Kushiro Subprefecture. It is approximately 40 kilometers northeast of central Kushiro. It the sixth largest town and village in Japan in terms of geographical area. The Kushiro River flows north and south through the town. The Kushiro Wetlands are located in the south. Nishibetsudake, at 800 meters, is the highest point in the town.

=== Neighboring municipalities ===
  - Kushiro
  - Tsurui
  - Teshikaga
  - Akkeshi
  - Nakashibetsu
  - Betsukai

=== Climate ===
According to the Köppen climate classification, Shibecha has a humid continental climate. The area is cool from spring to early summer, but in summer, despite the short hours of daylight, temperatures can reach a maximum of 30 °C. Autumn is relatively sunny, but in late autumn, early mornings can get very chilly. Winter is bitterly cold, with temperatures of around -25 °C often observed.

標茶町

Climate chart (precipitation, max. and min. temperature)
J	F	M	A	M	J	J	A	S	O	N	D
43 −2 −15	28 −2 −15	59 2 −9	74 9 −2	98 15 3	88 18 8	111 21 13	132 23 15	155 20 10	111 15 2	80 8 −5	51 1 −10
- █ Average max. and min. temperatures in °C
- █ Precipitation totals in mm
Imperial conversion
J	F	M	A	M	J	J	A	S	O	N	D
1.7 28 4	1.1 29 6	2.3 36 16	2.9 48 28	3.9 59 37	3.5 64 47	4.4 70 55	5.2 73 58	6.1 68 50	4.4 59 36	3.1 46 24	2 34 13
- █ Average max. and min. temperatures in °F
- █ Precipitation totals in inches

Climate data for Shibecha（1991 - 2020）
Month	Jan	Feb	Mar	Apr	May	Jun	Jul	Aug	Sep	Oct	Nov	Dec	Year
Record high °C (°F)	7.8 (46.0)	12.4 (54.3)	17.0 (62.6)	27.5 (81.5)	32.8 (91.0)	32.7 (90.9)	35.2 (95.4)	35.1 (95.2)	31.7 (89.1)	25.7 (78.3)	21.0 (69.8)	14.1 (57.4)	35.2 (95.4)
Mean daily maximum °C (°F)	−1.4 (29.5)	−0.9 (30.4)	3.2 (37.8)	9.8 (49.6)	15.6 (60.1)	18.8 (65.8)	22.0 (71.6)	23.5 (74.3)	20.8 (69.4)	15.5 (59.9)	8.5 (47.3)	1.3 (34.3)	11.4 (52.5)
Daily mean °C (°F)	−7.9 (17.8)	−7.1 (19.2)	−2.1 (28.2)	3.6 (38.5)	9.0 (48.2)	13.0 (55.4)	16.9 (62.4)	18.4 (65.1)	15.3 (59.5)	8.9 (48.0)	2.0 (35.6)	−5.2 (22.6)	5.4 (41.7)
Mean daily minimum °C (°F)	−15.2 (4.6)	−14.7 (5.5)	−8.1 (17.4)	−2.3 (27.9)	3.1 (37.6)	8.4 (47.1)	13.0 (55.4)	14.6 (58.3)	10.2 (50.4)	2.3 (36.1)	−4.4 (24.1)	−12.1 (10.2)	−0.4 (31.3)
Record low °C (°F)	−29.5 (−21.1)	−29.4 (−20.9)	−24.3 (−11.7)	−14.6 (5.7)	−7.1 (19.2)	−2.8 (27.0)	2.6 (36.7)	3.5 (38.3)	−1.7 (28.9)	−8.3 (17.1)	−16.2 (2.8)	−26.0 (−14.8)	−29.5 (−21.1)
Average precipitation mm (inches)	35.4 (1.39)	22.8 (0.90)	49.3 (1.94)	76.3 (3.00)	105.7 (4.16)	97.2 (3.83)	119.1 (4.69)	158.8 (6.25)	152.9 (6.02)	111.0 (4.37)	70.7 (2.78)	56.0 (2.20)	1,054.9 (41.53)
Average snowfall cm (inches)	86 (34)	70 (28)	73 (29)	31 (12)	0 (0)	0 (0)	0 (0)	0 (0)	0 (0)	0 (0)	8 (3.1)	69 (27)	338 (133)
Average precipitation days (≥ 1.0 mm)	5.8	5.1	7.4	9.4	10.7	9.9	11.2	11.8	11.7	9.7	8.5	7.2	106.6
Mean monthly sunshine hours	149.8	152.3	171.6	160.2	161.4	131.4	108.4	112.3	128.7	152.4	145.5	145.1	1,719
Source 1: Japan Meteorological Agency
Source 2: JMA

=== Demographics ===
Per Japanese census data, The total area is 1,099.41 km^{2}. the population of Shibecha has declined in recent decades.

Historical population
Year	Pop.	±%
1970	13,832	—
1980	12,297	−11.1%
1990	10,701	−13.0%
2000	9,388	−12.3%
2010	8,278	−11.8%
2020	7,230	−12.7%

== History ==
More than 200 prehistoric ruins have been identified within the town limits, indicating that people have lived here since the Jōmon period. Records by Matsuura Takeshiro and others indicate that Ainu people lived in settlements in Tōro and Nishibetsu during the Edo period. The name comes from the Ainu language name for the area where the current town is located, "Sipetcha" (si-pet-cha) (large, river, bank).

The Kushiro Penal Colony, the predecessor to Abashiri Prison, opened in 1885. The town was also home to a county office, a headman's office, and a branch office of the Bank of Japan, and at one time rivaled the size of Kushiro. At its peak, the number of prisoners serving sentences reached nearly 2,000, and they were involved in projects such as building the Kushiro-Abashiri road, constructing the Kushiro Railway, and mining sulfur at Atosanupuri (Ioyama) in Kawayu. In 1887, Hokkaido's second railway was built between Shibecha and Ioyama to transport sulfur from Ioyama. Sulfur was transshipped in Shibecha and then transported by water to Kushiro, but over mining led to resource depletion and mining was discontinued within nine years.

In 1901, Kushiro Penal Colony was abolished, and its functions were transferred to Abashiri. The population plummeted, partly due to the separation of Teshikaga Village in 1903, but the town regained its vitality with the establishment of the Military Horse Replacement Unit on the former penal colony site in 1908. Kumaushi Village (熊牛村) was formed in 1923; it was renamed Shibecha in 1929. The War Horse Replacement Unit was abolished in 1945, and part of the grounds and buildings were converted into Shibecha High School, which opened shortly after the war, while the remaining grounds were converted into farmland and other uses. The large size of Shibecha High School's grounds is due to these historical circumstances. Shibecha was raised to town status on November 1, 1950. In 1953 a large fire in front of Shibecha Station destroyed 104 houses.

== Government ==
Shibecha has a mayor-council form of government with a directly elected mayor and a unicameral town council of 13 members. Shibecha, as part of Kushiro Subprefecture, contributes one member to the Hokkaidō Prefectural Assembly. In terms of national politics, the town is part of the Hokkaidō 7th district of the lower house of the Diet of Japan.

== Economy ==
The main industry of Shibecha is dairy farming. While the number of farm households has been decreasing year by year, the number of dairy cows has been increasing and dairy farms are becoming larger in scale. In recent years, tourism development has progressed, centered on Lake Tōro in the south, and the Kushiro Shitsugen Norokko trolley train on the Senmo Main Line operates between Kushiro Station and Tōro Station. Canoeing is available on Lake Tōro, and in winter, the Steam Locomotive Winter Wetlands operates between Kushiro Station and Shibecha Station.

== Education ==
Shibecha has four public elementary schools, two public middle schools, two public combined elementary/middle schools and one public high school. Kyoto University's Faculty of Agriculture Experimental Forest is located in Shibetsu.

== Transportation ==
JR Hokkaido - Senmō Main Line

■ Isobunnai - Shibecha - Kayanuma - Tōro

=== Highways ===
- National Route 243
- National Route 272
- National Route 274
- National Route 391

== Local attractions ==
- Lake Tōro
- Kushiro Wetlands
- Hokuto Site, National Historic Site

== Noted residents of Shibetsu ==
- Nobukatsu Fujioka, revisionist educator
- Keiko Takahashi, actress
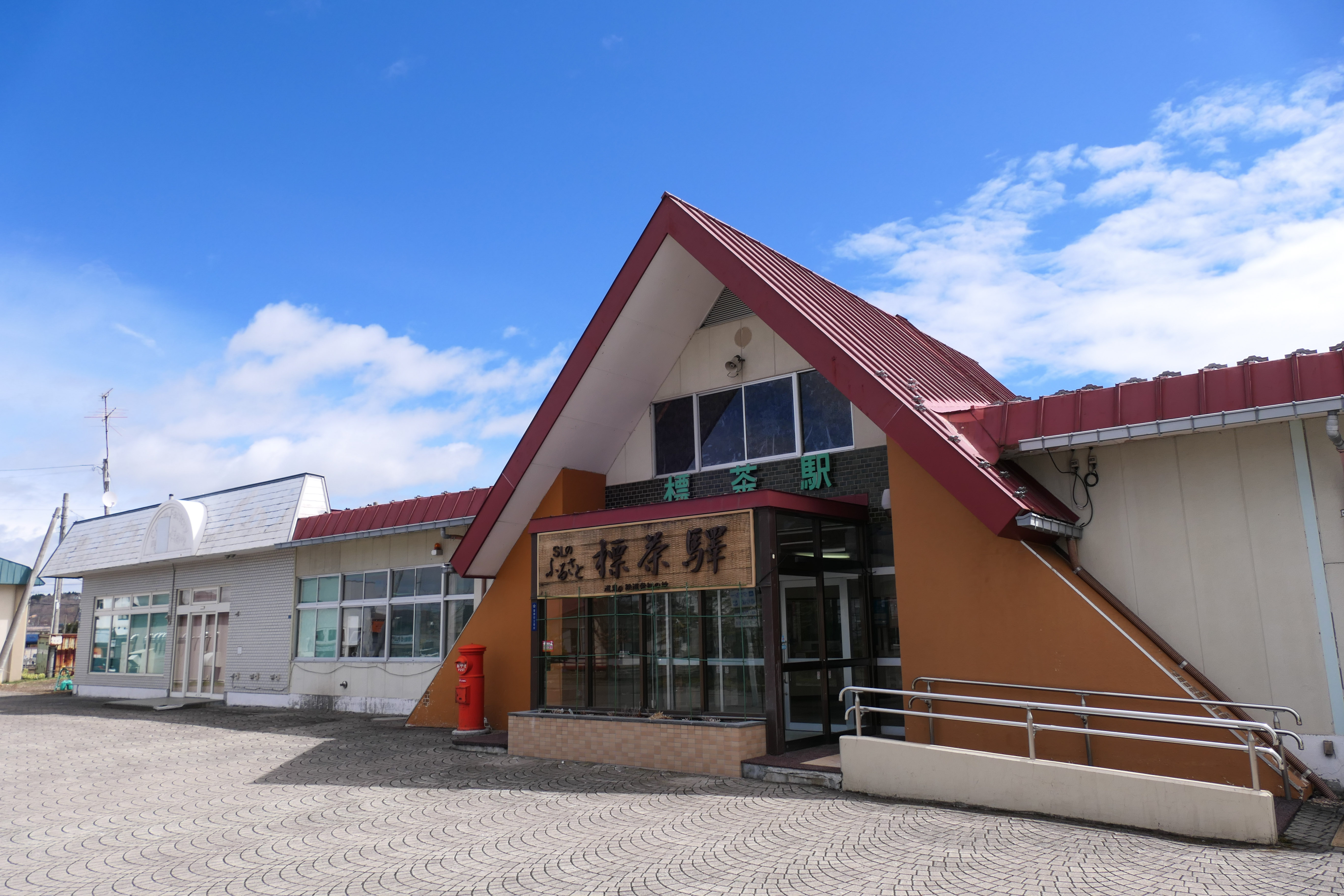
Shibecha railway station

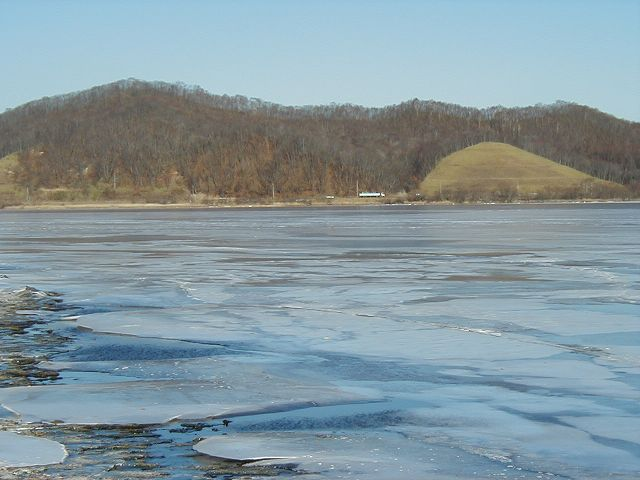
Lake Tōro

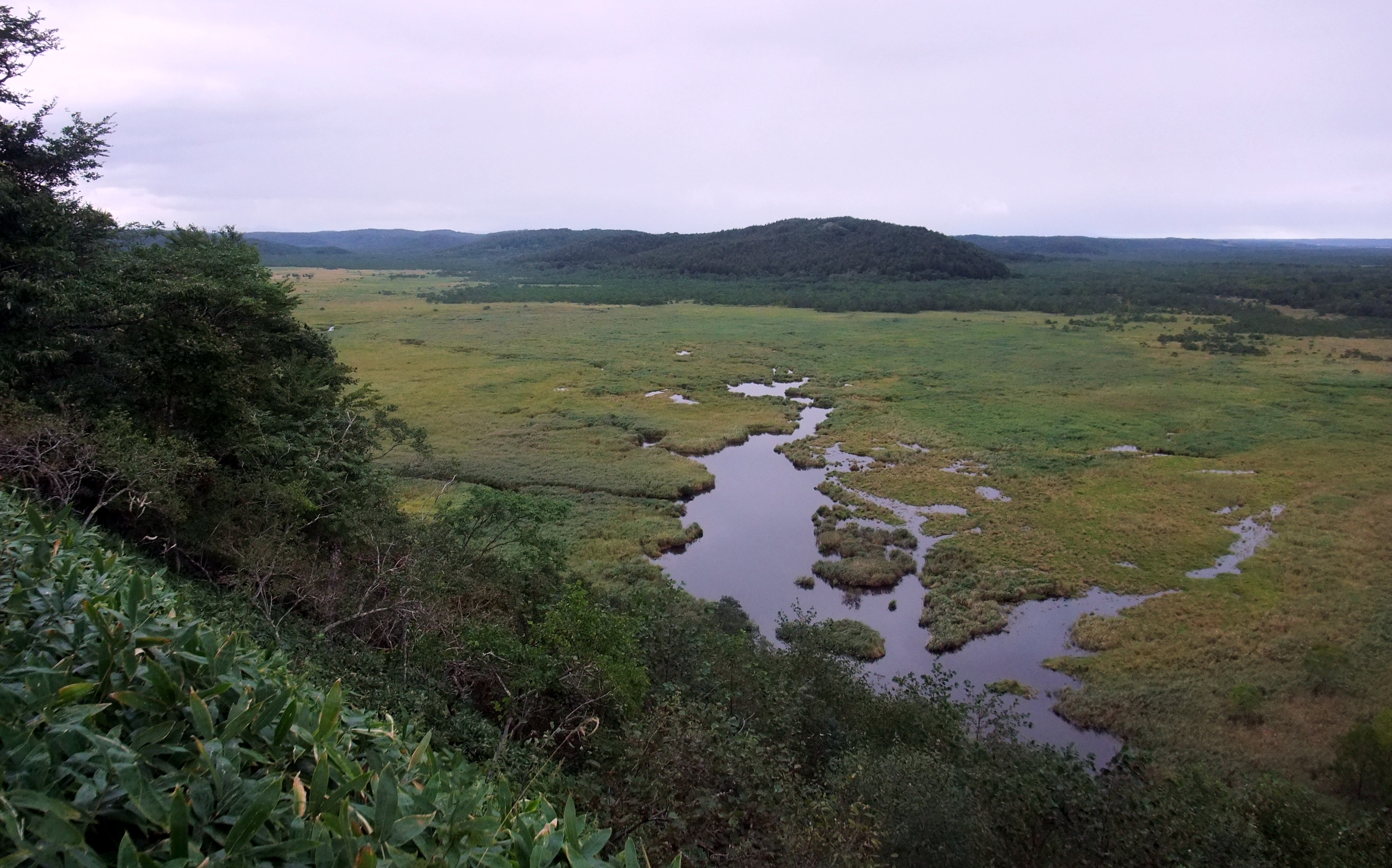
Kottaro wetlands

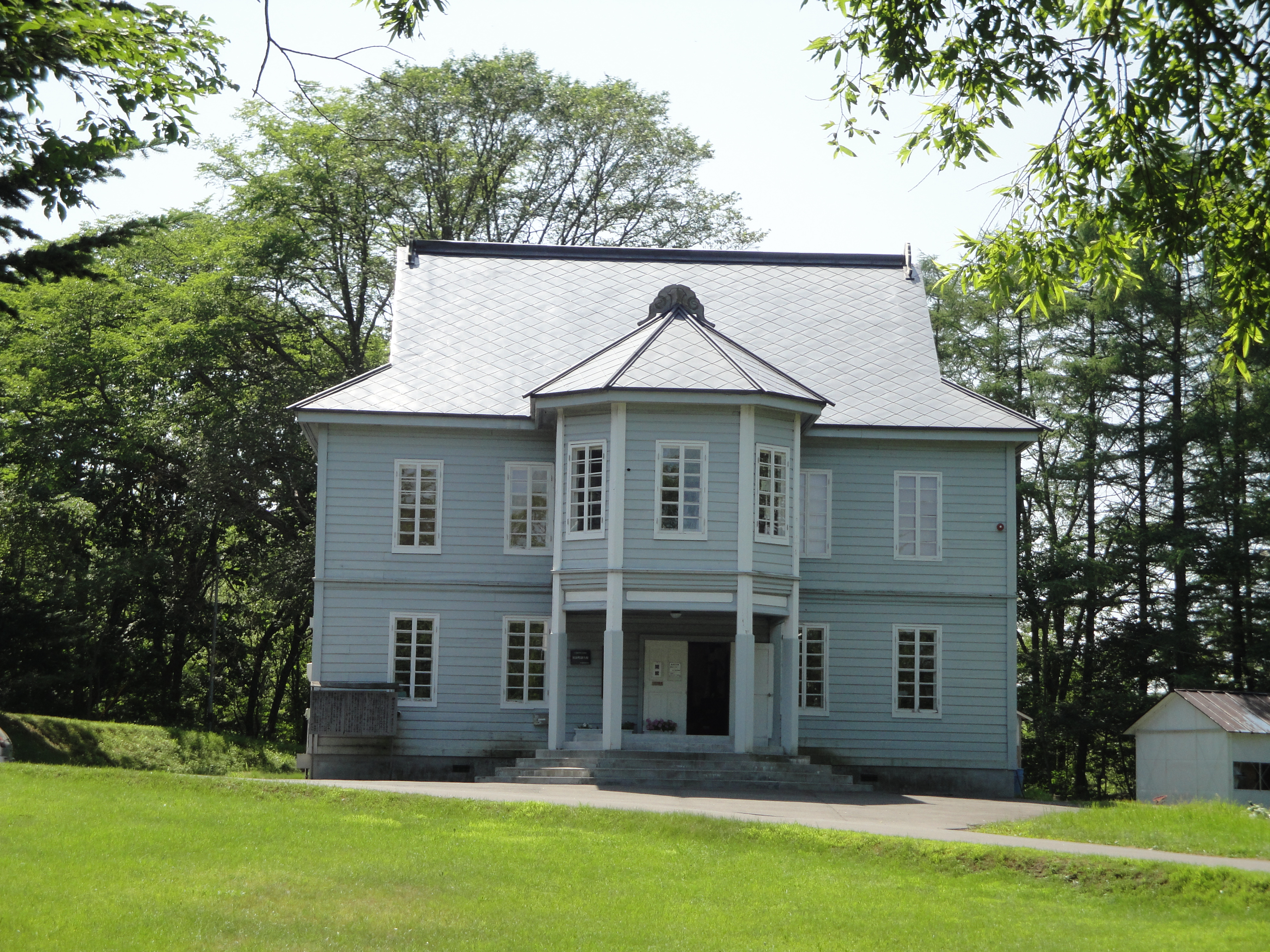
Shibecha Museum

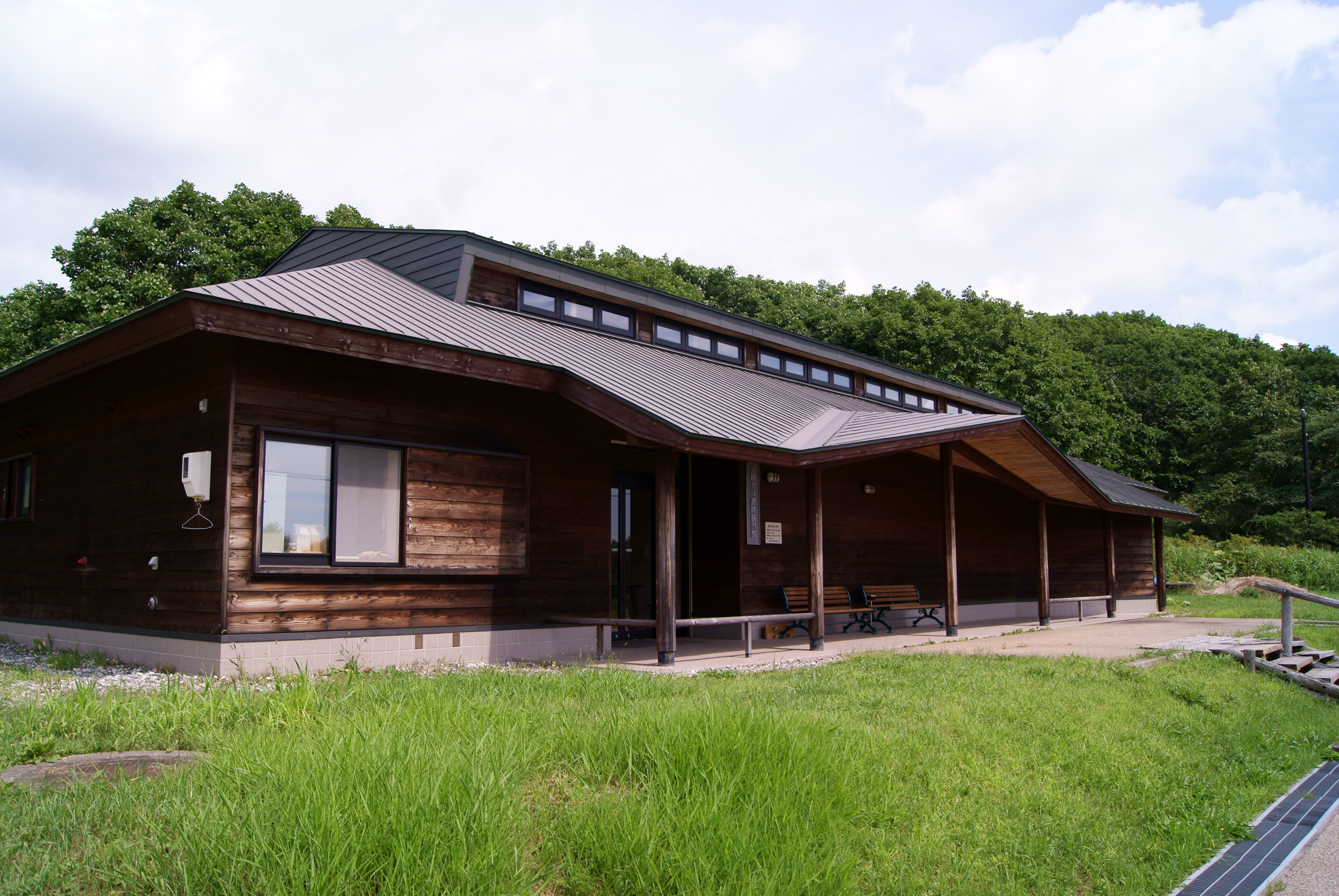
Hokuto Historic Relics Exhibition Hall

== Mascots ==
Milkcook and Kurobe Happy, the town's mascots

Kushiro's mascots is Milkcook (ミルクック, Mirukukku) and Kurobe Happy (ハッピーくろべえ, Happī Kurobe). They are bovines with a strong sense of justice.

- Milkcook is a mild-mannered dairy cow. She is a chef who can cook fast. She will moo if she fails to cook something good. As a result of her cooking skills, she promotes hospitality in the town while promoting the importance of milk. She became mascot in Spring 2006.
- Kurobe Happy is an optimistic bull who loves matsuris. He wears a blue happi. As a result of his fascination of festivals, he promotes events in the town while promoting the importance of beef. He became mascot during the 2011 Fall Matsuri.
