= Shirataki Site =

Shirataki site
- 白滝遺跡群 (Japanese)
- Shirataki site Shirataki Site (Japan)
- Interactive map of Shirataki site
- 43°52′28″N 143°08′00″E
- Cultures: Japanese Paleolithic
- Location: Engaru, Hokkaidō, Japan

The Shirataki site (白滝遺跡群, Shirataki isekigun) is a group of late Japanese Paleolithic archaeological sites located in the Kamishirataki neighbourhood of the town of Engaru, Monbetsu DIstrict, Hokkaidō, Japan. The site was designated a National Historic Site in 1989, with the area under protection expanded in 1997.

== Overview ==
The Shirataki site is located on a river terrace in the Yubetsu River basin, which flows from Mount Akaishi, a world-famous obsidian source. The area is home to approximately 100 archaeological sites. Approximately 6 million obsidian stone tools and numerous lithic fragments and lithic cores resulting from the lithic reduction manufacturing process have been excavated from the site, suggesting advanced stone tool manufacturing techniques. The distinctive microblade manufacturing technique found throughout Northeast Asia is now known as the "Yubetsu technique" after this site. In 1989, Site 13 of the Shirataki Site was designated a National Historic Site under the name "Shirataki Site." Following subsequent confirmation of the site's extent and content, the area under protection was further extended in 1997, and its name was changed to the "Shirataki Site Group." In addition, in 2011, 1,858 stone tool artifacts were designated as an Important Cultural Property; this designation was elevated to National Treasure status in 2023. The artifacts are now stored at the Engaru Town Buried Cultural Properties Center.

The site is located approximately 15 minutes by car from Shirataki Station on the JR Hokkaido Sekihoku Main Line.

== See also ==
- List of Historic Sites of Japan (Hokkaidō)
