= Ōyachi Shell Mound =

Ōyachi Shell Midden
- 大谷地貝塚 (Japanese)
- Ōyachi Shell Middenn Ōyachi Shell Mound (Japan)
- Interactive map of Ōyachi Shell Midden
- 43°11′27″N 140°50′07″E
- Type: shell midden
- Periods: Zoku-Jōmon
- Location: Yoichi, Japan
- Region: Hokkaido

The Ōyachi Shell Midden (大谷地貝塚, Ōyachi kaizuka) is an archaeological site in the Nobori neighborhood of the town of Yoichi Hokkaido, Japan with traces of a settlement and associated shell midden. The site was designated a National Historic Site in 2000.

== Overview ==
Around the turn of first millennium, coasts of Hokkaido were inhabited by the Zoku-Jōmon people, who were later supplanted by the Satsumon and Okhotsk peoples. The middens associated with their settlements contain bone, botanical material, mollusc shells, sherds, lithics, and other artifacts and ecofacts associated with the now-vanished inhabitants, and these features, provide a useful source into the diets and habits of society at the time.

The Ōyachi Shell Midden site covers an area of 33,000 square meters on the Kurokawa Sand Dunes facing Yoichi Bay on the Sea of Japan. Archaeological excavations have been conducted intermittently since the Taisho period, and in 1935, pottery excavated was identified as Yoichi-style pottery, making it a type site for the end of the Middle Jōmon period in southern Hokkaido. Five shell mounds, four pit dwelling remains, eight fireplace remains, and a cemetery have been discovered. Shells such as mussels, as well as bones from herring, mackerel, flounder, fur seals, and sea lions have also been excavated from the shell mound. While there are few shell mounds on the Sea of Japan coast, this is a representative shell mound site in Hokkaido. While currently closed to the public, the excavated pottery is on display at the Yoichi Fisheries Museum.

== See also ==
- List of Historic Sites of Japan (Hokkaidō)
