= Pirika Site =

Archaeological site in Imakane, Hokkaidō, Japan

- ピリカ遺跡 (Japanese)
- Pirika Site Pirika Site (Japan)
- Interactive map of Pirika Site
- 42°28′36″N 140°12′17″E
- Periods: Japanese Paleolithic
- Location: Imakane, Hokkaidō, Japan
- Region: Hokkaidō

Site notes
- Public access: Yes (museum)

The Pirika Site (ピリカ遺跡) is an archaeological site with traces of a late Japanese Paleolithic period stone tool manufacturing site, located in the town of Imakane, Hokkaidō, Japan. The site was designated a National Historic Site of Japan in 1994.

== Overview ==
The Pirika site spans an area of 1,000 meters east-to-west and 200 meters north-to-south in a scenic hilly area 150 meters above sea level, at the confluence of the Shibetsu River and Pirikabetsu River. Stone tools, including Microliths, projectile points, incisors, scrapers, and beads have been unearthed from an area of 1,585 square meters, particularly concentrated at the tip of the hill. Analysis indicates that the stone tools can be divided into three to five periods, with approximately 85% of the total number of stone tools made from shale, followed by agate at just under 10%. All of the raw materials are thought to have been obtained from the upper reaches of the Towarubetsu River and other rivers, which flow east toward Uchiura Bay, approximately five kilometers from the site. Traces of campfires and stone tool production have been found, although only about 1% of the site has been excavated, and over 200,000 stone tools have been unearthed. A portion of the artifacts has collectively been designated as National Important Cultural Property. This includes a number of beads made from dunite (a type of peridotite not found in Japan), which is believed to have been brought from Northeast Asia. The site was discovered in 1978 during soil surveys for the construction of the Pirika Dam in the upper reaches of the Shiribeshi-Toshibetsu River, in the mountainous area near Pirika Pass, a watershed on the Oshima Peninsula. The Hokkaido Archaeological Center conducted an investigation from 1983 to 1988, followed by the Imakane Town Board of Education in 1987. Artifacts are on display at the Pirika Paleolithic Culture Museum, the site's information center., which opened in 2003.

== See also ==
- List of Historic Sites of Japan (Hokkaidō)
