= Higashi Kushiro Shell Mound =

Archaeological site in Kushiro, Hokkaido of Japan

Higashi Kushiro Shell Midden
- 東釧路貝塚 (Japanese)
- Higashi Kushiro Shell Midden Higashi Kushiro Shell Mound (Japan)
- Interactive map of Higashi Kushiro Shell Midden
- 42°59′39″N 144°24′45″E
- Type: Midden
- Cultures: Jomon
- Location: Kushiro, Hokkaidō, Japan
- Region: Hokkaidō

The Higashi Kushiro Shell Middens (東釧路貝塚, Higashi Kushiro kaizuka) is an archaeological site located in the Kaizuka neighbourhood of the city of Kushiro, Hokkaidō, Japan. It was designated a National Historic Site in 1970, with the area under protection expanded in 1976.

== Overview ==
During the early to middle Jōmon period (approximately 4000 to 2500 BC), sea levels were five to six meters higher than at present, and the ambient temperature was also 2 degrees Celsius higher. During this period, the northern Kantō region was inhabited by the Jōmon people, many of whom lived in coastal settlements. The middens associated with such settlements contain bone, botanical material, mollusc shells, sherds, lithics, and other artifacts and ecofacts associated with the now-vanished inhabitants, and these features provide a useful source of insight into the diets and habits of Jōmon society. Most of these middens are found along the Pacific coast of Japan.

The Higashi Kushiro Shell Midden site is a complex archaeological site with over 14 stratigraphic layers, spanning from the early Jōmon period to the early modern period. It is the largest shell mound from the Early Jōmon period in Hokkaido. The shell mound measures 120 meters east-to-west and 90 meters north-to-south, with 11 blocks of varying sizes identified. The shell layer, approximately one meter thick, is made up of clams (asari), accounting for 70% of the total, and also contains oysters, giant Soft-shell clams, and warm-water ark shells (aka Akagai). Bones of sea lions, and other marine mammals, fish, and birds have also been excavated, as well as Jōmon pottery with engraved designs. Radial arrangements of dolphin skulls and traces of the burial of sea lions and dogs suggest a religious significance. The lower layers have yielded numerous flexed human burials from the early Jōmon period.

The site is a short walk from the JR Hokkaido Higashi-Kushiro Station.

== See also ==
- List of Historic Sites of Japan (Hokkaidō)
