= Okuyuki Post Station =

- 留萌佐賀家漁場 (Japanese)
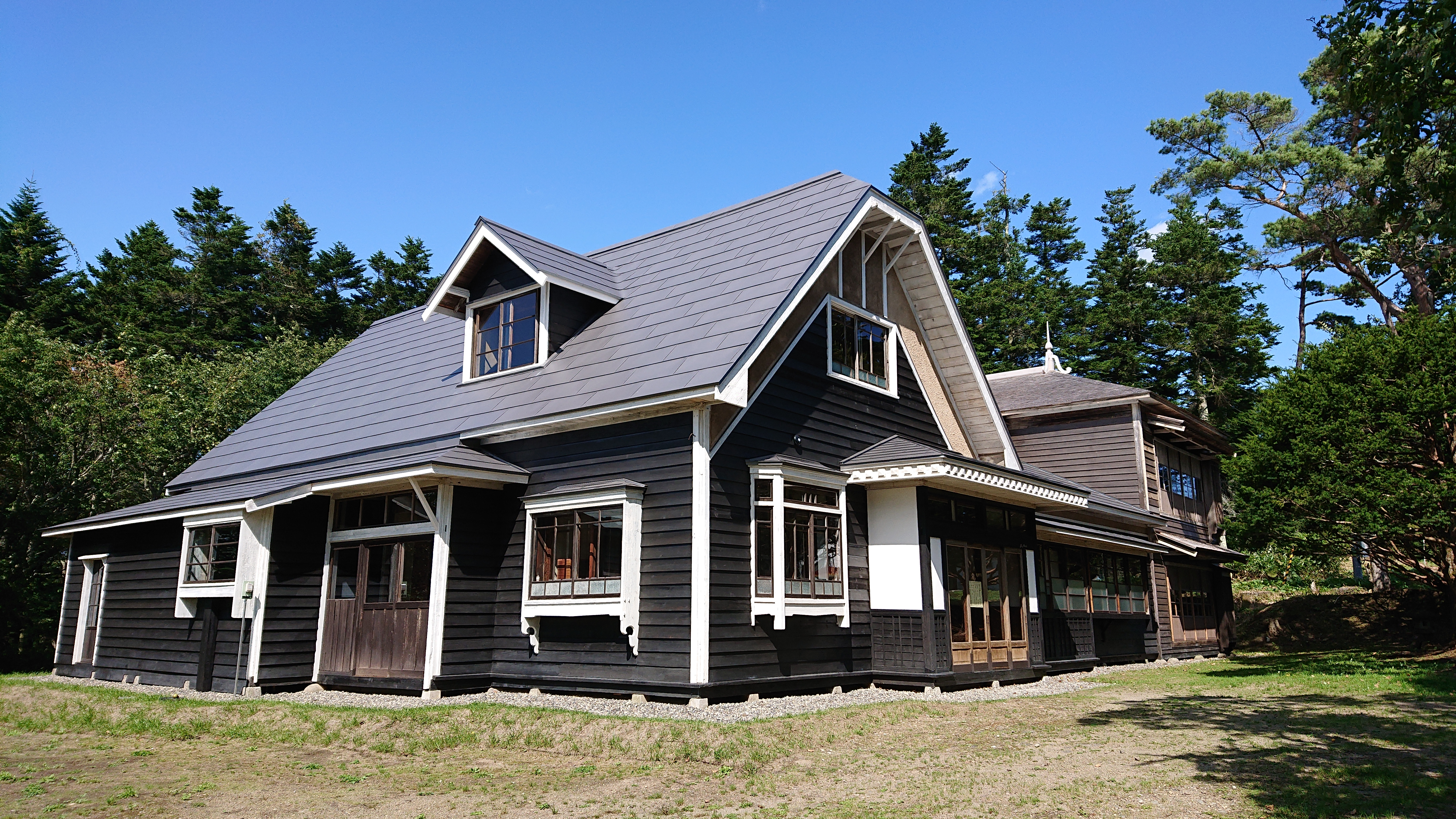
- Okuyuki Post Station in 2019

- Okuyuki Post Station Okuyuki Post Station (Japan)
- Interactive map of Okuyuki Post Station
- 43°18′46.4″N 145°12′35.3″E
- Periods: Meiji - Taisho period
- Location: 15-12 Okuyuki, Bekkai-cho, Notsuke-gun
- Region: Hokkaido

Site notes
- Public access: Yes (museum)

The Okuyuki Post Station (奥行臼駅逓所, Okuyuki-eki teisho) was a post station established in the Meiji period in the Okuyuki neighborhood of the town of Betsukai, Hokkaidō. It is one of the few survivors of a system that served as a transportation support organization in remote areas of Hokkaido, handling accommodation, horse and carriage relay services, and postal services. The site was designated a National Historic Site of Japan in 2011. The site is now at the intersection of Japan National Route 243 and Japan National Route 244.

== Overview ==
The Okuyuki Post Station is located approximately 9 kilometers inland from Nemuro Bay, between Nemuro and Betsukai in eastern Hokkaido. From 1910 to 1930, it served as a junction point for routes to Betsukai (present-day Honbetsu, Bettoga, and Nishibetsu, and is the only one of the nine post stations in Bekkai Town that still exists. During the colonisation of Hokkaido under the Meiji government, post station providing services such as horse and carriage relay, accommodation, and transportation of goods were constructed in line with the settlement of inland areas and the development of roads, reaching its peak during the Taishō period, with 270 stations in 1921. Subsequently, as settlements formed in the colonized areas and urbanization progressed, and as railways and private facilities were developed, the role of these post stations diminished, and their number decreased, until they were completely abolished in 1947. Okuyuki-Usu (the name of the hamlet where the post station was located), saw the beginning of Japanese settlement after 1897, becoming a region whose main industries were charcoal production utilizing the primeval forests and livestock farming utilizing the vast cultivated land. Fujijirō Yamazaki (1860–1940), who became the post station manager when the station was established in 1910, settled in Okuyuki-Usu, leased a vast area of undeveloped land, and managed a livestock farm, later becoming a prominent figure and a large ranch owner with over 200 horses. The former Okuyuki-Usu post station served as a relay station connecting the coastal and inland areas of Nemuro and Betsukai. Yamazaki's house was used as the post station building, and in 1920, a two-story hip-roofed extension was added as a guest room. However, with the opening of the Nemuro Main Line of the colonial railway in 1925 its necessity gradually diminished, and it was abolished in 1930. After its closure as a post station, it continued to operate as an inn managed by the Yamazaki family, and this continued until the post-war period.

One station building, two stables, and two warehouses remain, serving as reminders of the post station era. The station building is a two-story wooden structure with a hipped roof (partially gabled). The surrounding area features old roads and pastures dating back to the post station era, preserving the historical landscape of the time. Numerous documents and furnishings from the post station era also remain. In 2021, the Betsukai Town Board of Education decided on a plan to develop approximately 23 hectares, where the former Okuusubetsu Post Station, the former Japanese National Railways Okuusubetsu Station (Town-designated Cultural Property), and the former Okuusubetsu stop on the Betsukai Village-operated Furen Line (Town-designated Cultural Property) are concentrated, into the "Okuusubetsu Historical Site Park".

It is approximately 18 minutes by car from Attoko Station on the JR Hokkaidō Nemuro Main Line.

== See also ==
- List of Historic Sites of Japan (Hokkaidō)
