= Mobetsu Castle =

Mobetsu Castle 茂別館跡
- Hokuto, Hokkaido, Japan

Site information
- Type: chashi-style Japanese castle
- Open to the public: yes
- Condition: ruins

Location
- Mobetsu Castle Mobetsu Castle 茂別館跡 (Japan)
- Coordinates: 41°46′13″N 140°36′15″E

Site history
- Built: 1443
- Built by: Ando clan
- National Historic Site of Japan

Mobetsu Castle (茂別館跡, Mobetsu Tate-ato) was a Japanese castle located in what is now the town of Hokuto, Hokkaido, Japan. Its ruins were proclaimed a National Historic Site in 1982.

== Overview ==
The ruins of this castle are located on a hill 10-40 meters above sea level on the left bank of the Moheji River, which flows south from Umedsuke Pass, a watershed in the Oshima Mountains, at the western end of Hakodate Bay. It overlooks the eastern entranance to Hakodate Bay and Tsugaru Strait. It is one of the twelve castles in southern Hokkaido. It is also located about 500 meters south to the mouth of the Doi River. A sandbar exists on the southern shore of the river mouth, forming an inlet, and a natural harbor. At the base of the sandbar, on the western hill, are said to be the remains of Jigen-ji, a prayer hall for the Andō clan.

According to historical sources such as the "Shinra no Kiroku" the Andō clan (安東氏, Andō-shi) were installed in the Tsugaru district of Mutsu Province to trade with Ainu people for the Hōjō clan, and to administer Ezo as a penal colony in the Kamakura period. By the early Muromachi period, their stronghold of Tosaminato (in present-day Aomori Prefecture) was a major port on the coastal trade routes along the Sea of Japan, and was also actively involved in overseas trade directly with the Korean Peninsula. However, Andō Morisue lost Tosaminato to an attack by the Nanbu clan in 1442, and the following year fled from Kodomari to Hokkaidō. The fortification at Mobetsu was completed in 1443, and became the stronghold of Andō Masasue from 1454 to 1456. After that, Shimokuni (Andō) Iemasa, presumably Masasue's younger brother, defended the fortification during the Battle of Koshamain in May 1457. This was a major Ainu uprising in which ten castles in southern Hokkaido were attacked and captured one after another, with only Mobetsu and Hanazawa Castles surviving. Later, the Shimokuni (Andō) clan became part of Matsumae Domain, and continued to rule the area around Mobetsu to the Meiji restoration

Moheji Castle consists of the "Odate" (large enclosure to the south and "Kodate" (small enclosure) to the north. It is separated from the Moheji River by a cliff to the west and a natural stream to the north and south. The Odate and Kodate were each surrounded by a moat and a natural stream to the east and by earthen ramparts on three sides: north, east, and south. These ramparts and dry moats remain to this day. The ruins are approximately a 13-minute walk from Moheji Station on the JR Hokkaido Esashi Line.

== See also ==
- List of Historic Sites of Japan (Hokkaidō)

== Literature ==
- De Lange, William (2021). An Encyclopedia of Japanese Castles. Groningen: Toyo Press. pp. 600 pages. ISBN 978-9492722300.
- Motoo, Hinago (1986). Japanese Castles. Tokyo: Kodansha. p. 200 pages. ISBN 0-87011-766-1.
