= Otoe Stone Circle =

Archaeological site in Fukugawa, Japan

Otoe Stone Circles
- 音江環状列石 (Japanese)
- Otoe Stone Circles Otoe Stone Circle (Japan)
- Interactive map of Otoe Stone Circles
- 43°40′26.5″N 142°2′1.1″E
- Type: stone circles
- Periods: late to final Jōmon period
- Location: Fukagawa, Hokkaidō, Japan
- Region: Hokkaidō

Site notes
- Public access: Yes

The Otoe Stone Circles (音江環状列石, Otoe Kanjyō Resseki) is a late to final Jōmon period archaeological site in the city of Fukagawa, Hokkaidō Japan. The site was designated a National Historic Site in 1956.

== Oveview ==
The Otoe Stone Circles are located on a 113-meter-high plateau called Mount Inami, which offers a panoramic view of the entire Uryu County. They was discovered around 1908 by a local resident, and archaeological excavations began in 1918 by Hokkaido Imperial University, with further excavations conducted in 1951 by Tokyo University and 1952 by Hokkaidō University. The stone circles each consist of roughly a dozen relatively small stones, and range in diameter from two to five meters. Thirteen tombs have been identified, but more than 40 are believed to exist.

While stone circles (such as the Ōyu Stone Circles in Kazuno, Akita) are typically ritual sites, the Otoe Stone Circles were found to be tombs. Each contained an oval or square-shaped earth pit about one meter deep, with locally sourced andesite stones crushed and laid or piled inside. Corroded human bones, small jade beads, obsidian arrowheads, chert stone spoons, and fragments of vermilion lacquer bows have been excavated from the pits. The stone circles are groups into a northern set, containing the first ten stone circles, and a southern set containing No.11 through No.13 along with earthen embankments measuring about 30 meters in length from east-to-west and north-to-south, covered with flat stones.

These artifacts are preserved at the local history museum in the city.

== See also ==
- List of Historic Sites of Japan (Hokkaidō)
