= Harutoridaichi Pit Dwellings =

Archaeological site in Kushiro, Hokkaido of Japan

Harutoridaichi Pit Dwelling site
- 春採台地竪穴群 (Japanese)
- Harutoridaichi Pit Dwelling site Harutoridaichi Pit Dwellings (Japan)
- Interactive map of Harutoridaichi Pit Dwelling site
- 42°58′29″N 144°23′58″E
- Cultures: Satsumon culture
- Location: Kushiro, Hokkaidō, Japan
- Region: Hokkaidō

Site notes
- Public access: park

The Harutoridaichi Pit Dwelling site (春採台地竪穴群, Harutoridaichi tateana-gun) is an archaeological site located in the Harutoridaichi neighbourhood of the city of Kushiro, Hokkaidō, Japan. It was designated a National Historic Site in 1935.

== Overview ==
Harutoridaichi Pit Dwelling site is a group of Satsumon period pit dwellings located on the Harutori Plateau in Kushiro. Originally, there were over 200 pit dwelling remains on the Harutori Plateau surrounding Lake Harutori. The northern area, where the pit dwelling remains are particularly concentrated, was designated a national historic site in 1935. There are 59 dwelling remains here, 31 of which can be seen sunken below the ground surface. The area is the remains of a settlement from the late Satsumon period, between the 12th and 13th centuries, and pottery from the early Jomon period has also been excavated from the cliff face on the lake side.

The site is within the Kushiro City Harutoridaichi Park, approximately 3.4 kilometers southeast of JR Hokkaido Kushiro Station.

== See also ==
- List of Historic Sites of Japan (Hokkaidō)
