= Usakumai Sites =

- ウサクマイ遺跡群 (Japanese)
- Usakumai Sites Usakumai Sites (Japan)
- Interactive map of Usakumai Sites
- 42°48′32.6″N 141°34′27.6″E
- Type: settlement trace
- Periods: Satsumon - Okhotsk
- Location: Chitose, Japan
- Region: Hokkaido

Site notes
- Public access: Yes

The Usakumai Sites (ウサクマイ遺跡群, Usakumai iseki) is a group of archaeological sites in the Rankoshi neighborhood of the city of Chitose, Hokkaido, Japan. The group was collectively designated a National Historic Site in 1979.

== Overview ==
The Usakumai Sites are located in an area of approximately 146 hectares (including the "Usakumai C Site" and 20 other sites) in the Uchibetsu River basin. It contains 75 depressions believed to be the remains of settlements from the Satsumon period, as well as artifacts such as a male clay figurine believed to have been made in the late Jōmon period, pottery in the Okhotsk culture style (which flourished in the Okhotsk Sea coastal region around the 8th century), Satsumon pottery, and the "Fujushinpo" coin, one of the twelve Kocho Junisen coins minted in 818 by the Imperial court in Heian-kyō. The place name "Usakumai" originates from the Ainu language "O-sak-oma-i" (meaning "there is a drying rack downstream"). In this case, the "drying rack" refers to a facility for making dried fish, suggesting that the area was rich in marine resources and easy to establish a settlement.

The Usakumai A site contains 28 burial pits, and excavated artifacts include warabide-style swords, knives, Satsumon pottery, Hokudai-style pottery, and Haji ware pottery, indicating extensive cultural exchange with the Tōhoku region in ancient times. The Usakumai C site is a large settlement site with 79 pit dwellings. Part of the Usakumai J site contains a peat layer composed of fallen leaves and branches, and in addition to animal and plant remains, Jōmon pottery has also been discovered. Currently, a viewing course has been developed at the Usakumai C site, which still retains clear depressions of the dwelling sites on the surface. .

== See also ==
- List of Historic Sites of Japan (Hokkaidō)
