= Hokuto Site =

Archaeological site in Kushiro, Hokkaido of Japan

- 北斗遺跡 (Japanese)
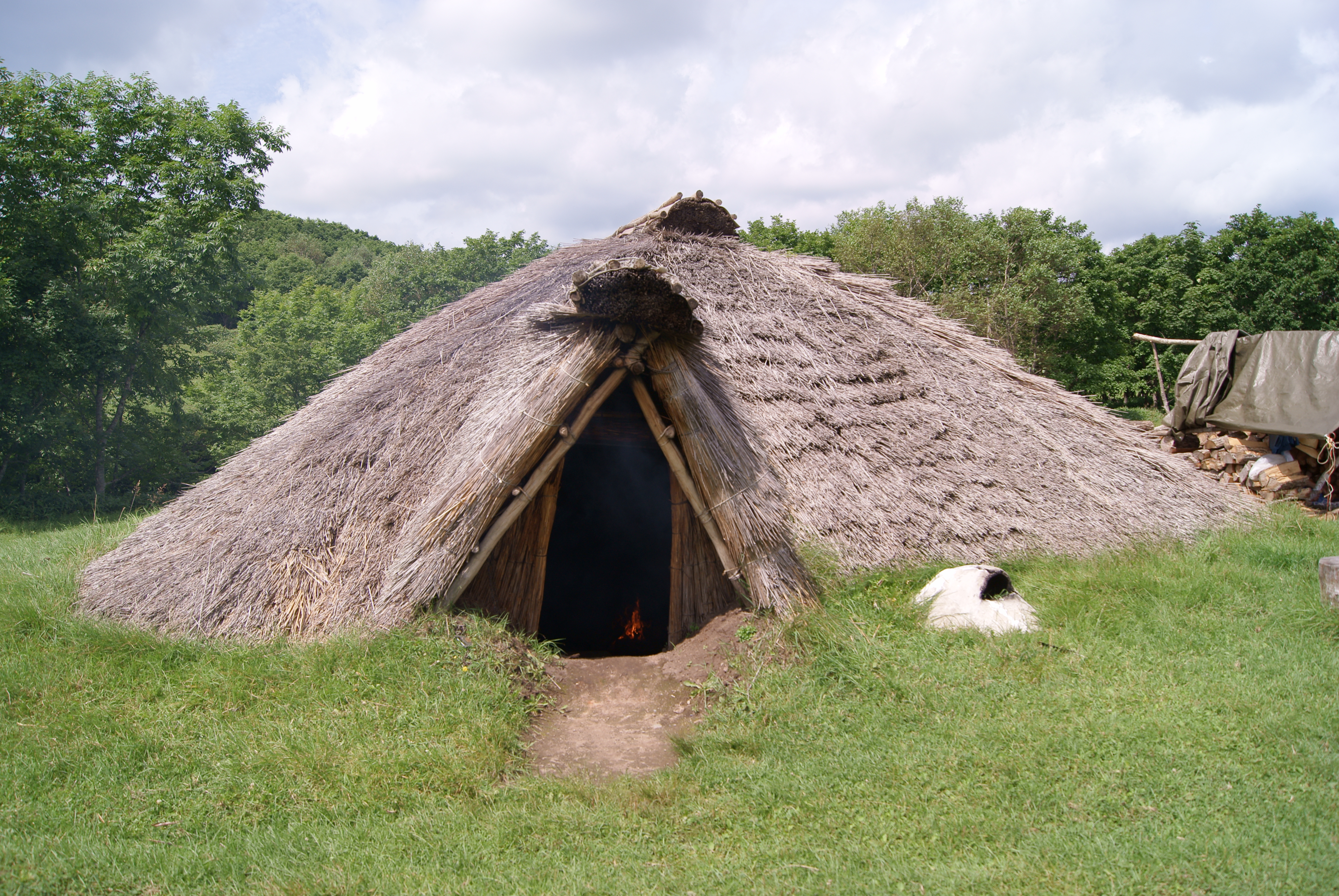
- Reconstructed pit dwelling at Hokuto Site

- Hokuto Site Hokuto Site (Japan)
- Interactive map of Hokuto Site
- 43°04′07″N 144°19′02″E
- Type: Settlement
- Cultures: Jōmon
- Location: Kushiro, Hokkaidō, Japan
- Region: Hokkaidō

The Hokuto Site (北斗遺跡, Hokuto iseki) is an archaeological site located in the Hokuto neighbourhood of the city of Kushiro, Hokkaidō, Japan. It was designated a National Historic Site in 1977.

== Overview ==
The Hokuto site is a complex site containing remains and artifacts dating from the pre-Jōmon period to the early modern period. It is located on a fluvial terrace overlooking the Kushiro Marsh, approximately seven kilometers northwest of Kushiro city. The site was discovered in 1952 during construction work to lay a railway, and a survey conducted in 1970 confirmed the remains of 386 pit dwellings. The remains of these dwellings were found by depressions in the ground surface. Subsequently, in 1972–73, a topographical survey of the site was conducted, and partial archaeological excavations were conducted. At total of 102 shallow circular and oval pit dwellings from the Jōmon and Post-Jōmon periods, and 232 rectangular pit dwellings from the Satsumon period were found within a 2.5 kilometer radius. Artifacts included microblade culture, believed to represent the final stage of the pre-Jōmon period, early, middle and late to post-Jōmon pottery, and Satsumon pottery as well as ironware, textile artifacts, parts of weaving tools, and cultivated plant seeds. Shell mounds from the early Jōmon period were found in the oldest layer. Early modern Ainu artifacts have also been discovered.

In July 1977, the eastern 233,471 square meters of the site was designated a National Historic Site due to its status as the largest and most important archaeological site on the western edge of the Kushiro Wetlands. The Hokuto Ruins Exhibition Hall, a guide facility adjacent to the historic site, houses six reconstructed dwellings and other exhibits.

The site is a short walk from the JR Hokkaido Higashi-Kushiro Station.

== See also ==
- List of Historic Sites of Japan (Hokkaidō)
