= Former Yoichi Fukuhara Fishery =

Yoichi Fukuhara Family Fishery
- 余市福原漁場 (Japanese)
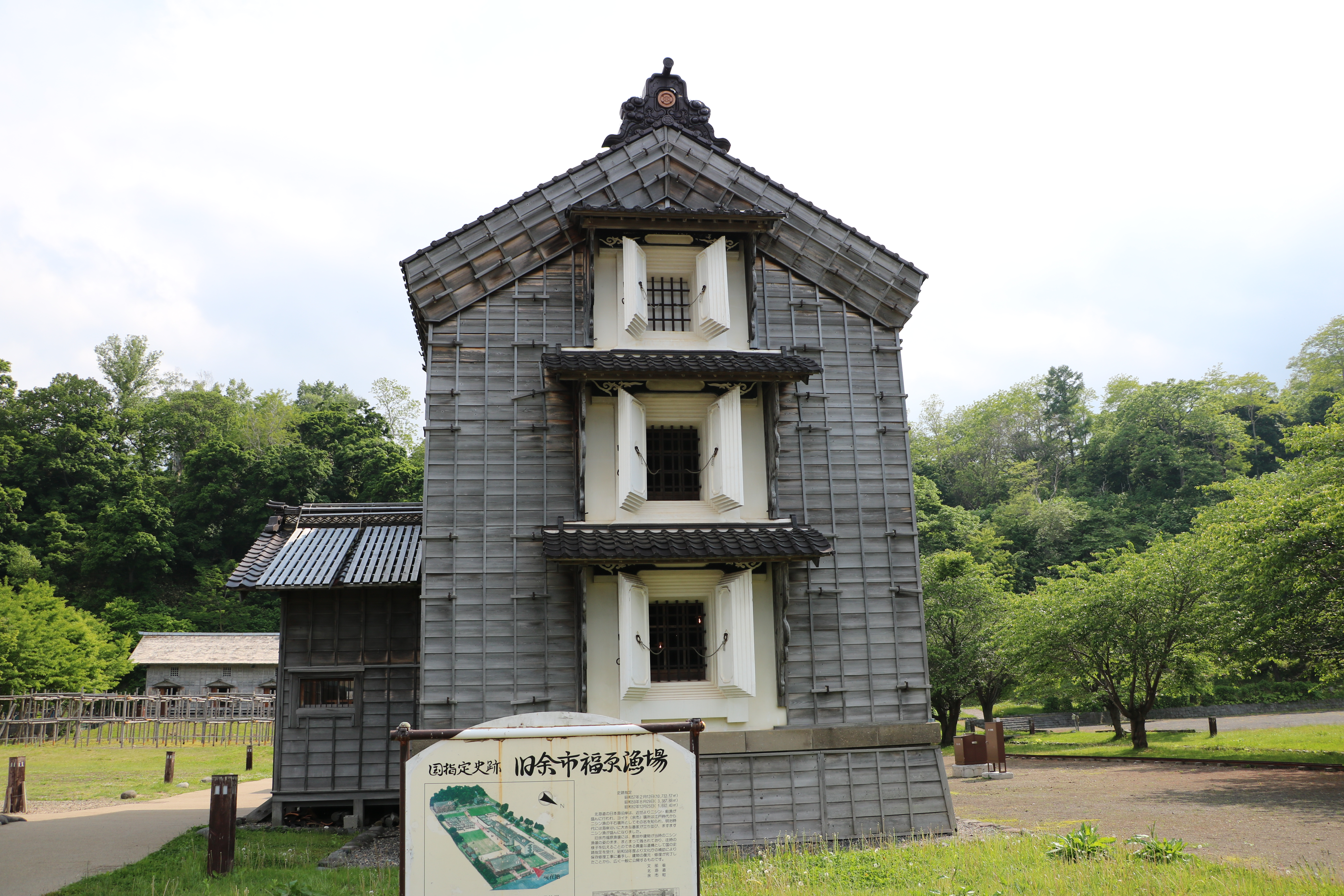
- Yoichi Fukuhara Family Fishery warehouse

- Yoichi Fukuhara Family Fishery Former Yoichi Fukuhara Fishery (Japan)
- 43°11′59″N 140°46′42″E
- Type: industrial site
- Periods: Edo period - Showa period
- Location: Yoichi, Hokkaido, Japan
- Region: Hokkaido

Site notes
- Public access: Yes (museum)
- National Historic Site of Japan

The Yoichi Fukuhara Family Fishery (余市福原漁場, Yoichi Fukuhara-ke gyoba) was a fishery established in the Edo period in the Hamanaka neighborhood of the town of Yoichi, Hokkaidō. The site was designated a National Historic Site of Japan in 1982, with the area under protection expanded in 1987.

== Overview ==
The coastal waters off Hokkaido's Sea of Japan coast, including Esashi, Suttsu, Yoichi, and Rumoi have been major fishing grounds since the Edo period, and numerous fishing facilities were built along the coast. Matsumae Domain which also established trading posts to manage the Ainu population. The Fukuhara clan settled in this area in the late 19th century. The complex consists of six structures: the main house, a document storehouse, a rice and miso storehouse, a net storehouse, a toilet, and a storehouse. The main building, which also served as the guardhouse and as accommodation for migrant fishermen, had the wooden-floors which were removed during the peak of herring fishing season to create an improvised dining table so that fishermen could eat with their shoes on. The rice and miso storehouse, where straw products and food were stored, featured measures such as filling the gaps between the outer and inner walls with stones to prevent rats from entering. Most of these structures were constructed around 1880, but were restored only after a decade of the National Historic Site designation and opened to the public in 1995.

The former Yoichi Fukuhara Fishery Grounds passed through the ownership of the Fukuhara family, followed by the Omura, Oguro, and Kawauchi families. According to documents, Fukuhara Saishichi I's grandfather, Yotaro, came as a migrant herring fisherman during the Ansei era, eventually moving to Yoichi in the early Meiji era. With the abolition of the location contract system and the enactment of the Meiji Fisheries Law, the migrant fishermen obtained herring fishing rights, and the Fukuhara family also obtained four permits. Fukuhara Saishichi I inherited the family business at the age of 37 in 1884. Around this time, he expanded the business by purchasing surrounding land and buildings, and participated in the founding of Yoichi Bank, establishing himself as a wealthy local magnate. Herring catches increased steadily until the mid-1890s, but signs of decline began to appear from the end of the decade and after poor catches, ownership of the fishing grounds passed to Omura Yutaro and Oguro Hamazo, and in 1912, it was sold to the Kawauchi family, a herring fishing household. Herring fishing along the Yoichi coast continued to suffer poor catches as the Showa era began, and the Kawauchi family, who had long operated the fishing grounds, withdrew from the industry in 1947.The site was eventually donated to Yoichi Town.

The complex is a 20-minute walk from Yoichi Station on the JR Hokkaido Hakodate Main Line or a ten-minute walk from Yoichi Town Hall.

== See also ==
- List of Historic Sites of Japan (Hokkaidō)
