= Jindai moji =

Purported ancient Japanese characters

Jindai moji or Kamiyo moji (Japanese: 神代文字 "Symbols from the Age of Gods") are forged characters purported to have been used in ancient Japan. Some have claimed since the mid-Edo period that such ancient characters, for example such as Chikushi characters and Hokkaido characters, have been found in archeological remains, in Kofun and on mountains, but all jindai moji are generally considered to be forgeries.

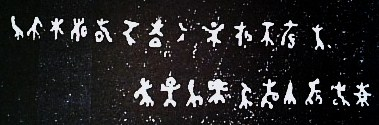
Hokkaido characters investigated by Enomoto Takeaki and John Milne

== History ==
The concept of jindai moji was first addressed at the end of the Kamakura period. Urabe no Kanekata (卜部兼方) mentioned in Shaku Nihongi (1301 or earlier) that his father, Urabe no Kanefumi, argued that the ancient Japanese could not have performed bone-style fortunetelling with turtleshells (亀卜, Kameura, "turtle fortunetelling"), as described in the Nihon Shoki, without having a writing system. The Urabe (卜部) had a family monopoly on plastromancy (卜 : uranai divination using deer scapula or turtle plastrons), giving them a family interest in claiming perpetual service to the Imperial family even before the arrival of Chinese culture. (The modern view is that plastromancy was part of Chinese culture, and entered Japan in company with the Chinese writing system; the only candidate for the clan that brought this from China to Japan is the Urabe clan itself.)

Some examples of jindai moji appeared during the Edo period, each set being named after its supposed source. Even then, the authenticity of jindai moji was supported by scholars such as Tsurumine Shigenobu (鶴峯戊申), and at least one scholar, Hirata Atsutane, changed his opinion from negative to positive. Other scholars, such as Kaibara Ekken, Dazai Shundai (太宰春台), Kamo no Mabuchi, Motoori Norinaga and Tō Teikan (藤貞幹), rejected both the concepts and the claimed examples. The most famous publication denying the existence of jindai moji was Jindaiji ben (神代字弁), attached to Kana no motosue (仮字本末) by Ban Nobutomo (伴信友), which appeared in 1850. The skepticism about jindai moji that developed in the Edo period has been the prevailing attitude among scholars ever since.

In 1930, a Ontake-kyō religious sect, Kōso Kōtai Jingū Amatsukyō, was charged with lèse-majesté by the special higher police. Amatsukyō was based around documents that were partly written in what its members said were jindai moji. Experts in linguistics and other scholars gave evidence in court that the documents were forgeries. The documents and other artifacts of this sect were destroyed in the American bombardment of Tokyo during World War II.

== Reasons for skepticism ==
1. The Kogo Shūi, written in 808, clearly states that the Japanese had no writing system, and thus no characters, before kanji were imported, and nobody before Urabe no Kanekata (mentioned above) made any reference to such "ancient characters".
2. The examples of jindai moji that have been put forward over the years have all clearly been based on Modern Japanese, which had five vowels, and not Old Japanese, which until the Heian period had eight vowels.
3. Shinkichi Hashimoto (1882 – 1945) studied documents written in man'yōgana during the Nara period and found the Jōdai Tokushu Kanazukai, proving that there were 88 sounds in the ancient language, but jindai moji have only 50 or fewer, matching the Gojūon and Iroha of the Heian period.
4. If jindai moji had been in use before the Japanese became aware of kanji, it is impossible to explain why they would have swiftly and totally abandoned such characters in favor of the much more complex new characters derived from China, or why they then went on to develop man'yōgana, hiragana and katakana, all of which are based on kanji and show no evidence of any connection with jindai moji.

== Claims in favor of jindai moji ==
Some recent writers have interpreted the following passage in the Shaku Nihongi to support their view that jindai moji were in use in ancient Japan: "There are six or seven documents written in characters of Hi Province (肥人の字、Ahiru characters) in the Ministry of the Treasury."

It was reported in the late 19th century that ancient characters had been found in Ryukyu and in Ezo. These claims received some support from mainstream scholars at the time.

== Examples ==
- Woshite characters（ヲシテ文字）
- Izumo characters（出雲文字）
- Ahiru characters（阿比留文字、肥人書）
- Ahiru kusa characters（阿比留草文字、薩人書）
- Tsukushi characters（筑紫文字）
- Katakamuna characters（カタカムナ文字、八鏡化美津文字）
- Hokkaido characters（北海道異体文字、アイヌ文字）
- Ryukyu characters（琉球古字）
- Toyokuni characters（豊国文字、神宮文字）
- Tsushima characters （対馬文字）

== Notable references ==
- Shinmura Izuru, 『上古文字論批判』 (Criticism of Ancient Character Theories, 1898)
- Shinkichi Hashimoto, 『國語学概論』 (Introduction to National Language Studies, 1925)
- Geirin 『藝林』 第4巻(1958)
- Naozumi Ochiai, 『日本古代文字考』 落合直澄(Thoughts on Japanese Ancient Characters, 1888)
- Kiyohiko Ago, 『神代文字研究原典』(Research on Characters of the Age of the Gods, 1975)
