= Hokkaido characters =

Hokkaido Characters
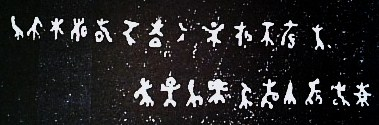
- Script type: Jindai moji
- Time period: Meiji period?
- Languages: Uncertain

Related scripts
- Parent systems: Rock paintings in Temiya Cave?: Hokkaido Characters

Unicode
- Unicode range: Unallocated

The Hokkaido characters (北海道異体文字, hokkaidō itai moji), also known as Aino characters (アイノモジ, aino moji) or Ainu characters (アイヌ文字, ainu moji), are a set of characters discovered around 1886 on the Japanese island of Hokkaido. At the time of their discovery, they were believed to be a genuine script, but this view is not generally supported today. (Note: Harada Minoru says of these "Ainu characters", as well as jindai moji in general, that "At this point, there is not enough proof to convince archaeologists of these notions. Some researcher will claim to have found petroglyphs, but when someone goes to confirm this, they turn out to be nothing more than natural cracks in the stone. It's safe to say that not one single archaeological excavation [in Japan] has yielded accepted evidence of an ancient script other than kanji. This fact is something of a bottleneck when considering the possibility of the real existence of these jindai moji." (現在までにこのような試みは考古学者をも納得させるだけの証拠を示すにいたっていない。ペトログラフにいたっては、研究者の報告を現地で確認すると単なる自然石の亀裂だったりする始末だ。古代の考古学的出土物から、漢字以外の文字を検出する確認された例は皆無といってよいのである。この点も神代文字を実在の古代文字と考える大きなネックとなっている。) Harada, Minoru. 図説神代文字入門 [An Illustrated Primer of Jindai Moji] (in Japanese). p. 174.)

== Discovery and research ==
Heikichi Shōji, a member of the Tokyo Anthropological Society (東京人類学会), collected various Ainu artifacts in Hokkaido, including some antiques with characters written on them. Among these, a piece of bark and a sash were introduced in the September 9, 1886 issue of the Mutsu Shimpo (陸奥新報), a local newspaper in Aomori Prefecture, and three days later in the Sendai paper Ōunichi Nichishinbun (奥羽日日新聞). Enomoto Takeaki opined that these must have been characters used by the Emishi a thousand years before. At the 25th meeting of the Tokyo Anthropological Society in December of that year, Shōji displayed pieces of leather, stone fragments, washi (Japanese paper), and a sheath, all inscribed with the characters.

The anthropologist Tsuboi Shōgorō published an article in 1887 in the 12th issue of the Tokyo Anthropological Society Report that used the Hokkaido characters, along with carvings in Temiya Cave and Oshoro Stone Circle in Otaru City, to support his own Koro-pok-guru theory. This theory argued that the Koro-pok-guru, a legendary race of small people in Ainu mythology, were in fact residents of Japan predating the Ainu themselves, and had been forced to the northeast by the immigration of the Ainu's ancestors.

In August 1887, Tsuboi went on to publish an article in the 18th issue of the Tokyo Anthropological Society Magazine entitled Variant Characters on Antique Articles from Around Hokkaido (北海道諸地方より出でたる古器物上に在る異体文字). In addition to stating that the characters were systematically arranged, unlike those at Temiya Cave, and thus represented a script, he further suggested the possibility that these characters were used by people who came to Japan from Eurasia.

In October of the same year, this time in the 20th issue of that same Tokyo Anthropological Society Magazine, Shōji himself released an article called Ancient Characters of Hokkaido and the Aino (アイノ及び北海道の古代文字). Although he admitted that there was no proof, Shōji expressed the view that these characters were likely used by the Emishi in ancient times.

In 1888, the Kokugaku scholar Naosumi Ochiai wrote a book entitled Ancient Characters of Japan (日本古代文字考). Therein he posited that the Hokkaido characters were used by the Emishi people, who neither understood Japanese nor used Kanji. He further produced 14 symbols, combinations of which supposedly composed 50 of the characters, but supposed that it would prove impossible to understand them without knowing their readings. In the appendix on dubious characters in Hirata Atsutane's Shinji Hifumi-den (神字日文伝), he suggested a connection between the Hokkaido characters and Izumo characters, as well as other supposedly ancient characters.

In 1975, Kiyohiko Agō wrote Japanese Jindai Moji (日本神代文字), in which he connected the Hokkaido characters with not only the carvings in Temiya Cave but also those in Fugoppe Cave, in the town of Yoichi.

The Japan Exploration Association (日本探検協会), headed by Takahashi Yoshinori, claims a connection between jindai moji including the Hokkaido characters and an advanced prehistoric society, and further between the Hokkaido characters and the ancient Sumerian and Assyrian civilizations of Mesopotamia. Furthermore, they claim that the carvings in the Fugoppe Cave themselves consist of the Hokkaido characters.

In 2007, the author Harada Minoru, a member of the skeptical group Togakkai (the "Academy of Outrageous Books"), offered the following evaluation:

Perhaps the carvings in Fujishima Cave in Izumo are also rock art of the same type as that of Temiya and Fugoppe Caves. The resemblance between the Izumo characters and the Ainu characters pointed out by Ochiai might even suggest ancient cultural interchange between Hokkaido and the San'in region. (Note: あるいは、出雲の書島石窟なるものも、手宮やフゴッペと同系統の洞窟壁画だったのではないだろうか。落合が指摘した出雲文字とアイヌ文字の外見上の類似（さらには手宮・フゴッペ洞窟壁画との類似）、そこには古代の北海道と山陰地方の間での文化交流の存在が示唆されているともいえよう。, (Japanese-language quotation))

— Harada, Minoru. 図説神代文字入門 [An Illustrated Primer of Jindai Moji] (in Japanese). p. 138.

== Overview of inscribed artifacts ==
The names and descriptions of these are mostly from Shōji (1887).

Item	Explanation
Natural stone: Group 1, Item 1	About four characters in red on the front, about 32 characters in red forming three lines on the back. (Note: Agō (1975) describes the letters as written in gold paint (金泥をもってアイノモジを書きつけている), but Shōji (1887) describes them as a reddish brown close to red (文字は朱色に類し小豆色).); Obtained from someone searching for antiques in Sōya District, Hokkaido. Supposedly originally owned by an Ainu from Sakhalin. Sketched in Shōji (1887).
Natural stone: Group 1, Item 2	About 14 characters forming two lines in red on the front, about 18 characters forming two lines in red on the back. Origin as above. Sketched in Shōji (1887).
Natural stone: Group 1, Item 3	About 24 characters in red forming an arc, with about four more inside the arc. Origin as above. Sketched in Shōji (1887).
Natural stone: Group 2, Item 1	About 29 characters in red forming 3 lines on the front, about 23 characters in red forming 2 lines on the back. An image drawn on the back appears to represent a shiyokichi stick (シヨキチ棒), an Ainu weapon used to pierce the top of an enemy's foot. Origin as above. Sketched in Shōji (1887).
Natural stone: Group 2, Item 2	About 23 characters in red forming 5 lines. Origin as above. Sketched in Shōji (1887).
Natural stone: Group 2, Item 3	About 25 characters in red forming 3 lines. Origin as above. Sketched in Shōji (1887).
Tree bark	About 13 characters in red. Obtained from an Ainu in the village of Yobetsu in Shakotan District, Hokkaido. Introduced in September 1886 via the Mutsu Shimpo and thereafter in the Ōunichi Nichishinbun. Characters traced in Ochiai (1888).
Sash-like object (Sash made of rough fabric)	About 19 characters in red. However, Shōji conjectured that some of them were added at a later time. Introduced in September 1886 via the Mutsu Shimpo and thereafter in the Ōunichi Nichishinbun, and exhibited at the 25th meeting of the Tokyo Anthropological Society that December. Characters traced in Ochiai (1888).
Leather	About 44 characters in gold forming 5 lines. Exhibited at the 25th meeting of the Tokyo Anthropological Society in December 1886. Characters traced in Tsuboi (1887).
Hexagonal prism stone piece	Characters in gold. Excavated from Kawa Village in Yoichi District. Exhibited at the 25th meeting of the Tokyo Anthropological Society in December 1886. Agō (1975) speculates that it may be more than 1500 years old. The Japan Exploration Association (1995) associates it with the hexagonal prism records of Assyria.
Japanese paper	About 67 characters in red and a drawing of an Ainu container. Exhibited at the 25th meeting of the Tokyo Anthropological Society in December 1886. Characters traced in Ochiai (1888). Not mentioned in Shōji (1887).
Longsword holder from an Ainu robe (longsword-hanger or Emishi longsword-hanger)	About 23 characters in red. However, Shōji conjectured that some of them were added at a later time. Characters traced in Ochiai (1888).
Earthenware (small jar or teapot)	About 13 characters. Excavated from Yoichi Village, Yoichi District. Characters traced and object sketched in Ochiai (1888). Property of Ōe Taku as of April 1888.
Knot of wood	Inscribed with a total of 7 characters in red. Obtained from an Ainu of Kawa Village in Yoichi District. Characters traced in Ochiai (1888).
Board (wooden board)	About 31 characters in red. Origin as above. Characters traced in Ochiai (1888).
Natural stone: Group 3, Item 1	Total 4 characters in gold on the front, total 11 characters in red on the back. Obtained in February 1887 from an Ainu of Iwanai District. Sketched in Shōji (1887).
Natural stone: Group 3, Item 2	About 25 characters in red. Origin as above. Sketched in Shōji (1887).
Emishi shield	About 32 characters. Sketched in Ochiai (1888). Not mentioned in Shōji (1887).

== Related characters ==
=== Temiya cave drawings ===
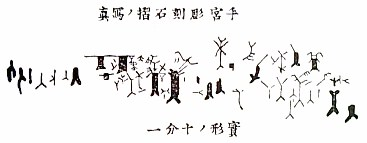
Rock art in Temiya Cave

By one theory, the rock art discovered in 1866 in Temiya Cave actually consists of written characters. These carvings in Otaru are relics of the continuing Jōmon culture which persisted in the region from the 3rd century BC until the 7th century AD, when it was replaced by Satsumon culture. In 1921, they were designated a national historical landmark. (Note: Sekiba Fujihiko and Kyōsuke Kindaichi theorized that the carvings were fabricated by subordinates of Shirano Kaun, but later research has denied the accusation.) They became public knowledge after an 1878 investigation conducted by Enomoto Takeaki, the secretary of the Kaitakushi (Hokkaido Development Commission) Yamanouchi Teiun, and the British geologist John Milne.

In October 1913, the archaeologist Torii Ryūzō contributed an article to Volume 22, Issue 4 of Historical Geography (歴史地理) entitled Concerning Carved Letters in Temiya, Hokkaido (北海道手宮の彫刻文字に就て). He claimed that the letters were in the old Turkic alphabet, representing a Tungusic languages used by the Mohe people. Moreover, the linguist Nakanome Akira contributed an article to the 71st issue of Shōko (尚古), published in February 1918, entitled Ancient Turkic Letters Preserved in Our Country (我国に保存せられたる古代土耳其文字). Adopting Torii's Turkic theory, he claimed to have deciphered the carvings in Temiya Cave, and that in the Mohe language they read: "... We led our subordinates across the great sea ... we fought ... we entered this cave ..." (Note: ……我は部下をひきゐ、おほうみを渡り……たたかひ……此洞穴にいりたり……, (Japanese-language quotation)) In that month's Otaru Shinbun newspaper, Nakanome asserted that the Mishihase people subjugated in the Nihon Shoki by Abe no Hirafu were in fact Mohe people, and that Temiya Cave is the ruins of the burial place of their chief, who died in the conflict.

On the other hand, in 1944, the local historian Fumihiro Asaeda published The Ancient Letters of Otaru (小樽古代文字), in which he propounded a theory that the carvings in Temiya Cavern represented ancient Chinese hanzi. By his theory, they were made by people of the Zhou dynasty court, and record that a fleet dispatched on an expedition was visiting the area when the "emperor" (帝) who led them died and was buried. After some calamity occurred, the Zhou held a bloody ritual. He further conjectured that ships from Shang and later Zhou China frequently visited Hokkaido to obtain deer antlers for use in rituals.

In 1972, Asaeda published a further work in which he indicated three more items he believed to contain characters of the same type. He supposed that all of these were ancient records of ceremonies conducted for the dead.

Item designated by Asaeda	Explanation
Tomioka ancient writing stone	12 letters in black forming 3 lines. Excavated on June 2, 1909, in Inaho, Otaru (future Tomioka, Otaru). Conjectured by Asaeda to contain Chinese characters dating back a little more than 2000 years. The Asian historian Shiratori Kurakichi theorized that it may be a grave marker of the Khitan or Jurchen people. Nishida Shōzō, a professor at the Otaru College of Commerce (小樽高等商業学校), claimed that the writing was seal script written by a Japanese person, and not some other ancient script. He said that the carvings found on cave walls of the kamui-kotan sacred places of the Ainu were likewise not ancient.
Oshoro ancient writing stone	Excavated around 1919 in the Oshoro area of Otaru. Conjectured by Asaeda to contain Chinese characters dating back a little more than 3000 years. In the possession of the Tohoku University Archaeology Lab.
Tomari pictorial writing stone	Discovered on August 14, 1934, in the village of Tomari. Conjectured by Asaeda to contain Chinese characters dating back about 4000 years. In the possession of the Hokkaido University Museum.

The jindai moji researcher Tatsuo Sōma offered another theory in 1978, when he published Reading Japan's Ancient Scripts (解読日本古代文字, Kaidoku Nihon Kodai Moji). He argued that the carvings in Temiya Cave were made by members of a group of people chased from the Hokuriku region by another group of originating in Baekje. He also shared his interpretations of the meanings of the carvings; Unoke, Noto, Kaga, and the other places he refers to by name are all located in modern Ishikawa prefecture.

Destroy our enemies. We entered this cave to use it as a base. Store up military might. Our gods will kill our enemies without fail. (Note: 敵を討て。洞窟に入ったのは、根拠地とするためである。武力を貯えよ。我等の神は、必ずや敵を撃ち殺してくれるぞ。, (Japanese-language quotation))

— Sōma, Tatsuo. 解読日本古代文字 [Reading Japan's Ancient Scripts] (in Japanese). p. 21.

Attack! At Unoke, and Noto and at Ouchi in Kashima in Kaga, and at Nono and Kaga in Kaga. Smash the barriers and important areas and divide them. Strike at Kaga, captured by our foes, shoot through Hakui and Wajima, good lands where the brutes now gather, and set them afire. Noto, which pokes into the sea; how beautiful our birthplaces, Unoke on the plain of Kaga, Nono, Kaga. (Note: 討て！あの宇ノ気、能登地と加賀の鹿島邑知(おうち)、加賀の野野と加賀。関所要所をつぶし分断せよ。占領されている 敵加賀 衝き、畜生奴らが占領している羽咋(はくい)輪島につながる良き地にたむろする奴等を射抜け、焼き討ちにせよ。海につき出た能登、なんともすばらしい我等が故郷(ふるさと) 加賀野の宇ノ気 野野 加賀。, (Japanese-language quotation))

— Sōma, Tatsuo. 解読日本古代文字 [Reading Japan's Ancient Scripts] (in Japanese). p. 22.

=== Fugoppe cave drawings ===
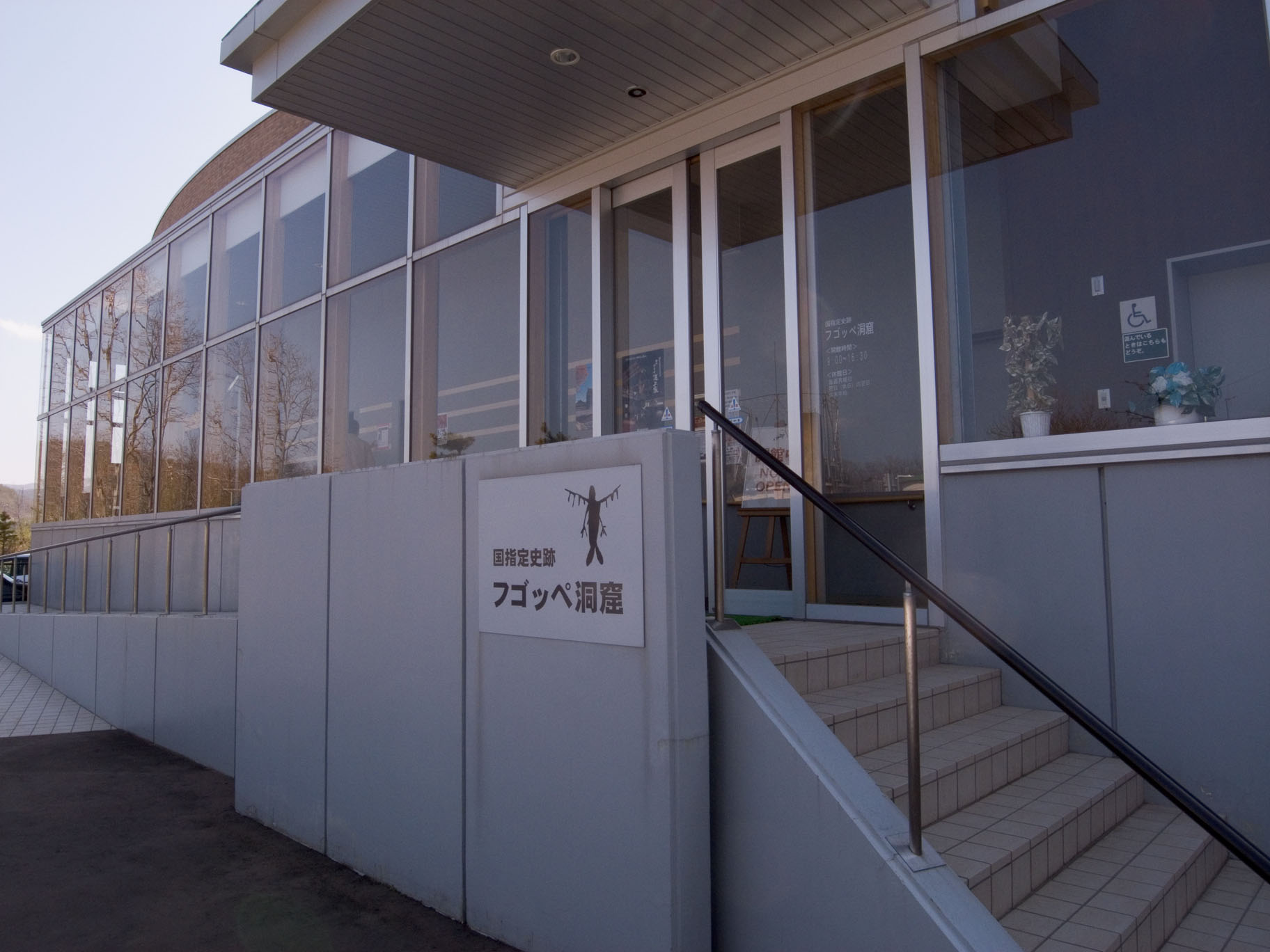
Facility for the protection and display of Fugoppe Cave. Its design completely covers the cave entrance.

In October 1927, rock carvings were discovered on stone walls inside a hill in Fugoppe in the town of Yoichi, by a railroad worker who dug a path through it. Nishida Shōzō, a professor at the Otaru College of Commerce (小樽高等商業学校), called these carvings the "Fugoppe ancient characters", forming a pair with the "Temiya ancient characters" and associating them with the Tsushima characters and old Turkic alphabet. However, the ethnic Ainu folk researcher Hokuto Iboshi argued that the "deformed letters" were instead more recent forgeries, citing their lack of weathering compared to those at Temiya Cave.

Tatsuo Sōma opined that these carvings, like those at Temiya Cave, were made by people driven from the northeast of Honshū. He interpreted their meaning as "Cross the sea and subjugate Suzu. Destroy your enemies and slaughter the brutes." (Note: 海を渡り珠洲を征いよ。敵を討て、畜生どもをぶち殺せ, (Japanese-language quotation))

In 1950, further rock art was discovered in Fugoppe Cave in the same town. These were confirmed, like those at Temiya Cave, to be relics of the continued Jōmon period, and designated as national treasures in 1953. These carvings, like those at Temiya Cave, are sometimes referred to as "ancient characters".

Tatsuo Sōma considered these too as made by the same group that created the carvings at Temiya and at the 1927 Fugoppe discovery. Part of his translation is as follows:

Our prosperous lands of Unoke and Kaga have been stolen by our enemies. Destroy, destroy, destroy our enemies, destroy them completely, smash their castle gates, smash their storehouse gates, one after the other, and thoroughly kill them all. (Note: 敵に奪われている豊かな地、宇気、加賀、その敵を討て、討って、討って、討ちまくれ、城門、倉門、打ち破り、次から次と、徹底的に討ち果たせ, (Japanese-language quotation))

— Sōma, Tatsuo. 解読日本古代文字 [Reading Japan's Ancient Scripts] (in Japanese). p. 40.

Kaga, Nono. Attack and defeat the brutes, o gods.
Strike at Cape Shaku in Suzu, and the eastern seashore of Kanō; pierce through the belt of Ouchi that unites the western shores of Hakui and Wajima and Noto, great gods.
Here swear we, the people of Unoke and Togi.
Our king will sit again at Suzu. (Note: 加賀、野野。神よ討ちぬい、畜生どもを倒せ。 珠洲シャクの地、鹿能の東海岸地を討て、羽咋、輪島、能登の西海岸とを結ぶ邑知地溝帯を討ち抜け、神様。 ここに誓い合うは、宇ノ気と富来(とぎ)の者達であります。 われらが王は珠洲におわす, (Japanese-language quotation))

— Sōma, Tatsuo. 解読日本古代文字 [Reading Japan's Ancient Scripts] (in Japanese). pp. 42–43.

The Japan Exploration Association, chaired by Takahashi Yoshinori, contends that the inscriptions on the northern wall of Fugoppe Cave read as "iishishirai" and "kawasakanahakitsu", and mean respectively "edible beasts live here" and "freshwater fish come here". (Note: These interpretations are based on the tracings in Ochiai (1888).)

== See also ==
- Ainu language#Special katakana for the Ainu language, for the writing used for the modern Ainu language in Hokkaido
