= List of cultural properties of Japan – historical materials (Hokkaido) =

This list is of the cultural properties of Japan designated in the category of historical materials (歴史資料, rekishi shiryō) for the circuit of Hokkaidō.

== National Cultural Properties ==
As of 1 October 2016, six Important Cultural Properties have been designated, being of national significance.

Property	Date	Municipality	Ownership	Comments	Image	Coordinates	Ref.
Materials relating to Kokutai-ji, one of the three government temples of Ezo 蝦夷三官寺国泰寺関係資料; Ezo sankanji Kokutaiji kankei shiryō	Edo period	Akkeshi	Kokutai-ji (国泰寺) (kept at Akkeshi Maritime Affairs Memorial Hall (厚岸町海事記念館))	832 items		43°03′04″N 144°50′57″E	
Materials relating to Zenkō-ji, one of the three government temples of Ezo 蝦夷三官寺善光寺関係資料; Ezo sankanji Zenkōji kankei shiryō	Edo period	Date	Zenkō-ji (善光寺)	62 items		42°31′15″N 140°46′48″E	
Materials relating to Dōju-in, one of the three government temples of Ezo 蝦夷三官寺等澍院関係資料; Ezo sankanji Dōju-in kankei shiryō	Edo period	Samani	Dōju-in (等澍院) (kept at Samani Town Historical Museum (様似郷土館))	16 items		42°07′29″N 142°55′16″E	
Daguerreotype by Eliphalet Brown, Jr. of Matsumae Kageyu and Attendants 銀板写真（松前勘解由と従者像）〈エリファレット・ブラウン・ジュニア撮影／一八五四年〉 ginban shashin (Matsumae Kageyu to jūsha zō) (Erifaretto Buraun junia satsuei 1854 nen)	1854	Matsumae	Matsumae Town Historical Museum (松前町郷土資料館)			41°26′08″N 140°06′43″E	
Daguerreotype by Eliphalet Brown, Jr. of Ishizuka Kanzō and Attendants 銀板写真（石塚官蔵と従者像）〈エリファレット・ブラウン・ジュニア撮影／一八五四年〉 ginban shashin (Ishizuka Kanzō to jūsha zō) (Erifaretto Buraun junia satsuei 1854 nen)	1854	Hakodate	Hakodate City Museum (市立函館博物館)			41°45′21″N 140°42′53″E	
Documents of the Hakodate Bugyō Office 箱館奉行所文書; Hakodate bugyō-sho monjo	Edo period	Sapporo	The Archives of Hokkaido (北海道立文書館)	167 items		43°03′52″N 141°20′49″E	

== Prefectural Cultural Properties ==
Property	Date	Municipality	Ownership	Comments	Image	Coordinates	Ref.
Illustrated Tales of the Tondenhei - Tondenhei Emaki 屯田兵絵物語附屯田絵巻; Tondenhei e-monogatari tsuketari tonden e-maki	Taishō era to 1943	Asahikawa	Asahikawa Tondenhei Village Museum	one volume plus four scrolls		43°46′10″N 142°26′32″E	
Documents of the Takikawa Tondenhei 滝川屯田兵文書; Takikawa tondenhei bunsho	Meiji era	Takikawa	Takikawa Local History Museum	sixty-one items		43°33′07″N 141°55′03″E	
Records of the Tondenhei Village at Shinkotoni 新琴似村屯田兵村記録; Shinkotoni-mura tondenhei-son kiroku	1888–1928	Sapporo					

== Municipal Cultural Properties ==
As of 1 May 2016, twenty-nine properties have been designated at a municipal level.

Property	Date	Municipality	Ownership	Comments	Image	Dimensions	Coordinates	Ref.
Materials relating to Takabatake Toshiyoshi 高畑利宜資料; Takabatake Toshiyoshi shiryō	1841-1922	Takikawa	Takikawa Local History Museum (滝川市郷土館)				43°33′07″N 141°55′03″E	for all refs see
Materials relating to the Hokkaido Synthetic Oil Company Takikawa Plant 北海道人造石油株式会社 滝川工場関係資料; Hokkaidō jinzō sekiyu kabushikigaisha Takigawa kōjō kankei shiryō	Shōwa period	Takikawa	Takikawa Local History Museum (滝川市郷土館)	194 items including 164 documents, 17 drawings, 10 flow sheets, and 3 objects; the plant was established in 1938 to produce synthetic fuel through coal liquefaction			43°33′07″N 141°55′03″E	
Historical materials relating to Sapporo Village and Ōtomo Kametarō 札幌村・大友亀太郎関係歴史資料; Sapporo-mura・Ōtomo Kametarō kankei rekishi shiryō	1866-	Sapporo	Sapporo-mura Historical Museum (札幌村郷土記念館)				43°04′50″N 141°22′36″E	
Documents of the Kaneko Family (Documents relating to the former Bannaguro Village Council) 金子家文書(旧花畔村村会関係文書); Kaneko-ke monjo (kyū-Bannaguro-mura sonkai kankei monjo)	Meiji period	Ishikari	Ishikari Sakyū-no-Kaze Museum (いしかり砂丘の風資料館)				43°10′17″N 141°18′56″E	
Origins of the Pioneers (old documents) 開拓起源(古文書); Kaitaku kigen (komonjo)	Meiji period	Niki		1911 copy of the records of Niki Takeyoshi (仁木竹吉)			43°09′08″N 140°45′51″E	
Posthumous collection of Niki Takeyoshi, Founder of Niki Village (old documents) 仁木村開祖者仁木竹吉翁遺稿集(古文書); Niki-mura kaisosha Niki Takeyoshi okina ikō-shū (komonjo)	1875-1911	Niki					43°09′08″N 140°45′51″E	
Household register of Tottori Village 鳥取村本籍簿; Tottori-mura honseki-bo	1884-5	Kushiro	Kushiro District Bureau of Legal Affairs (釧路地方法務局)				42°59′11″N 144°22′40″E	
Diary of Nagakubo Hidejirō 永久保秀二郎日誌; Nagakubo Hidejirō nisshi		Kushiro	Kushiro City Library (市立釧路図書館)				42°58′44″N 144°23′10″E	
Kushiro Shimbun 釧路新聞; Kushiro shinbun	1902-42	Kushiro	Kushiro City Board of Education Lifelong Learning Division (釧路市教育委員会生涯学習課)	became the Hokkaido Shimbun in 1942			42°58′54″N 144°23′00″E	
Furnishings, paintings, and documents of Kokutai-ji 国泰寺什器書画古文書; Kokutaiji jūki shoga komonjo		Akkeshi	Kokutai-ji (国泰寺), Akkeshi Town Historical Museum (厚岸町郷土館)				43°01′55″N 144°50′18″E	
Documents of the Kaga Family 加賀家文書; Kaga-ke monjo	Kansei era to early Meiji period	Betsukai	Kaga Family Archives (加賀家文書館)				43°23′50″N 145°07′22″E	

== See also ==
- Cultural Properties of Japan
- List of National Treasures of Japan (historical materials)
- List of Historic Sites of Japan (Hokkaidō)
- Hokkaido Museum
