= Akkeshi Town Historical Museum =

- 厚岸町郷土館
- Interactive map of the Akkeshi Town Historical Museum area

General information
- Location: 1-2 Wangetsu, Akkeshi, Hokkaidō, Japan
- Coordinates: 43°01′58″N 144°50′21″E
- Opened: 1967

Website
- Official website

Akkeshi Town Historical Museum (厚岸町郷土館, Akkeshi-chō Kyōdokan) opened in Akkeshi, Hokkaidō, Japan in 1967. Situated in the immediate vicinity of Kokutai-ji (国泰寺) and Akkeshi Jinja (厚岸神社), the collections document the history of the area and include Jōmon and Zoku-Jōmon ceramics; Ainu materials, including a makiri (マキリ) scabbard and a kiseru or smoking pipe obtained through trade with the Wajin; items dedicated at Shinmei-gū (神明宮), the predecessor shrine to Akkeshi Jinja established by Mogami Tokunai in 1791; documents from Kokutai-ji that have been designated an Important Cultural Property, including a temple diary with records of the tsunami resulting from the 1843 Tokachi-oki Earthquake (ja) and of the 1850 shipwreck of the Australian whaler Eamont; and an ema depicting Katō Kiyomasa dedicated by retainers of the Sendai Domain when charged with the safeguarding of much of Ezo after the transfer of responsibility from the Matsumae Domain to the shogunate during the Bakumatsu period.

== See also ==
- Hokkaido Museum
- Akkeshi Maritime Affairs Memorial Museum
- Akkeshi Town Ōta Tonden Kaitaku Memorial Museum
- List of Historic Sites of Japan (Hokkaidō)
- List of Cultural Properties of Japan - historical materials (Hokkaidō)
