= Takikawa Local History Museum =

Museum in Hokkaidō, Japan

- 滝川市郷土館
- Takikawa City Local History Museum in 2025.

General information
- Location: 3-8-20 Shinmachi, Takikawa, Hokkaidō, Hokkaidō, Japan
- Coordinates: 43°33′07″N 141°55′03″E
- Opened: 1977

Website
- Official website

Takikawa Local History Museum (滝川市郷土館, Takikawa-shi Kyōdokan) opened in Takikawa, Hokkaidō, Japan in 1977. It is dedicated to the history and ways of life of the area and includes exhibits on Takabatake Toshiyoshi (高畑利宜), the Prefectural Cultural Property Documents of the Takikawa tondenhei, and an annex comprising a tondenhei house.

== See also ==
- List of Cultural Properties of Japan - historical materials (Hokkaidō)
- Takikawa Museum of Art and Natural History
