= Asahikawa Tondenhei Village Museum =

- 旭川兵村記念館
- Interactive map of the Asahikawa Tondenhei Village Museum area

General information
- Location: 6-3-26 Minami 1, Higashi-Asahikawa, Asahikawa, Hokkaidō, Japan
- Coordinates: 43°46′10″N 142°26′32″E
- Opened: April 1982

Website
- Official website

Asahikawa Tondenhei Village Museum (旭川兵村記念館, Asahikawa Heison Kinenkan) opened in Asahikawa, Hokkaidō, Japan in 1982. The exhibits include a recreated tondenhei house as well as farming implements, clothes, and documents drawn from the museum's 2,500 objects, among them the Prefectural Cultural Property Illustrated Tales of the Tondenhei - Tondenhei emaki.

== See also ==
- List of Cultural Properties of Japan - historical materials (Hokkaidō)
- List of Historic Sites of Japan (Hokkaidō)
- Historical Village of Hokkaido
- Hokkaido Museum
- Asahikawa Museum of Sculpture
