= Akkeshi Town Ōta Tonden Kaitaku Memorial Museum =

- 厚岸町太田屯田開拓記念館
- Interactive map of the Akkeshi Town Ōta Tonden Kaitaku Memorial Museum area

General information
- Location: 23-1 Ōta, Akkeshi, Hokkaidō, Japan
- Coordinates: 43°05′36″N 144°47′17″E
- Opened: May 1991

Website
- Official website

Akkeshi Town Ōta Tonden Kaitaku Memorial Museum (厚岸町太田屯田開拓記念館, Akkeshi-chō Kaiji Kinenkan) opened in Akkeshi, Hokkaidō, Japan in 1991 to commemorate the centenary of the settlement of Tondenhei "pioneers" in Ōta.

== See also ==
- Hokkaido Museum
- Hokkaidō Development Commission
- Akkeshi Maritime Affairs Memorial Museum
