= Kondei =

Historical Japanese militia

The kondei (健兒; lit. 'able-bodied youth') system was an institution developed by the Japanese Imperial court in Nara during the Nara and early Heian periods for the conscription and regulation of local paramilitary or militia forces. The kondei system was divided into regional administrative divisions overseen by kondeidokoro (健兒所; lit. 'kondei office').

== Early history ==
The term "kondei" appears for the first time in the Nihon Shoki, although glossed as the native Japanese word chikarahito (ちからひと; lit. 'strong man'), in the record for the 22nd day of the 7th month of 642 AD, the first year of the reign of Empress Kōgyoku.

[The Empress] commanded chikarahito to wrestle (sumahi) in the presence of Gyōki [of Baekje]...
乃ち健兒に命せて、翹岐が前に相撲とらしむ…

Later, in the record for the 13th day of the 8th month of 669 AD, second year of the reign of Emperor Tenji, it appears again in reference to Japanese forces who had been sent to rescue the Korean kingdom of Baekje:

I have heard that kimi Iohara [no Omitari], rescuing general of the land of Great Yamato, went across the sea with more than 10,000 kondei...
今聞く、大日本國の救將廬原君臣、健兒萬餘を率て、正に海を越えて至らむ…

== Later development ==
Under the Ritsuryō system, which began to be fully implemented in the early 8th century, military and paramilitary militia units were to be established throughout the country for the defense of the state. Kondei militia were typically raised in the interior of the country where military preparedness and quality of troops was not as important. In outlying areas, such as Sado Island and the Saikaidō, where the court feared foreign invasion, professional troops drawn from the martial aristocracy were deployed instead. However, according to the Engishiki, kondei were deployed to Sado in the early 10th century.

Over time, the kondei evolved from peasant-soldiers on foot to horseback archers whose prestige rivalled that of the martial aristocracy itself. It is believed that the impetus for this evolution was the court's urgent need to counter the advanced horsemanship of the Emishi, against which the early kondei footsoldiers had little effectiveness. The later mounted kondei, especially the well-regarded kyūba no shi (弓馬の士), have been suggested as prototypes of the later samurai.

== See also ==
- Sakimori, another ancient Japanese militia serving as coast-watchers
- Tondenhei
- Sonae (military unit), the basic operational unit of medieval Japanese footsoldiers
