= Zenkō-ji (Date) =

Buddhist temple in Akkeshi, Hokkaido, Japan

- 善光寺
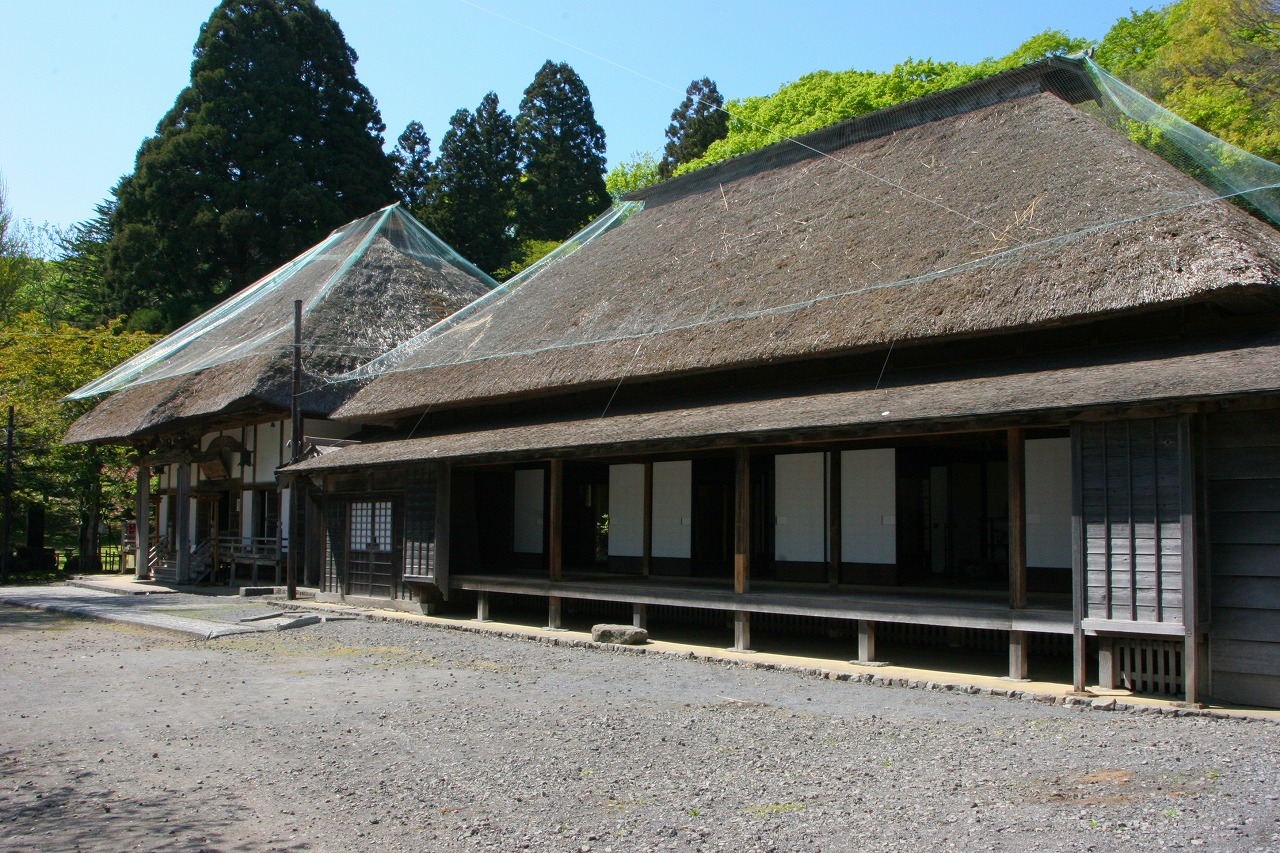
- Zenkō-ji

- Location within Hokkaido Location within Japan

Religion
- Affiliation: Buddhist
- Deity: Amida Nyorai
- Rite: Jōdō-shū
- Status: active

Location
- Location: 1124 Usu-cho, Date-shi, Hokkaido
- Country: Japan
- Interactive map of Zenkō-ji
- Coordinates: 42°31′16″N 140°46′04″E

Architecture
- Completed: 1804
- National Important Cultural Property National Historic Site }

Zenkō-ji (有珠善光寺, Usu Zenkō-ji) is a Buddhist temple located in the Usu neighborhood of the city of Date, Hokkaido, Japan. It belongs to the Jōdō-shū sect of Japanese Buddhism and its honzon is a statue of Amida Nyorai. The temple has been designed a National Historic Site since 1974.

== Overview ==
Along with Kokutai-ji in Akkeshi Tōjū-in in Samani, Zenkō-ji in Date was counted as one of the three official temples in Ezo. According to legend, the temple was founded in 826 during the Heian period when Ennin, a monk from Mount Hiei, built a hall in Usu County, Iburi Province, and enshrined the principal image of Amida Buddha, which he had personally carved. Although there is no documentary or physical evidence to support this legend, in 1613 Matsumae Yoshihiro, the daimyō of Matsumae Domain built at Nyōrin-dō chapel and renamed the temple " Zenkō-ji". The subsequent rulers of Matsumae Domain continued to support the temple, repairing or rebuilding after various fires or natural disasters. In 1804, Shogun Tokugawa Ienari designated it as an official temple for the purpose of coordinating educational and legal activities in Ezo as concerns increased over the increasingly aggressive activities of the Russian Empire in the waters off Hokkaido.Records from 1806 describe the Main Hall, priests' quarters, guardian shrine, Atago Hall, Shaka-dō, Kyōzō, and wooden storehouse.The temple was destroyed in 1822 and damaged again severely in 1853 by eruptions of nearby Mount Usu. The current Main Hall dates from the 1836 reconstruction. The temple grounds were designated a Hokkaido Historic Site in 1950, and a National Historic Site in 1974. Extensive restoration work was undertaken in 1988 and 2018, when the temple was designated a Hokkaido Heritage Site.

The temple is about a 25-minute walk from Usu Station on the JR Hokkaido Muroran Main Line.

== Cultural Properties ==
=== Important Cultural Properties ===
Materials Related to Zenkoji Temple, One of the Three Official Temples of Ezo (蝦夷三官寺善光寺関係資料, Ezo San Kan Tera Zenkōji Kankei Shiryō) - In 2005, 62 items, including woodblock prints, sutras, documents, and utensils, were collectively designated an Important Cultural Property

=== Hokkaido Designated Cultural Properties ===
- Statue of standing Shaka Nyorai (釈迦如来立像[), Edo period;
- Statue of seated Kannon Bosatsu by Enkū (円空作仏像聖観音像[), Edo period (1663);

== See also ==
- List of Historic Sites of Japan (Hokkaido)
