= Akkeshi Maritime Affairs Memorial Museum =

Museum in Akkeshi, Hokkaidō, Japan

- 厚岸町海事記念館
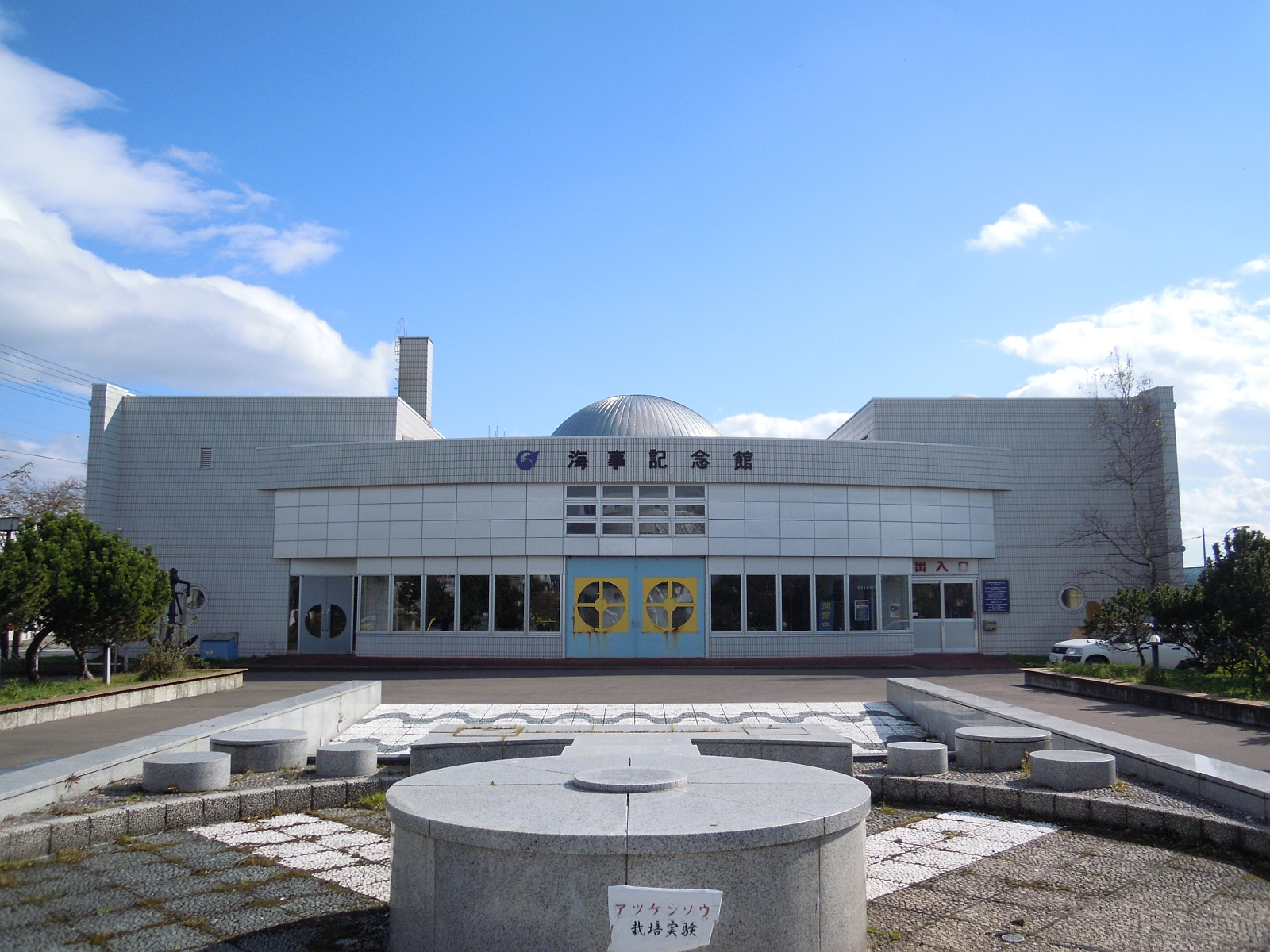
- Interactive map of the Akkeshi Maritime Affairs Memorial Museum area

General information
- Location: 3-4 Shinei, Akkeshi, Hokkaidō, Japan
- Coordinates: 43°03′04″N 144°50′57″E
- Opened: 1 October 1988

Website
- Official website

Akkeshi Maritime Affairs Memorial Museum (厚岸町海事記念館, Akkeshi-chō Kaiji Kinenkan) is a registered museum that opened in Akkeshi, Hokkaidō, Japan in 1988. The displays document the relationship between the town and the sea, with a particular focus on the fishing industry, and there is also a planetarium.

== See also ==
- Hokkaido Museum
- Lake Akkeshi
