= Lake Akkeshi =

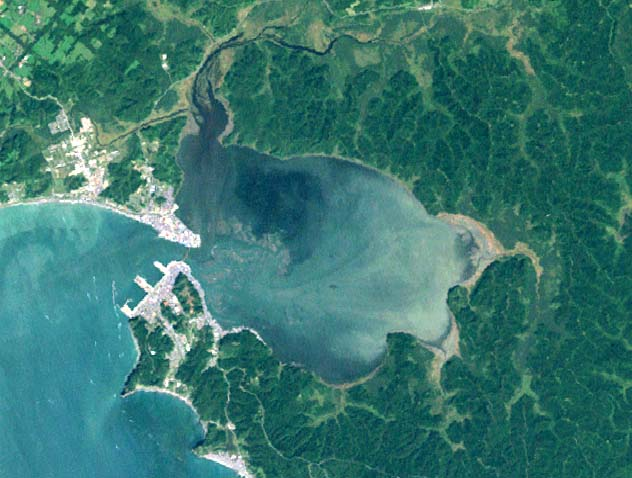
- Lake Akkeshi

- Location within Japan
- Location: Hokkaidō, Japan
- Coordinates: 43°03′N 144°54′E
- Type: brackish lake
- Primary inflows: Bekanbeushi River
- Surface area: 32.31 km^{2} (12.47 sq mi)
- Max. depth: 11 metres (36 ft)

Akkeshi-ko (厚岸湖) is a brackish lake near Akkeshi in Hokkaidō, Japan. The wetlands of Lake Akkeshi and Bekanbeushi Marsh (別寒辺牛湿原) have been designated a Ramsar site.

== Wetlands ==
Designations

Ramsar Wetland
- Official name: Akkeshi-ko and Bekambeushi-shitsugen
- Designated: 10 June 1993
- Reference no.: 614

Lake Akkeshi, 11 metres (36 ft) deep at its deepest point, is fed by the Bekanbeushi River (別寒辺牛川) and adjoins Akkeshi Bay. It is surrounded by salt marsh, fens, and bogs.

== Birds ==
Since a part of this lake does not freeze, whooper swans and ducks winter there. The white-tailed eagle and Steller's sea eagle also visit. There is a 381ha Japanese crane sanctuary.

== Sustainable use ==
Fishing and the aquaculture of oysters and clams occur in the lake.

== See also ==
- Ramsar sites in Japan
