= Kokutai-ji (Akkeshi) =

Buddhist temple in Akkeshi, Hokkaido, Japan

- 国泰寺
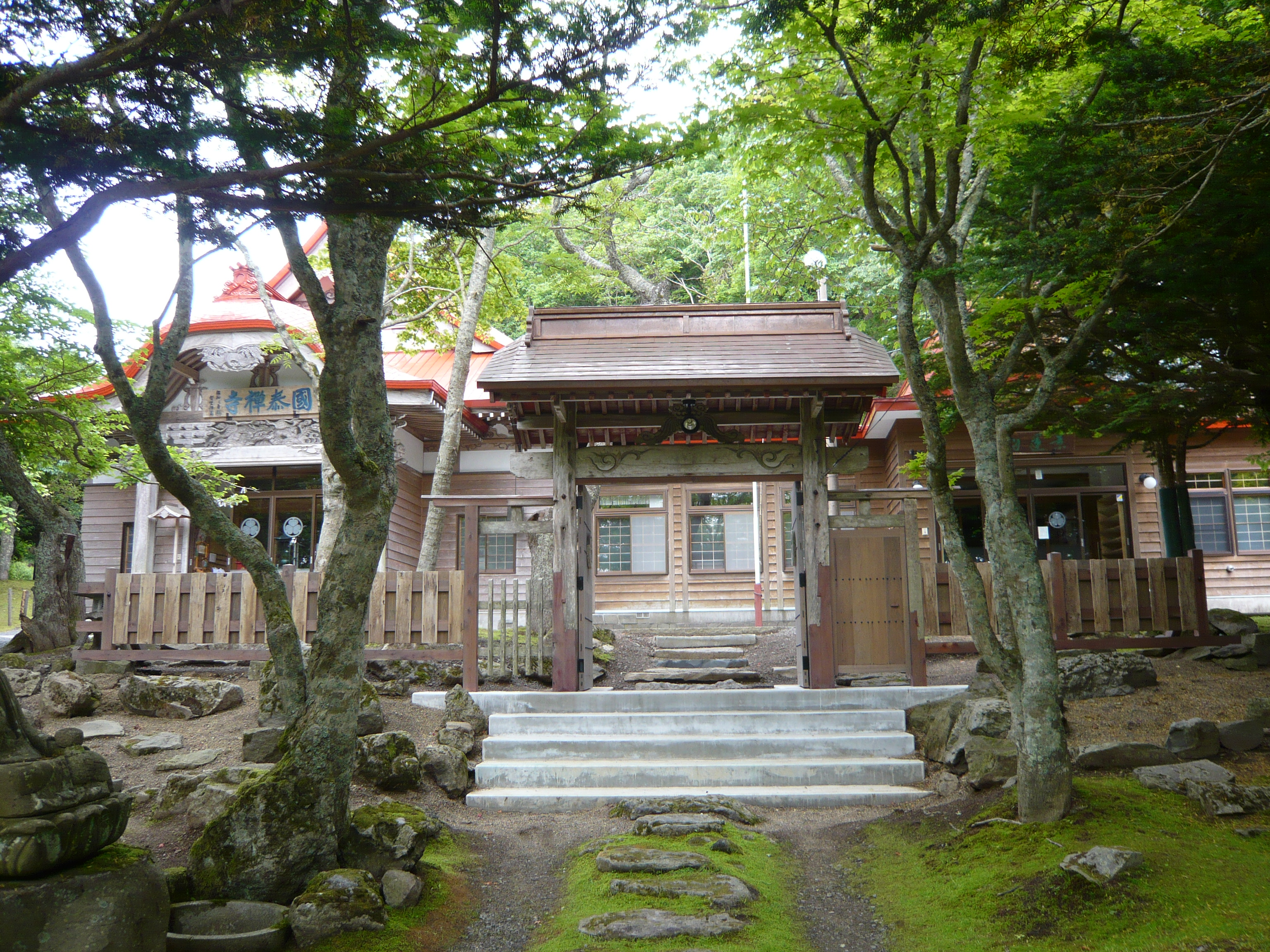
- Kokutai-ji

- Location within Hokkaido Location within Japan

Religion
- Affiliation: Buddhist
- Rite: Rinzai school
- Status: active

Location
- Location: 1 Chome-15 Wangetsu, Akkeshi-cho, Akkeshi-gun, Hokkaido 088–1114
- Country: Japan
- Interactive map of Kokutai-ji
- Coordinates: 43°01′55.13″N 144°50′18.23″E

Architecture
- Completed: 1804
- National Historic Site }

Kokutai-ji (国泰寺) is a Buddhist temple located in the Wangetsu-cho neighborhood of the town of Akkeshi, Hokkaido, Japan. It belongs to the Nanzen-ji branch of the Rinzai school of Japanese Zen. The temple has been designated a National Historic Site since 1973. The "Documents Related to Kokutai-ji Temple, One of the Three Official Temples of Ezo," is an Important Cultural Property.

== Overview ==
Along with Zenko-ji in Date Toju-in in Samani-cho, Kokutai-ji in Akkeshi was counted as one of the three official temples in Ezo. All three temples were built by the Tokugawa shogunate in 1804 for the purpose of coordinating educational and legal activities in Ezo as concerns increased over the increasingly aggressive activities of the Russian Empire in the waters off Hokkaido. The temple was founded on a windbreak forest of 10 square chō that included the site of a Shinto shrine, the Shinmei-gu (the predecessor of Akkeshi Shrine, built in Mogami Tokunai in 1791) on Cape Barasan, which juts out into Akkeshi Bay. The current temple has undergone since its original construction, but the Sanmon gate, Main Hall, stone Kannon Bosatsu made in 1835, a stone stupa built in 1842, and the graves of past chief priests remain.

== See also ==
- List of Historic Sites of Japan (Hokkaido)
