= Akkeshi =

Akkeshi 厚岸町 Akkeshi-chō
- Town
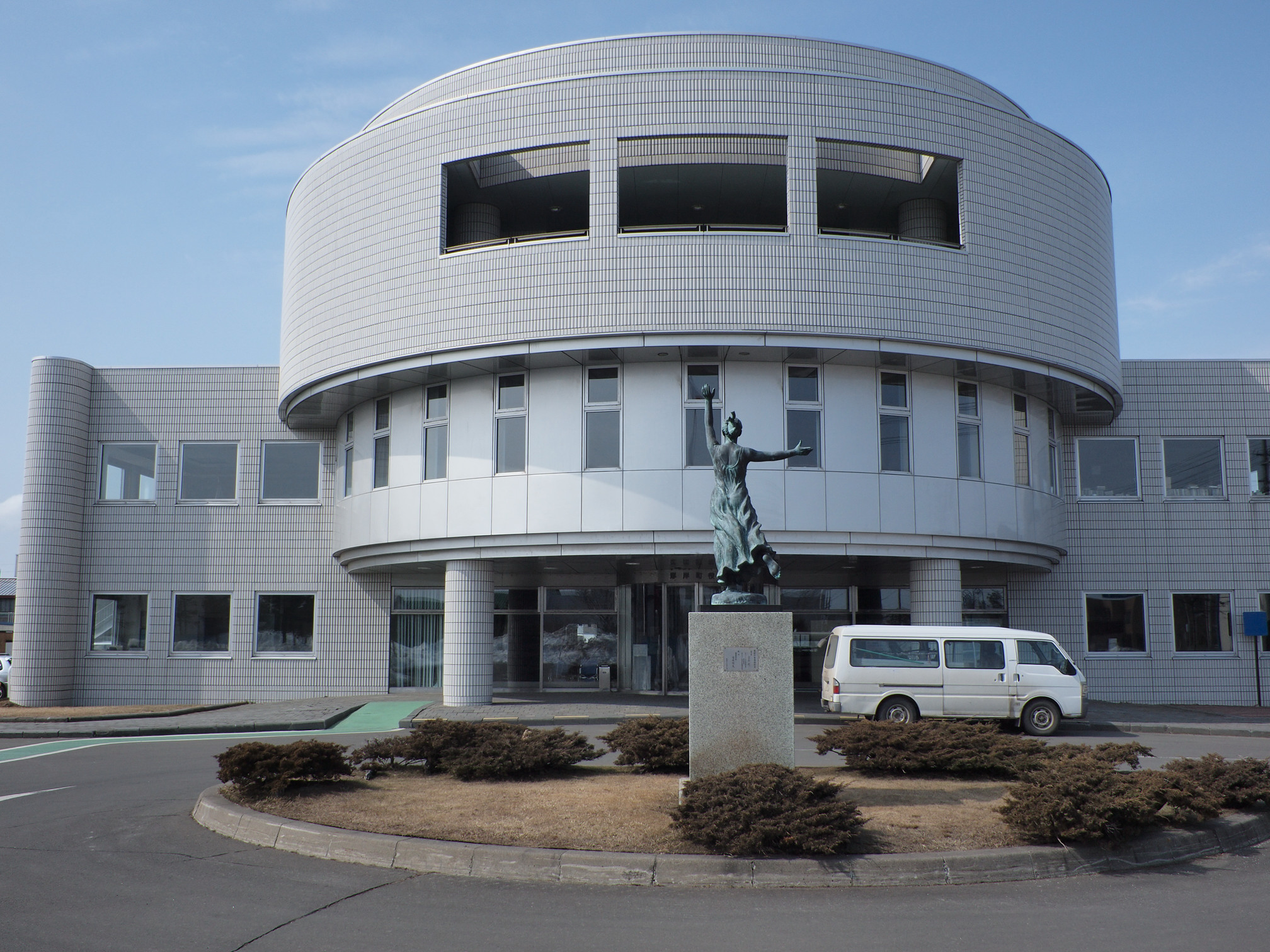
- Akkeshi Town Hall

- Flag Emblem

- Location of Akkeshi in Hokkaido (Kushiro Subprefecture)

- Coordinates: 43°3′N 144°51′E
- Country: Japan
- Region: Hokkaido
- Prefecture: Hokkaido (Kushiro Subprefecture)
- District: Akkeshi
- Established: 1900

Area
  - Total: 739.12 km^{2} (285.38 sq mi)

Population (October 31, 2025)
  - Total: 8,059
  - Density: 10.90/km^{2} (28.24/sq mi)
- Time zone: UTC+09:00 (JST)
- City hall address: 3-1 Mae, Akkeshi-chō, Akkeshi-gun, Hokkaidō 088-1192
- Climate: Dfb
- Website: www.akkeshi-town.jp
- Symbols
- Bird: Slaty-backed gull
- Flower: Arctic Iris
- Tree: North Japanese hill cherry

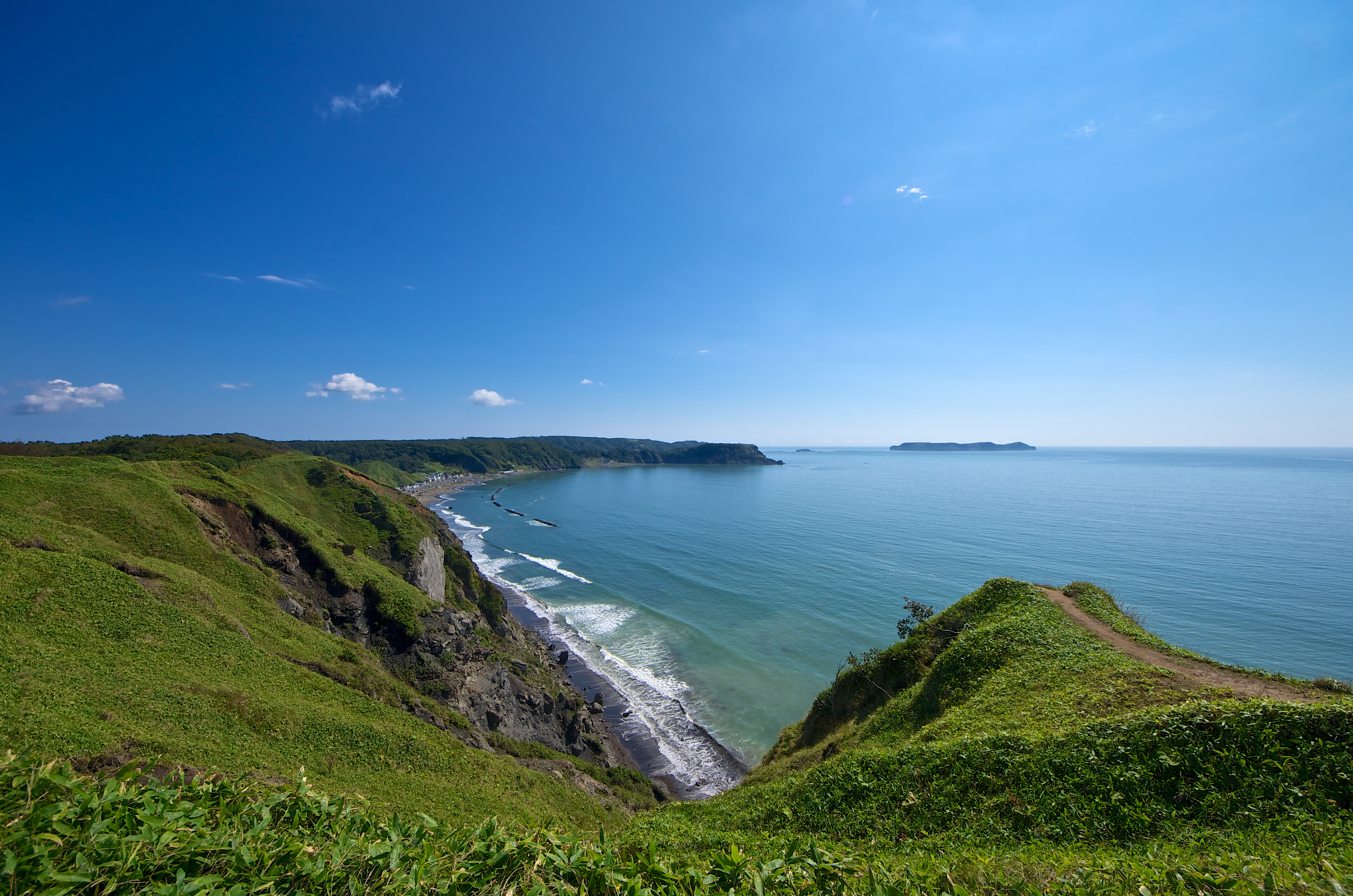
Aikapppu

Akkeshi (厚岸町, Akkeshi-chō) is a town located in Kushiro Subprefecture, Hokkaidō, Japan. As of 31 October 2025, the town had an estimated population of 8059 in 4251 households, and a population density of 10.9 people per km^{2}. The total area of the town is 739.12 km^{2} (285.38 sq mi).

== Geography ==
Akkeshi is located in southeastern Hokkaido. Akkeshi Bay, a natural harbor, extends deeply into Lake Akkeshi. The town measures 35.5 kilometers east-to-west and 45.1 kilometers north-to-south, approximately 48 kilometers from Kushiro and 78 kilometers from Nemuro. The highest elevation is 156 meters. The area is covered with hills and marshes rising from 60 to 80 meters. The Pacific coast is rich in unusually shaped rocks, and at the mouth of Akkeshi Bay are the uninhabited Daikoku Island and other small islands. Daikoku Island is a breeding habitat for Leach's storm petrel, Slaty-backed gull, Japanese Cormorant, and Spectacled guillemot and is designated a national Natural Monument and national "Special Wildlife Protection Area." In addition, Lake Akkeshi and Bekambeushi are registered under the Ramsar Convention as the Lake Akkeshi-Bekambeushi Marsh. The area from Kushiro to Hamanaka Town adjacent to Akkeshi is part of the Akkeshi-Kiritappu-Konbumori Quasi-National Park.

=== Neighboring municipalities ===
  - Hamanaka
  - Kushiro
  - Shibecha
  - Betsukai

=== Climate ===
Spring begins around mid-May, with continuous sunny days. From June to August, the region's characteristic sea fog is likely to occur, resulting in cool summers with low-temperature rain and fog. Autumn brings clear skies due to a mobile high pressure system, but heavy rainfall. Winter brings dry air due to northwesterly winds. Snowfall occurs relatively late and with little snowfall, but the ground freezes severely.

Climate data for Ohta（1991 – 2020）
| Month | Jan | Feb | Mar | Apr | May | Jun | Jul | Aug | Sep | Oct | Nov | Dec | Year |
|---|---|---|---|---|---|---|---|---|---|---|---|---|---|
| Record high °C (°F) | 7.9 (46.2) | 12.3 (54.1) | 15.4 (59.7) | 24.7 (76.5) | 34.6 (94.3) | 32.2 (90.0) | 33.2 (91.8) | 34.7 (94.5) | 31.6 (88.9) | 24.4 (75.9) | 20.1 (68.2) | 13.0 (55.4) | 34.7 (94.5) |
| Mean daily maximum °C (°F) | −1.5 (29.3) | −1.2 (29.8) | 2.6 (36.7) | 8.4 (47.1) | 13.5 (56.3) | 16.5 (61.7) | 20.2 (68.4) | 22.0 (71.6) | 19.9 (67.8) | 14.7 (58.5) | 8.2 (46.8) | 1.4 (34.5) | 10.4 (50.7) |
| Daily mean °C (°F) | −5.8 (21.6) | −5.6 (21.9) | −1.6 (29.1) | 3.5 (38.3) | 8.3 (46.9) | 11.9 (53.4) | 15.8 (60.4) | 17.7 (63.9) | 15.4 (59.7) | 10.0 (50.0) | 3.6 (38.5) | −3.0 (26.6) | 5.8 (42.4) |
| Mean daily minimum °C (°F) | −10.7 (12.7) | −10.7 (12.7) | −6.0 (21.2) | −0.9 (30.4) | 3.8 (38.8) | 8.2 (46.8) | 12.6 (54.7) | 14.5 (58.1) | 11.4 (52.5) | 4.9 (40.8) | −1.3 (29.7) | −7.8 (18.0) | 1.5 (34.7) |
| Record low °C (°F) | −23.3 (−9.9) | −24.2 (−11.6) | −19.5 (−3.1) | −9.9 (14.2) | −5.1 (22.8) | −1.0 (30.2) | 4.4 (39.9) | 5.0 (41.0) | 2.1 (35.8) | −4.2 (24.4) | −13.0 (8.6) | −18.0 (−0.4) | −24.2 (−11.6) |
| Average precipitation mm (inches) | 39.7 (1.56) | 26.3 (1.04) | 58.4 (2.30) | 86.1 (3.39) | 114.9 (4.52) | 122.8 (4.83) | 130.7 (5.15) | 154.3 (6.07) | 185.4 (7.30) | 131.5 (5.18) | 79.8 (3.14) | 65.5 (2.58) | 1,195.2 (47.06) |
| Average snowfall cm (inches) | 91 (36) | 79 (31) | 91 (36) | 34 (13) | 1 (0.4) | 0 (0) | 0 (0) | 0 (0) | 0 (0) | 0 (0) | 9 (3.5) | 72 (28) | 370 (146) |
| Average precipitation days (≥ 1.0 mm) | 6.2 | 5.2 | 8.0 | 9.4 | 10.3 | 10.1 | 11.4 | 12.5 | 12.1 | 9.7 | 8.9 | 7.7 | 111.6 |
| Mean monthly sunshine hours | 184.6 | 171.5 | 189.3 | 174.2 | 172.6 | 133.4 | 113.5 | 120.8 | 141.7 | 171.5 | 167.9 | 168.2 | 1,914.9 |
Source 1: Japan Meteorological Agency
Source 2: JMA

=== Demographics ===
Per Japanese census data, the population of Akkeshi has declined in recent decades.

Historical population
| Year | Pop. | ±% |
|---|---|---|
| 1970 | 18,114 | — |
| 1980 | 15,940 | −12.0% |
| 1990 | 14,093 | −11.6% |
| 2000 | 12,307 | −12.7% |
| 2010 | 10,630 | −13.6% |
| 2020 | 8,892 | −16.3% |

== History ==
Remains of dwellings from the early to middle Jomon period have been found within the town, indicating that people have been living in the area for approximately 6,000 years. During the Edo period, various records by Japanese people, including Matsuura Takeshiro, record that Ainu people lived in settlements in various locations. The name "Akkeshi" is believed to derive from "Akkeushii" (meaning "skin of the elm," "to peel," "place,") or "akkeshito" (meaning "elm," "under," "swamp") in the Ainu language. The name "Akkeshi" first appeared in literature during the Kan'ei era in an article about Matsumae Domain opening a trading post, but the oldest record of the people living in Akkeshi is stored in the National Archives of the Netherlands. In 1643, the Castricum, commanded by Captain Maarten Gerritszoon Vries of the Dutch East India Company, docked in Akkeshi and left a voyage record of what Akkeshi looked like at the time. Akkeshi's natural harbor was a frequent destination for foreign ships, including Dutch, Russian, Australian, and French, and it served as a point of contact with other countries. It also served as a trading post between the Ainu and Japanese, who relied on the city's abundant marine resources, and as a transit point between Matsumae, Nemuro, and the Kuril Islands. The surveyor Ino Tadataka stayed in Akkeshi in 1800. The temple of Kokutai-ji, one of the three official temples of Ezo under the Tokugawa shogunate was constructed in 1804. Akkeshi was the site of a skirmish between the crew of the Australian whaler Lady Rowena and local inhabitants in 1831. In 1859, Akkeshi came under the control of Sendai Domain, and under Saga Domain from 1869 to 1871.

Following the Meiji restoration, in 1872 the area came under the control of the Akkeshi Customs Office of the Hokkaido Development Commission and was part of Nemuro Subprefecture from 1873. In 1890, under the Ota Village was established in Akkeshi County, with 440 households of former samurai from various prefectures settled there as tondenhei garrison soldiers. A lighthouse (Akkeshi Lighthouse) was established on Daikoku Island. With the implementation of the first class town and village system in 1900, four towns and seven villages merged to form Akkeshi Town. Akkeshi Station was inaugurated in 1917. In 1935, the Japanese composer Akira Ifukube received the first prize for his first orchestral work 'Japanese Rhapsody' in an international contest for young composers promoted by Alexander Tcherepnin .

== Government ==
Akkeshi has a mayor-council form of government with a directly elected mayor and a unicameral town council of 13 members. Akkeshi, as part of Kushiro Subprefecture, contributes one member to the Hokkaidō Prefectural Assembly. In terms of national politics, the town is part of the Hokkaidō 7th district of the lower house of the Diet of Japan.

== Economy ==
Commercial fishing is Akkeshi's core industry, broadly divided into offshore fishing for salmon and saury and aquaculture, mainly oyster farming. There is a well-developed seafood processing industry, as well as refrigeration-related industries. Agriculture is centered around dairy farming. The town is also one of Hokkaido's leading producers of fresh shiitake mushrooms. The Akkeshi distillery, which produces the popular Akkeshi Whisky.

== Education ==
Akkeshi has three public elementary schools, three public middle schools, one public combined elementary/middle school and one public high school. The Akkeshi Marine Research Station, Field Science Center for Northern Biosphere, Hokkaido University is located in the town.

== Transportation ==
JR Hokkaido – Nemuro Main Line

■ Kami-Oboro – Oboro – Monshizu – Akkeshi

=== Highways ===
- National Route 44

== Sister city relations ==
- – City of Clarence, Tasmania, Australia, established on February 9, 1982. On April 11, 1850, villagers rescued 32 crew members from the Clarance-based whaling ship Eamont, which was shipwrecked off the coast of Suehiro. This fact became widely known through the book "The Mysterious Foreign Ship" by Masako Endo in 1981, and the sister city relationship was established.

== Local attractions ==
- Kokutai-ji (National Historic Site)
- Akkeshi Maritime Affairs Memorial Museum
- Akkeshi Town Historical Museum
- Akkeshi Town Ōta Tonden Kaitaku Memorial Museum
- Akkeshi-Kiritappu-Konbumori Quasi-National Park
- Lake Akkeshi

Shinryu, the northern part of the town is linked to Honcho, the southern part, by a bridge offering a scenic view of the lagoon which separates both parts. The length of the bridge is 456 m.

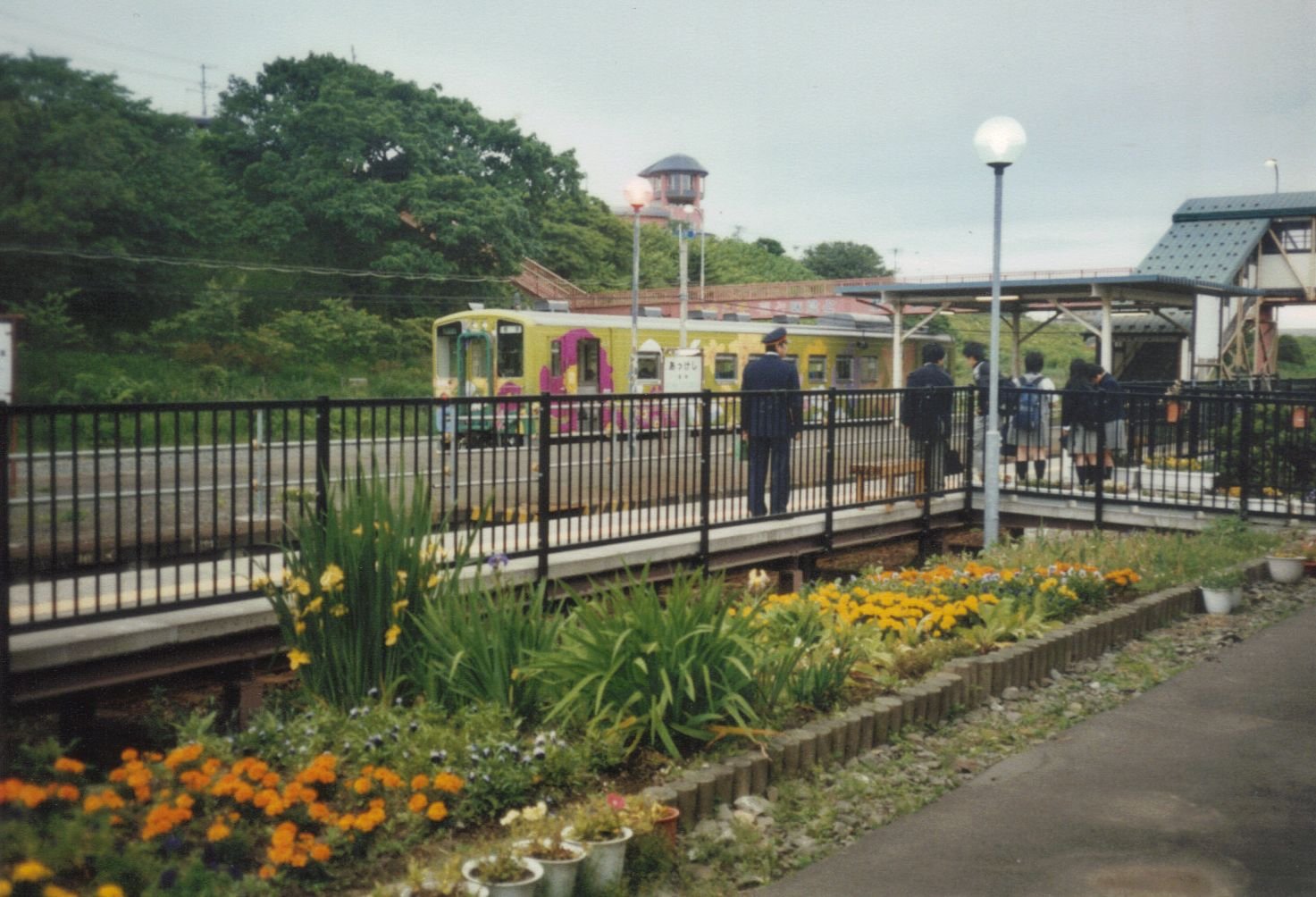
Akkeshi railway station

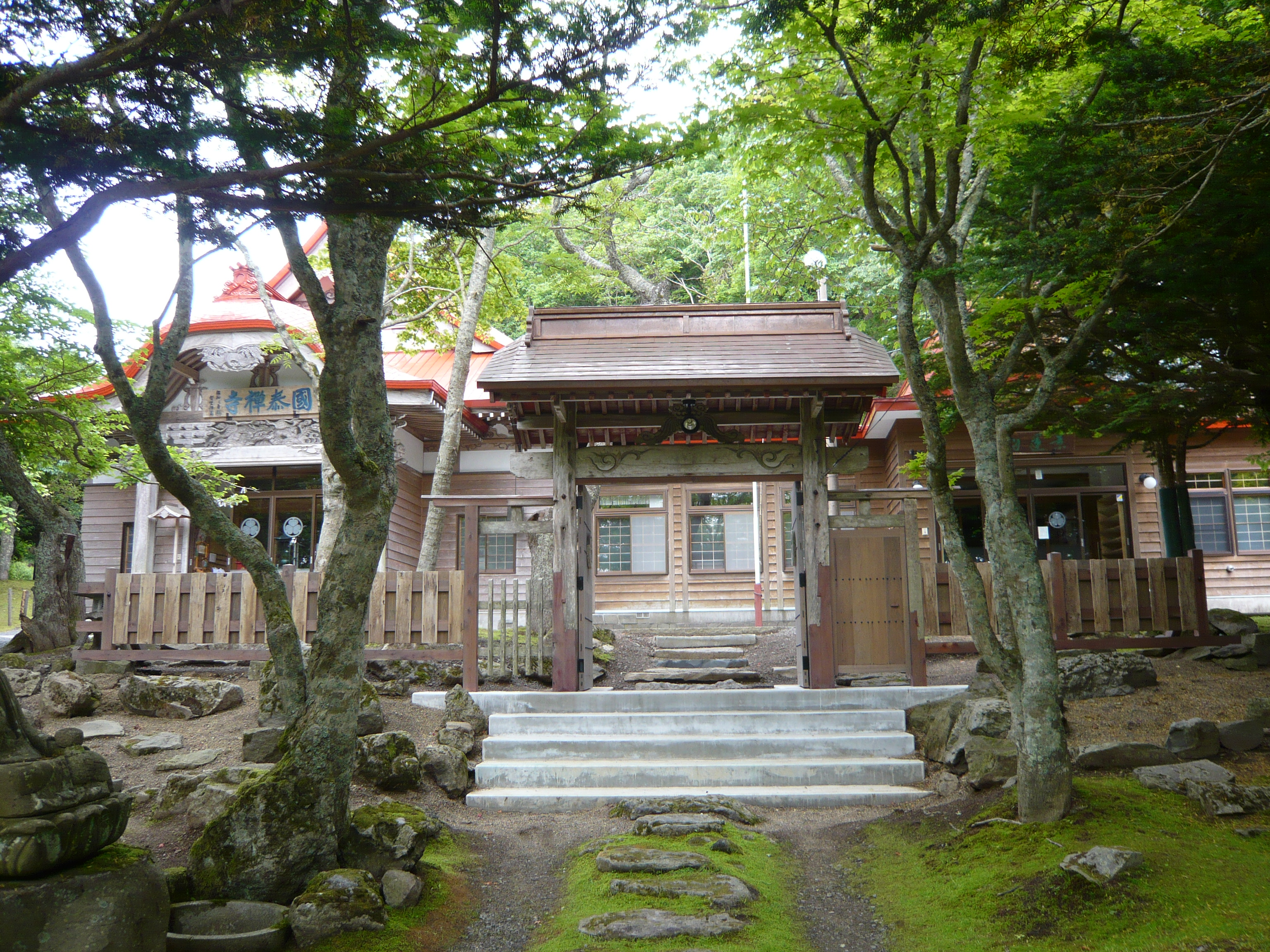
Kokutai-ji

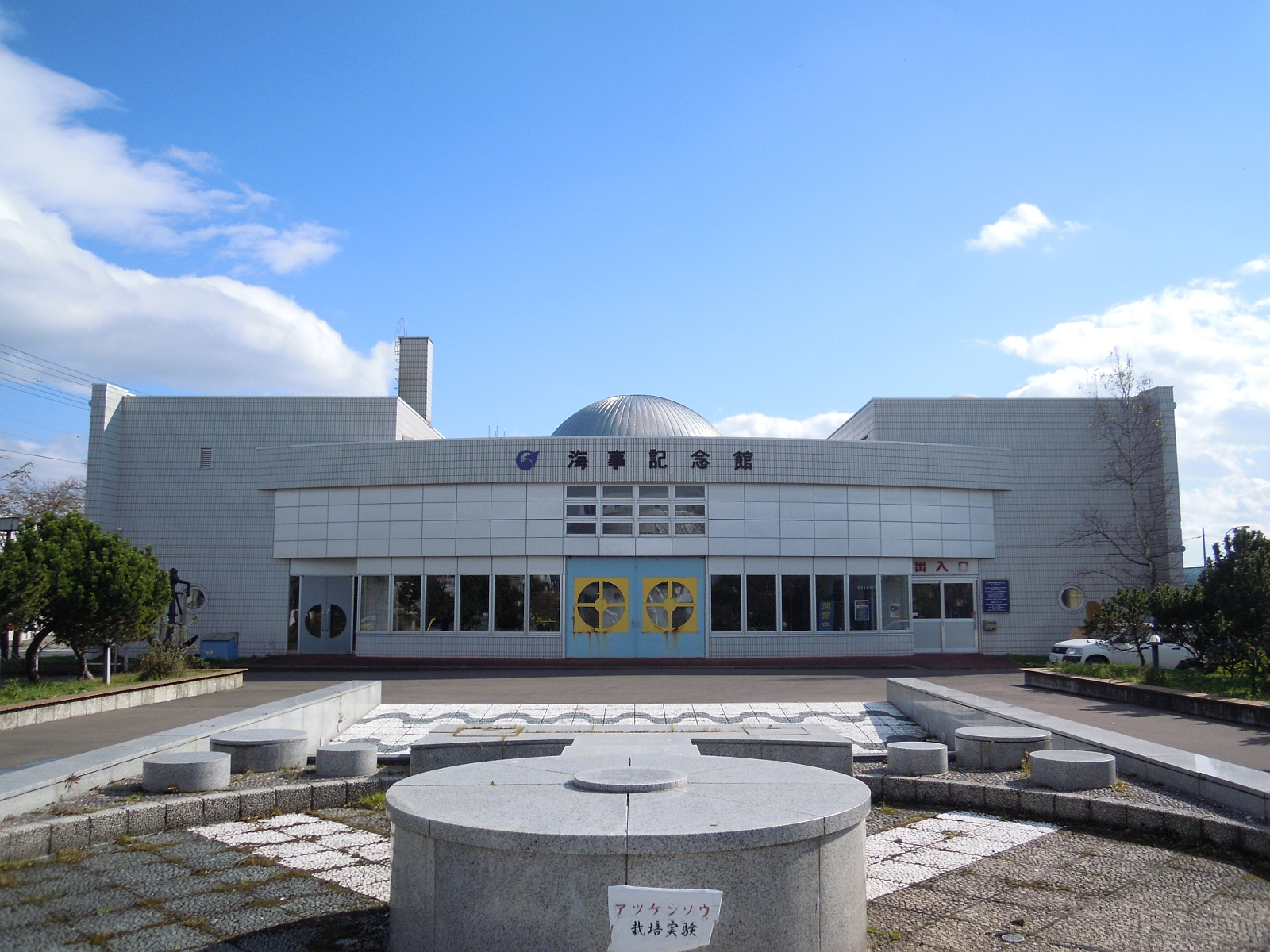
Akkeshi Maritime Museum

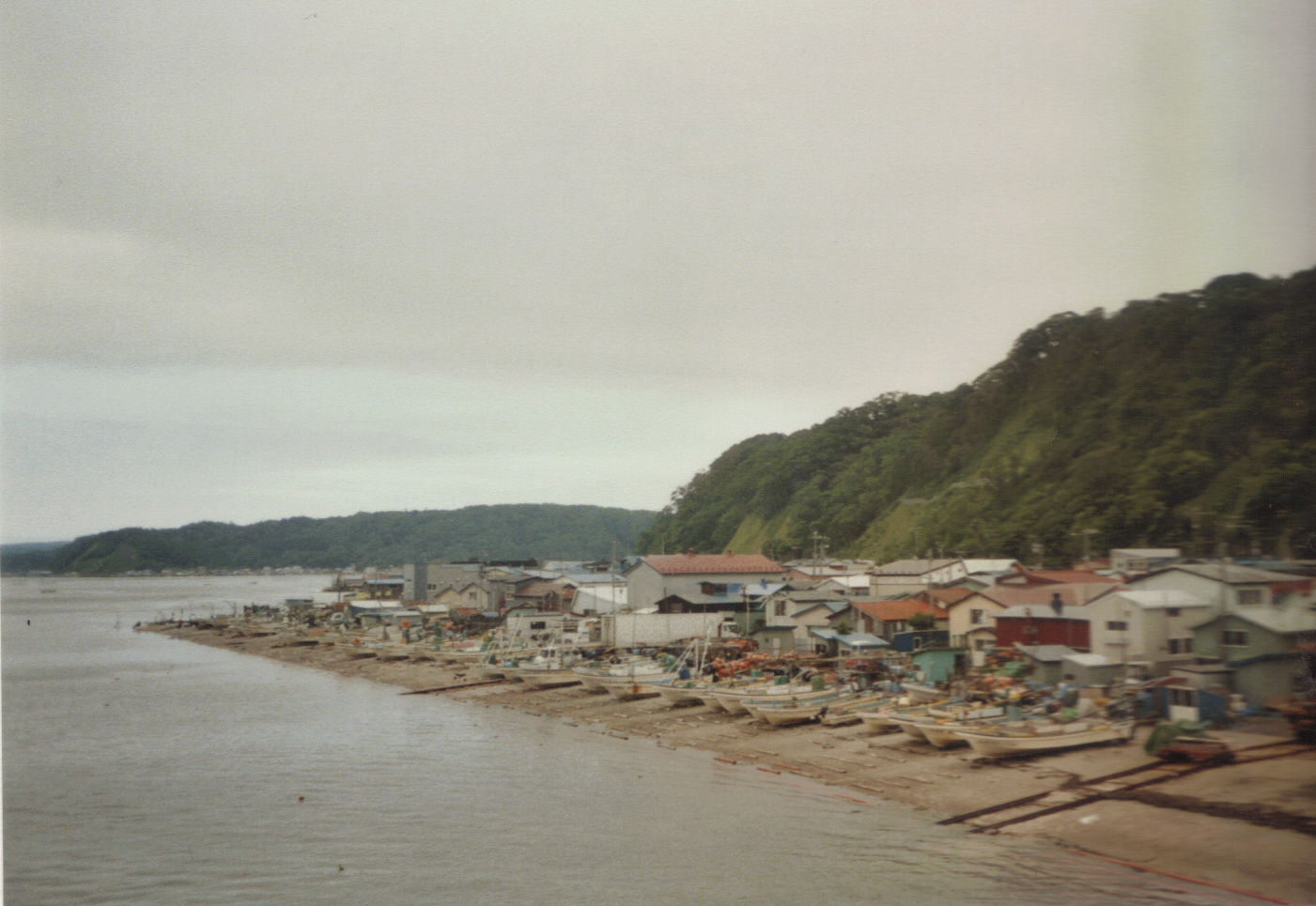
Akkeshi Lagoon

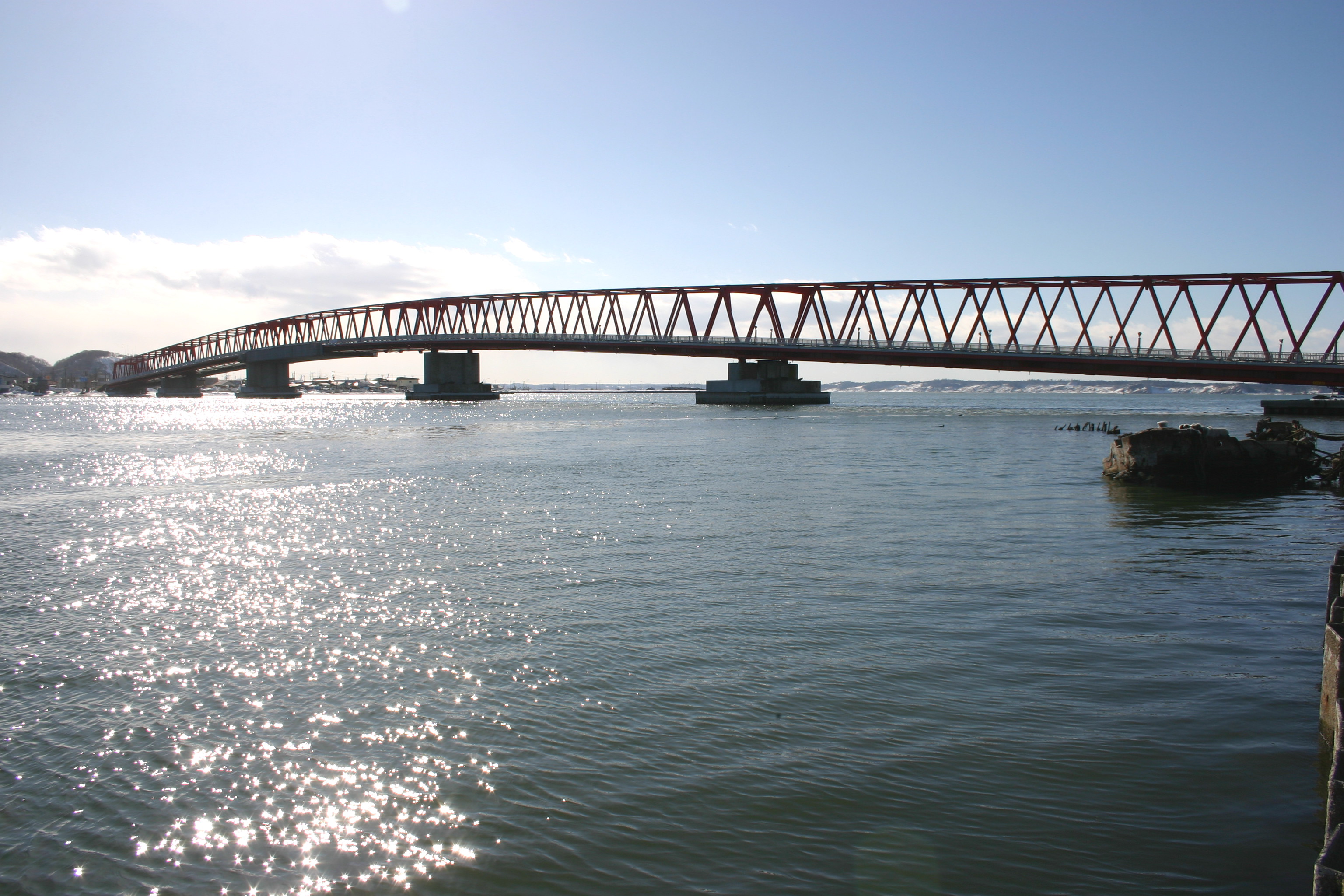
Akkeshi Bridge

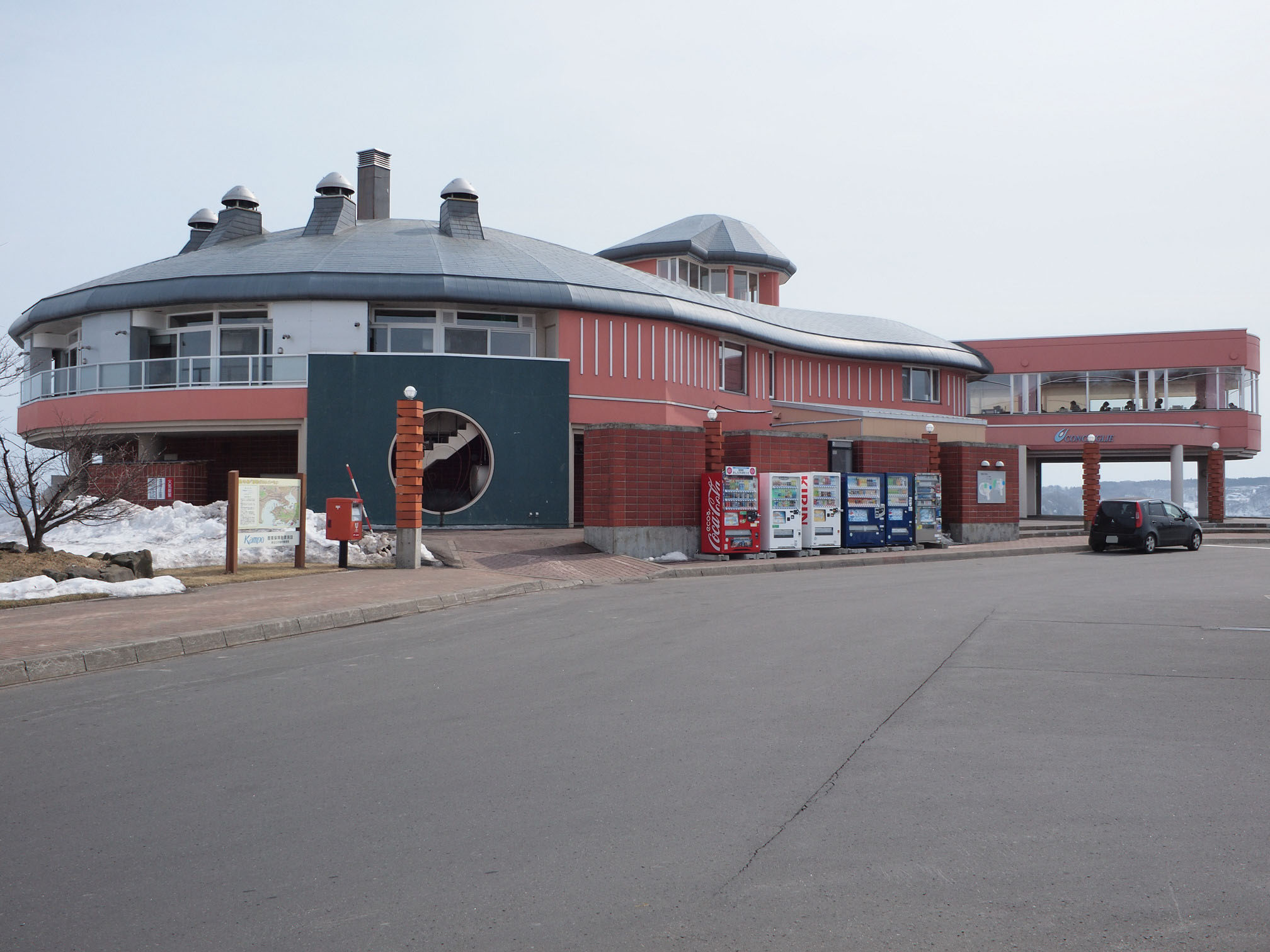
Roadside Station Akkeshi Gourmet Park

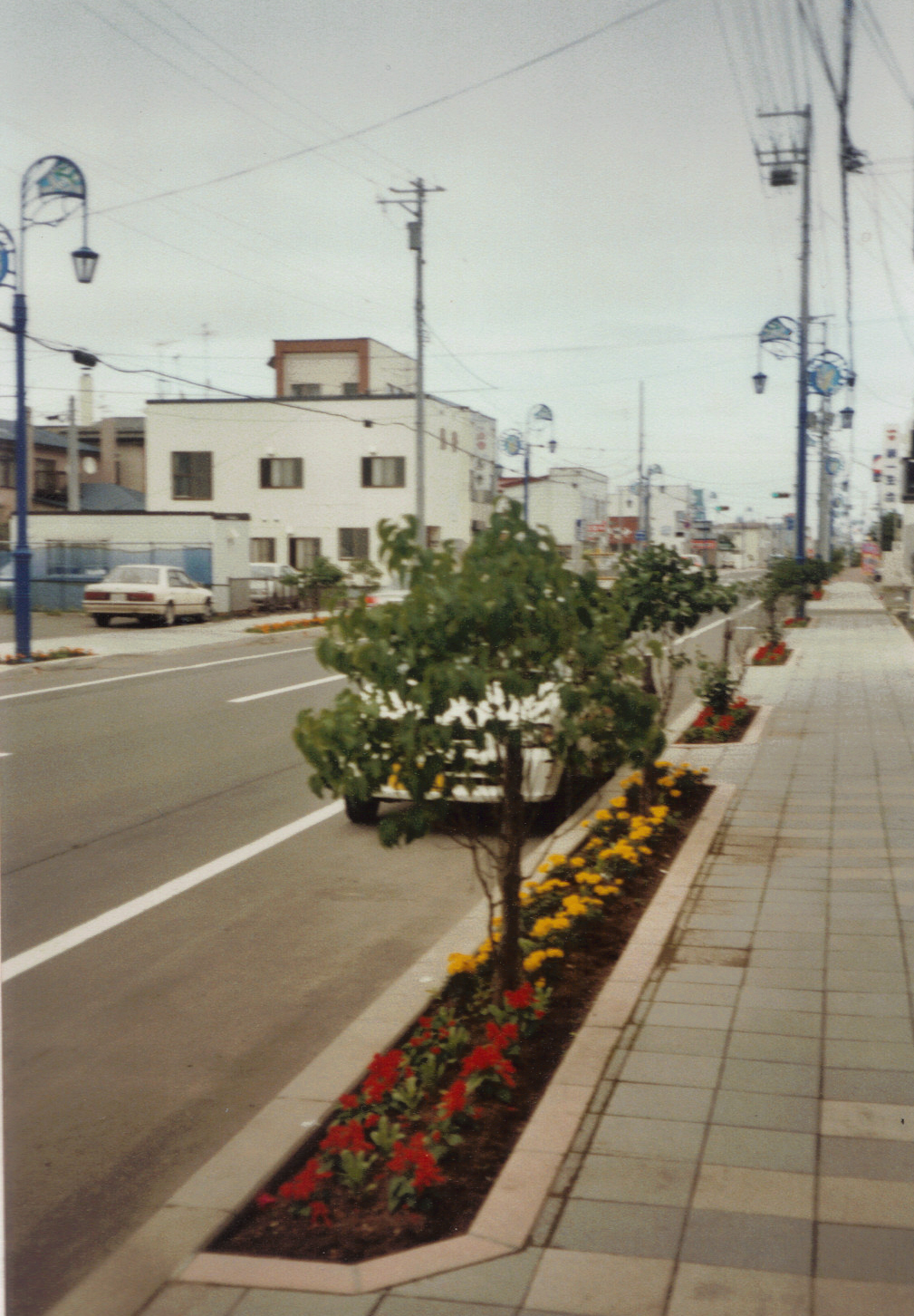
Akkeshi High Street

== Mascot ==
Umiemon, the town's mascot

Akkeshi's mascot is Umiemon (うみえもん). He is a yōkai samurai from the sea. His chonmage is stylized like a sea urchin, his eyebrows resembles kelp, his nose is like the Japanese littleneck clam and his ears are like Sakhalin surf clams. His hakama is armored with scallops. The sode (spaulders) on his hakama resembled oysters. His weapon is the saury (when he wields it, it acts like a katana to give a powerful slap to his adversaries).
