= Tondenhei =

Military settler colonists recruited after the Meiji Restoration

The tondenhei (屯田兵, Soldiers stationed in the fields, literally "field-encampment soldiers") were military settler colonists recruited after the Meiji Restoration to develop and defend Japan's northern frontier in Hokkaidō and Karafuto against foreign states, particularly Imperial Russia. The term tonden comes from ancient China, where colonist militias were also employed to defend imperial frontiers. The first recruits in Japan were former samurai whose feudal lords had opposed the Meiji forces and whose domains were therefore abolished, leaving them without gainful employment. Later recruits included commoners as well as samurai.

== History ==
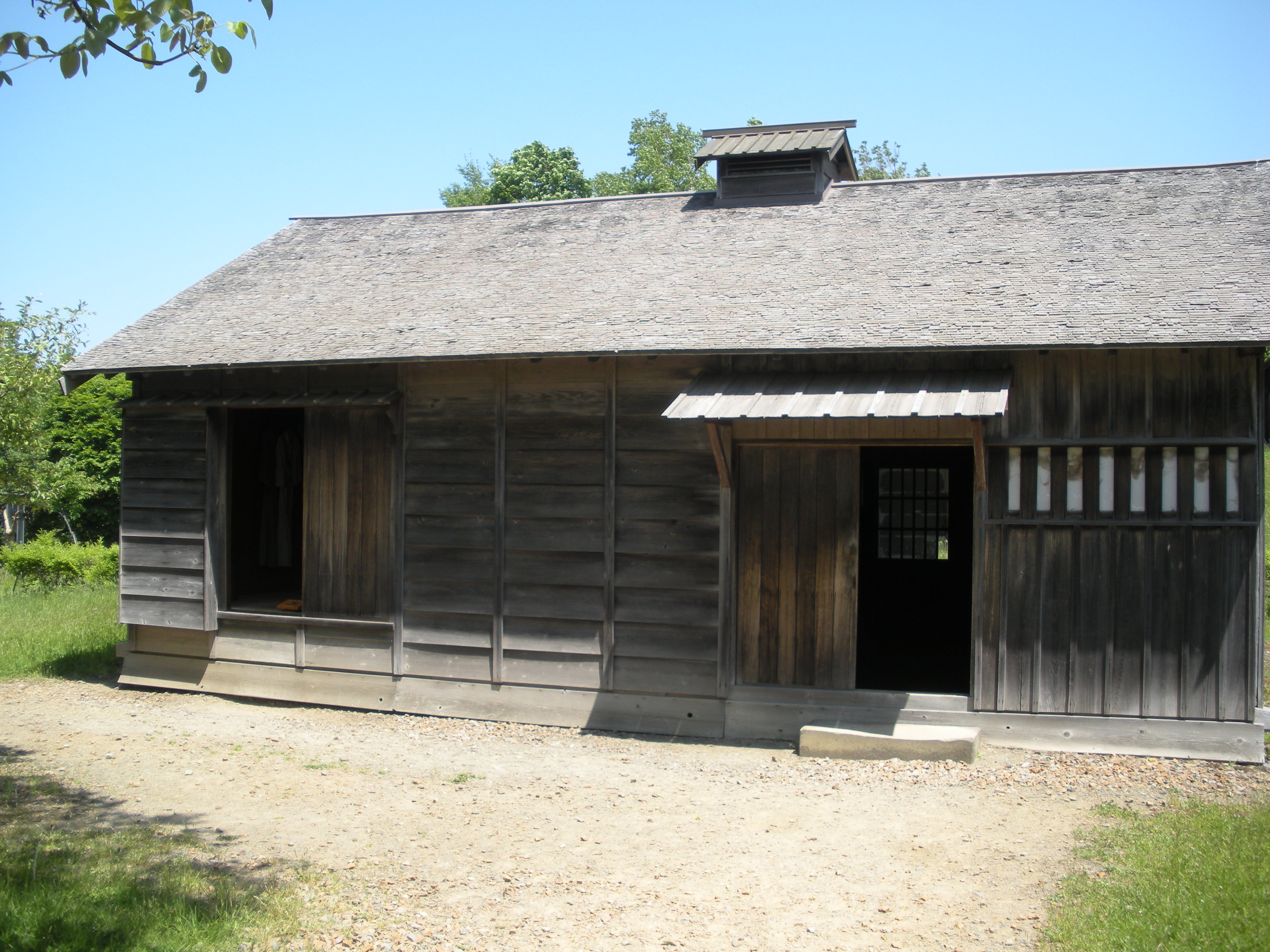
A tondenhei residence in Sapporo

The Tokugawa Shogunate had encouraged Japanese to settle in Hokkaidō, especially after Hakodate became a treaty port open to foreigners under the 1854 Convention of Kanagawa between Japan and the United States. After defeating the Tokugawa, the Meiji government created the Kaitakushi (開拓使) (Colonization Office) for Hokkaidō. The Kaitakushi recruited many foreign advisors (oyatoi gaikokujin) to help modernize the economy and in 1874 began recruiting ex-samurai to populate and defend the northern islands.

In 1875, the first group of almost 200 ex-samurai and their families arrived in Hokkaidō and settled in the Kotoni district of Sapporo. Within two years, more than 2,000 tondenhei families had arrived in Hokkaidō. Tondenhei villages usually held between 150 and 220 families. Most of the villages were on the western side of the island, in the Ishikari River valley near Sapporo and Takikawa, and in the fertile Kamikawa Basin upstream from Asahikawa. But there were also military colonies near strategic ports in the south and east, such as Muroran, Akkeshi, and Nemuro. In all, over 7,000 tondenhei families helped found about 40 villages on the island.

The government furnished each soldier with a cold-weather uniform and each household with eight acres of land and a house with a Russian stove in it. All male settlers between 18 and 35 were assigned to regiments. As ex-samurai, they often had swords in addition to their military-issue firearms. They would farm during the summers and perform most of their military duties during the winter. Many samurai were unused to farming, especially raising such northern crops as beans and potatoes, but families worked together to adapt to the harsh climate.

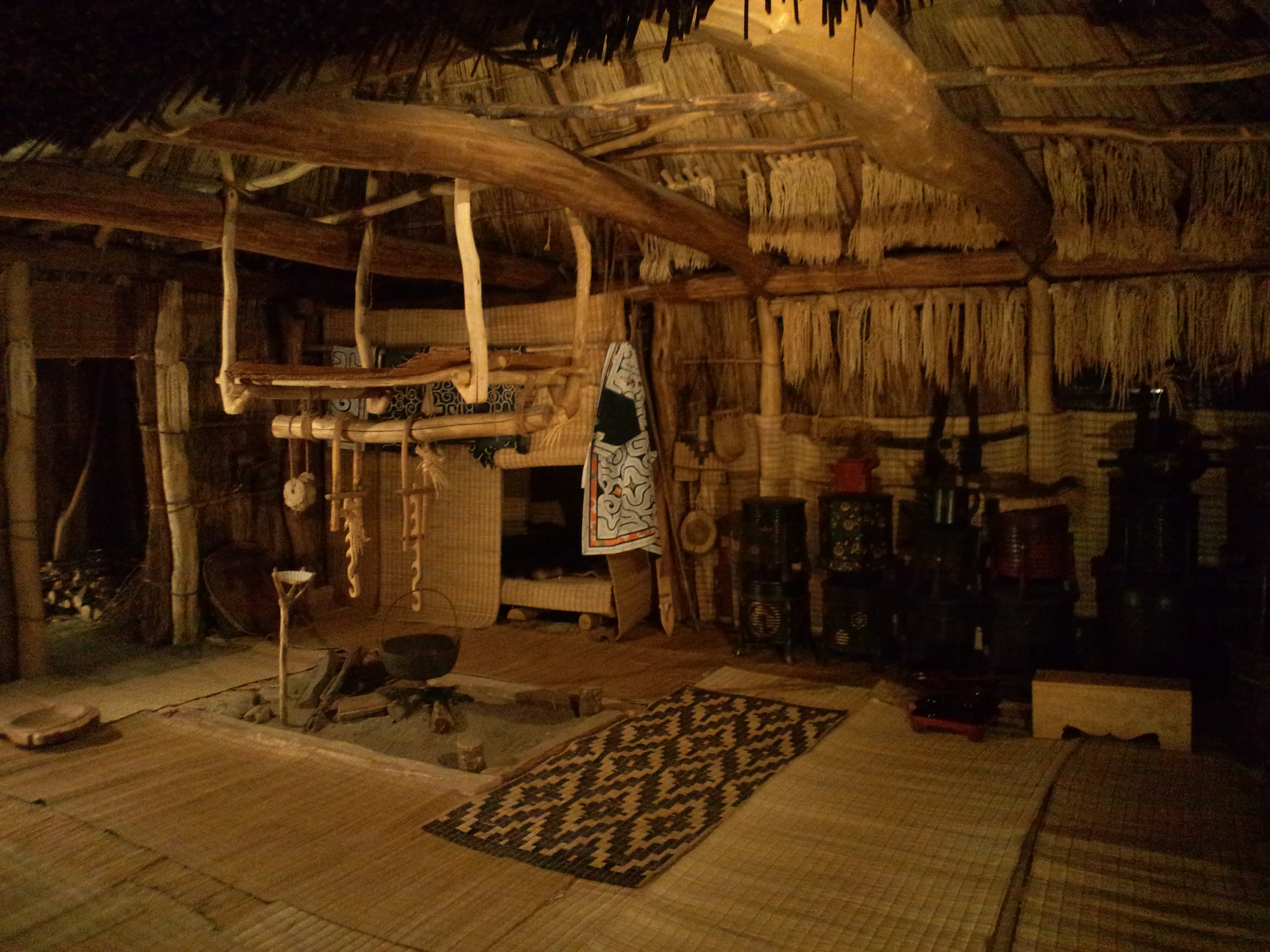
Reconstruction Ainu house

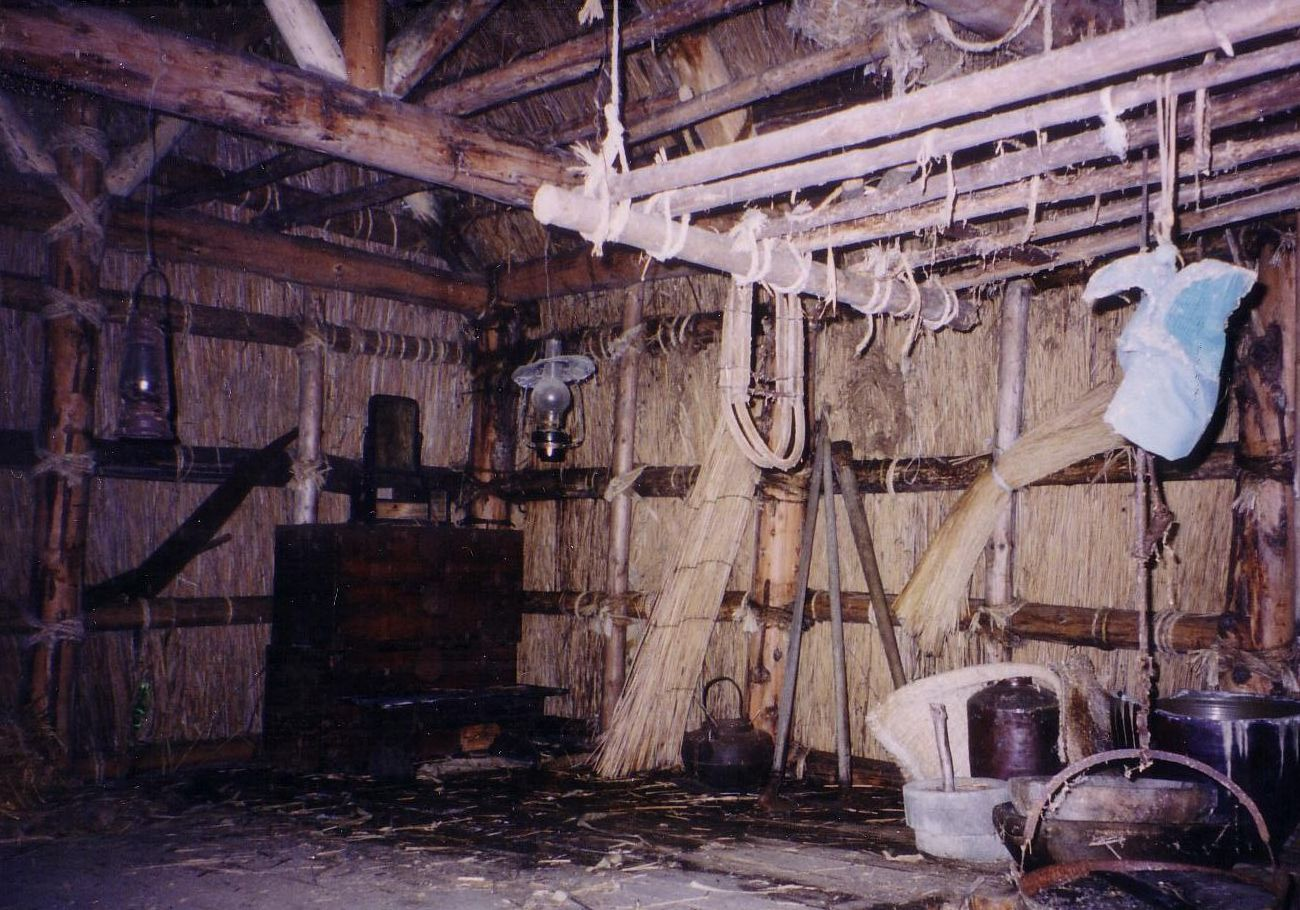
Reconstruction settler's house, 1915

After the Kaitakushi was abolished in 1882, the Imperial Japanese Army assumed control of the units. In 1903 they incorporated them into the famous 7th Division ("Bear Division"), which distinguished itself in the Russo-Japanese War, in Nomonhan at the China–Mongolia border, and in the Guadalcanal Campaign.

== Cultural references ==
In the manga Rurouni Kenshin, a minor villain named Fuji cuts a deal with the Meiji government and agrees to become a tondenhei instead of facing trial.

== See also ==
- Kondei
- Shōgitai, source of a number of early tondenhei
- Wehrbauer, similar concept in Central Europe
- List of obsolete occupations
