= Mount Apoi Geopark =

Geopark in the country of Japan

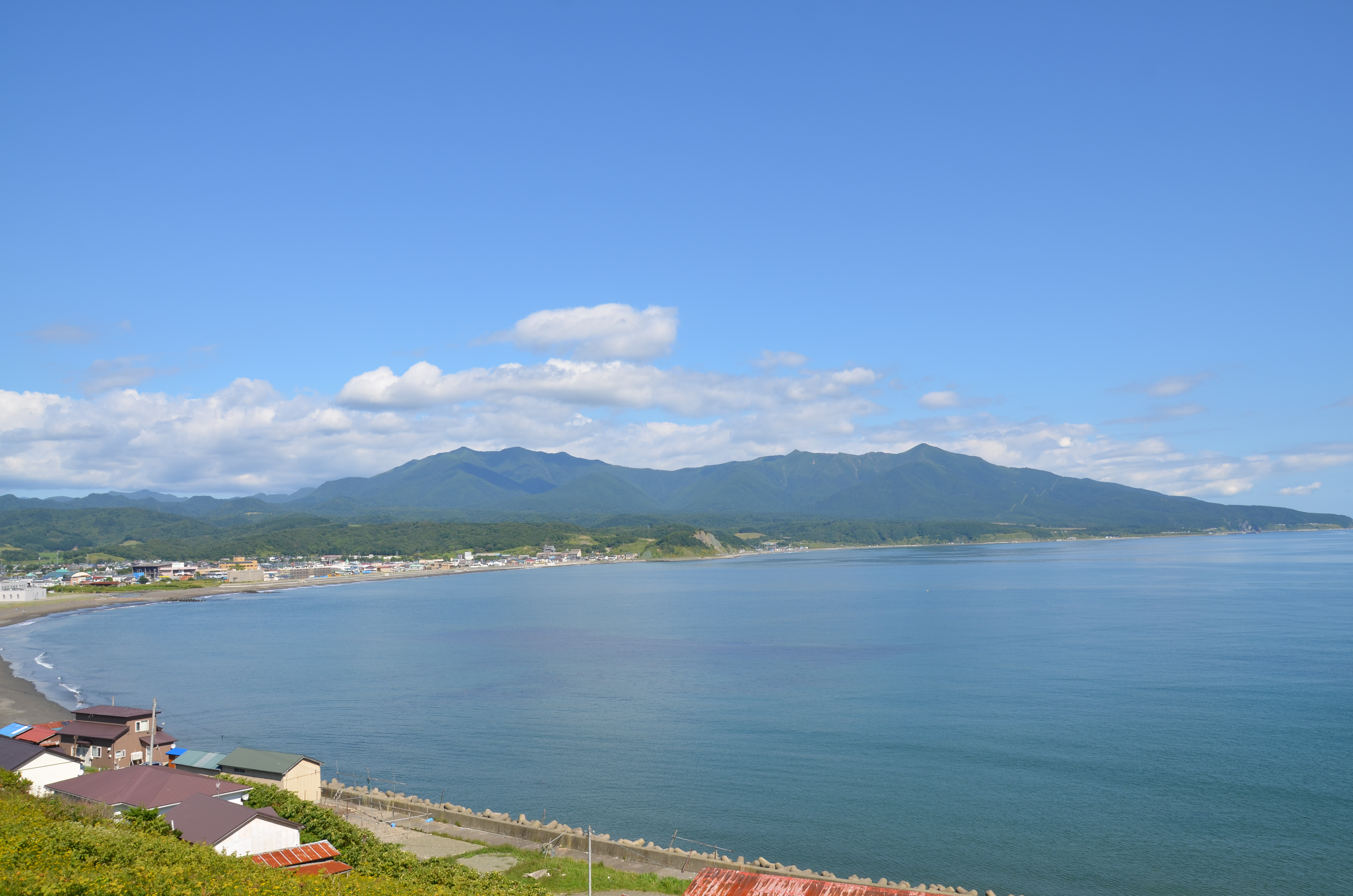
- View of Mount Apoi from Cape Enrumu
- Interactive map of Mount Apoi Geopark
- Type: UNESCO Global Geoparks
- Location: Mount Apoi, Hokkaidō, Japan
- Nearest city: Samani
- Coordinates: 42°6′28″N 143°1′32″E
- Created: 19 September 2015
- Website: https://www.apoi-geopark.jp/english/

The Mount Apoi Geopark (アポイ岳ジオパーク) is a geopark covering the whole territory of Samani in Japan's northern island of Hokkaidō. The area was declared a Japanese Geopark in 2008, and a UNESCO Global Geopark in 2015.

== Geology ==
Mount Apoi is part of the Hidaka Mountains, a mountain range in southeastern Hokkaidō which was formed from a collision between two continental plates 13 million years ago. The relatively fresh peridotites on and around Mt. Apoi offer a rare visible glimpse of the Earth's mantle, thrust up from the depths of the earth by global-scale dynamic ground movement.

== Vegetation ==
Mt. Apoi provides habitats for alpine vegetation due to its unique soil, weather and geographical conditions. It is home to Hidakaso (Callianthemum miyabeanum) and a host of other endemic species. The area's alpine plant communities have been collectively designated as a Special Natural Monument of Japan.
