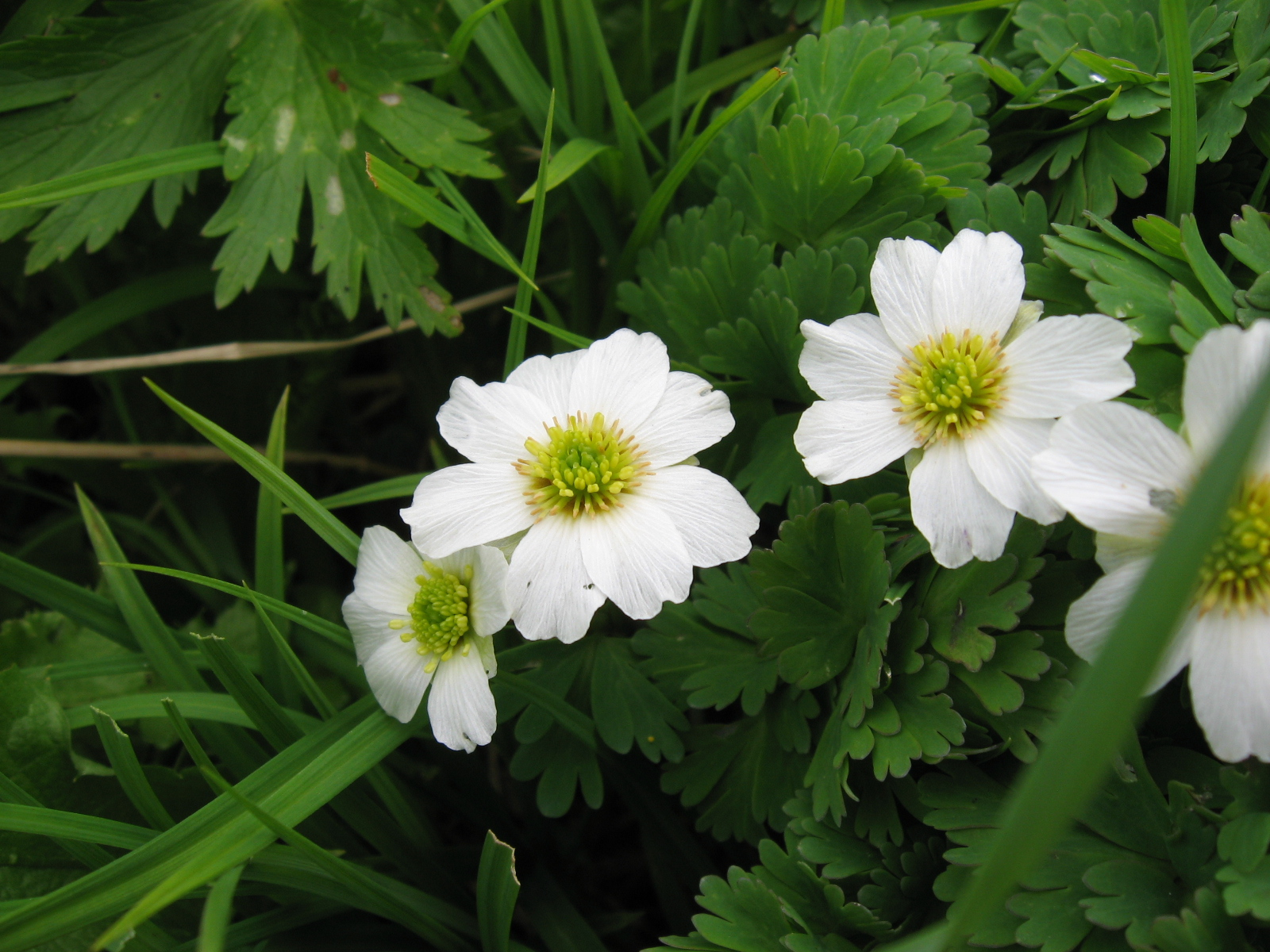
- Callianthemum hondoense

Scientific classification
- Kingdom: Plantae
- Clade: Tracheophytes
- Clade: Angiosperms
- Clade: Eudicots
- Order: Ranunculales
- Family: Ranunculaceae
- Subfamily: Ranunculoideae
- Tribe: Callianthemeae; Wei Wang & Z.D.Chen
- Genus: Callianthemum; C.A.Mey.

Species
- See text

= Callianthemum =

Genus of flowering plants

Callianthemum is a genus that consists of 24 species of little rhizomatous herbs from high mountains in Europe, Central Asia and East Asia. The botanical name comes from the Greek, which means beautiful flower. The plants are low-growing, ornamental perennials. Leaves are small and radical. Flowers are showy daisy-like, 1.5in in diameter, with 5-15 white or rose-color petals and nectaries at the base. Blooming in spring.

== Species ==
Callianthemum acaule
Callianthemum alatavicum
Callianthemum anemonoides
Callianthemum angustifolium
Callianthemum berardi
Callianthemum bipinnatum
Callianthemum cachemirianum
Callianthemum cashmirianum
Callianthemum coriandrifolium
Callianthemum endlicheri
Callianthemum farreri
Callianthemum hondoense
Callianthemum insigne
Callianthemum isopyroides
Callianthemum kernerianum
Callianthemum miyabeanum
Callianthemum pimpinelloides
Callianthemum sachalinense
Callianthemum sajanense
Callianthemum semiverticillatum
Callianthemum taipaicum
Callianthemum tibeticum
