= Mount Apoi =

Mountain in the country of Japan

- アポイ岳
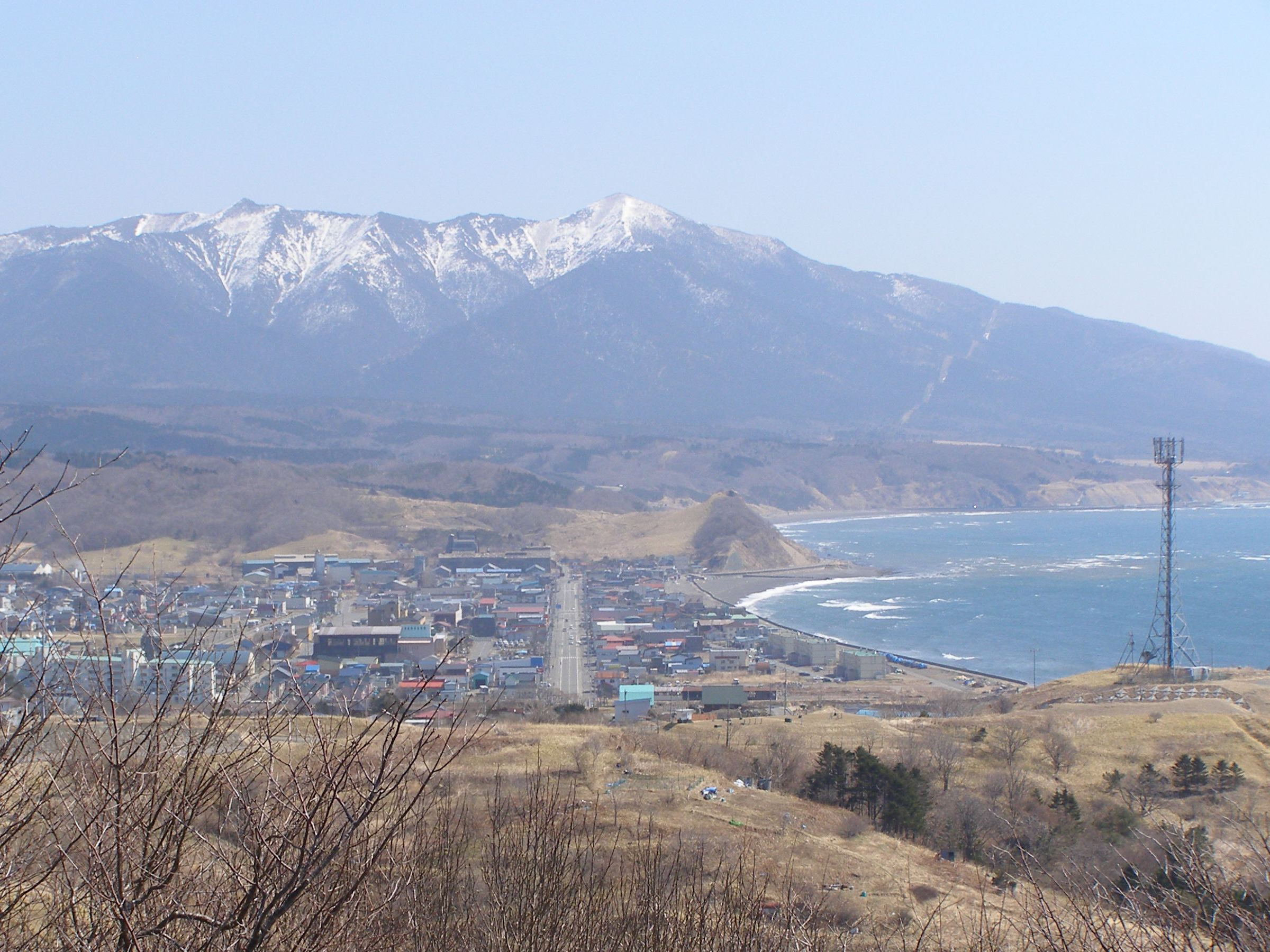
- A view of Mount Apoi with Samani Town in the foreground.

Highest point
- Elevation: 810.2 m (2,658 ft)
- Prominence: 130 m (430 ft)
- Parent peak: Pinneshiri (Hidaka)
- Listing: List of mountains and hills of Japan by height
- Coordinates: 42°6′28″N 143°1′32″E

Geography
- Location within Japan
- Location: Hokkaidō, Japan
- Parent range: Hidaka Mountains
- Topo map(s): Geospatial Information Authority of Japan (国土地理院, Kokudochiriin) 25000:1 アポイ岳, 50000:1 えりも

Geology
- Mountain type: Fold

Climbing
- Easiest route: Hike

Mount Apoi (アポイ岳, Apoi-dake) is located in the Hidaka Mountains, Hokkaidō, Japan. It is near the town of Samani. It is well known for hosting a large number of plants that are found only on Hokkaidō, such as Callianthemum miyabeanum (ヒダカソウ, Hidaka-sō). The mountain is made from ultramafic rock of unknown age.

== Mt. Apoi Geopark ==
Mount Apoi Geopark is a geopark covering whole territory of Samani. Mt. Apoi Geopark is a geological area where visitors can learn about and enjoy the valuable geological heritage and the rich natural environment as well as the history and culture of Samani. The area is home to mountains and gorges made of peridotites featuring purity and variety found in few places worldwide as well as endemic alpine plant communities that thrive in the area's particular soil. The town also has a long history and a rich culture based on its development as a trading hub thanks to the favorable natural harbor created by its unusual coastal terrain.

The Mt. Apoi Geopark was certified as a Japanese Geopark in 2008, and a UNESCO Global Geopark in 2015.

== Flora of Mt. Apoi ==
Mt. Apoi and the surrounding area consist of a mixed forest of needle-leaved and broad-leaved trees, with a mixture of cool-temperate northern Japanese spruce and subalpine Ezo spruce. The distribution of alpine plants and Ezo spruce descends to lower elevations than what one would typically see. Mt. Apoi is a hotspot for biodiversity. About 80 species of alpine plants grow on Mt. Apoi despite its low elevation (810 m), and there are nearly 20 endemic species, including subspecies, varieties, and varieties. The reasons for this include:

- The soil made from peridotite on Mt. Apoi contains high levels of nickel, magnesium, and other elements that inhibit plant growth, and the peridotite takes a long time to erode, therefore it takes time to become soil. The soil is thin, dry, and nutrient-poor because it is easily moved by wind and rain, preventing the establishment of coniferous trees.
- The environment is similar to that of higher mountains due to the local weather conditions. The area receives low snowfall and is exposed to strong winds, which can easily cause freezing and thawing of the soil damaging plant roots and destabilizing the soil on sloping areas. The low temperatures during summer are due to the thick fog that comes from the nearby Pacific Ocean.
- In addition, northern plants that migrated south from the Asian continents during the glacial period escaped to the high mountains and Mt. Apoi during the warm interglacial period. The plants that remained on Mt. Apoi were isolated and evolved in their own way as they adapted to the characteristic peridotite soil.

== Fauna of Mt. Apoi ==
- Ezo Japanese Pika
  - The Ezo Japanese Pika, a famous variety of pika, is a relic from the ice age. It grows to a size of 15 cm, is dark brown in color with rounded ears and lets out a sharp, alarming cry. Even though the Ezo Japanese Pika lives in central Hokkaido within the alpine zone of the Hidaka mountains, their distribution in Southern Hidaka is universally limited to the southern area. It is also found at very low altitudes, 50 meters above sea level, around the rocky terrain of Mt. Apoi and the Horoman River.
- Himechamadara Seseri
  - The Himechamadara Seseri (Seseri species) is a butterfly that grows to a length of about 2.5 cm, and is brown in color with small white speckles. This butterfly lives exclusively at Mt. Apoi and exists nowhere else in Japan. The larva eats the Kinrobai alpine flower and matures into an adult during May and June. This one-month span is the only time it can be seen. It is believed that the Himechamadara Seseri was widely distributed during the Ice Age but was left here at Mt. Apoi as the climate warmed.
- Apoi Maimai
  - The Apoi Maimai is an endemic species of snail (recorded as a new species in 1970) that exists around Mt. Apoi and near the Horoman River. Related to the Takahide Maimai of the Hime Maimai genus that exists in Hokkaido, the Apoi Maimai can be found in the crevices around the peridotite rock. The shell of the Apoi Maimai only grows to a size of 1 cm wide, is dark brown in color, and sprouts thin stiff hairs on the surface of the shell.

== See also ==
- List of Special Places of Scenic Beauty, Special Historic Sites and Special Natural Monuments
- Mt. Apoi Geopark (in English)
