= Hidaka-horobetsu Station =

Railway station in Urakawa, Hokkaido, Japan

Coordinates: 42.1425°N 142.8347°E

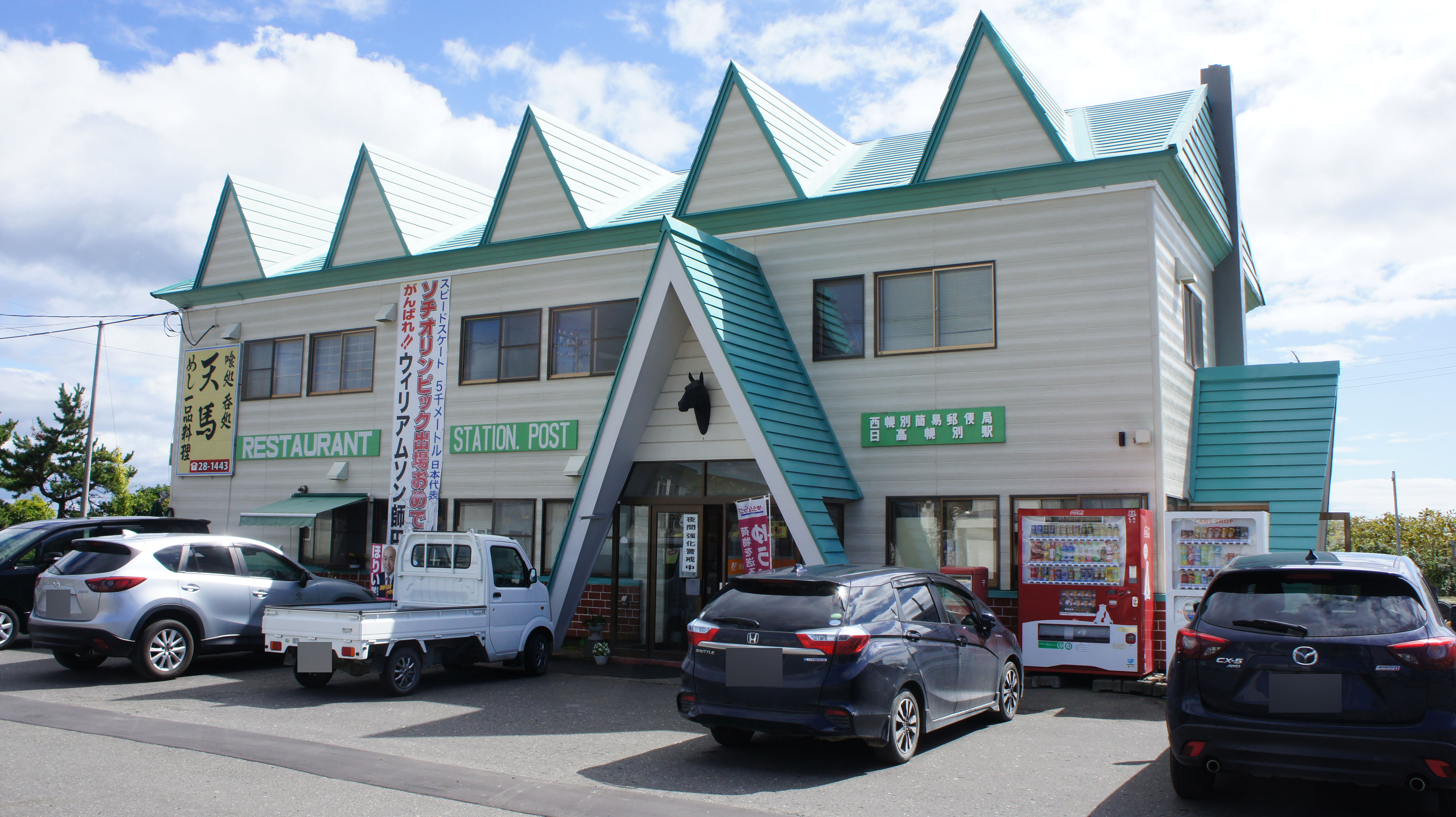
The station in 2017

Hidaka-Horobetsu Station (日高幌別駅, Hidaka-Horobetsu-eki) was a railway station on the Hidaka Main Line in Urakawa, Hokkaido, Japan, operated by the Hokkaido Railway Company (JR Hokkaido). The station opened on 10 August 1937.

Services on the 116 km section of the line between Mukawa and Samani have been suspended indefinitely since January 2015 due to storm damage.

== Lines ==
- Hidaka Main Line

== Adjacent stations ==
«	Service	»
Hidaka Main Line
Higashichō	Local	Utoma

== History ==
The station opened on 10 August 1937. With the privatization of Japanese National Railways (JNR) on 1 April 1987, the station came under the control of JR Hokkaido.

== See also ==
- List of railway stations in Japan
