= Erimo, Hokkaido =

Erimo えりも町 Erimo-chō
- Town
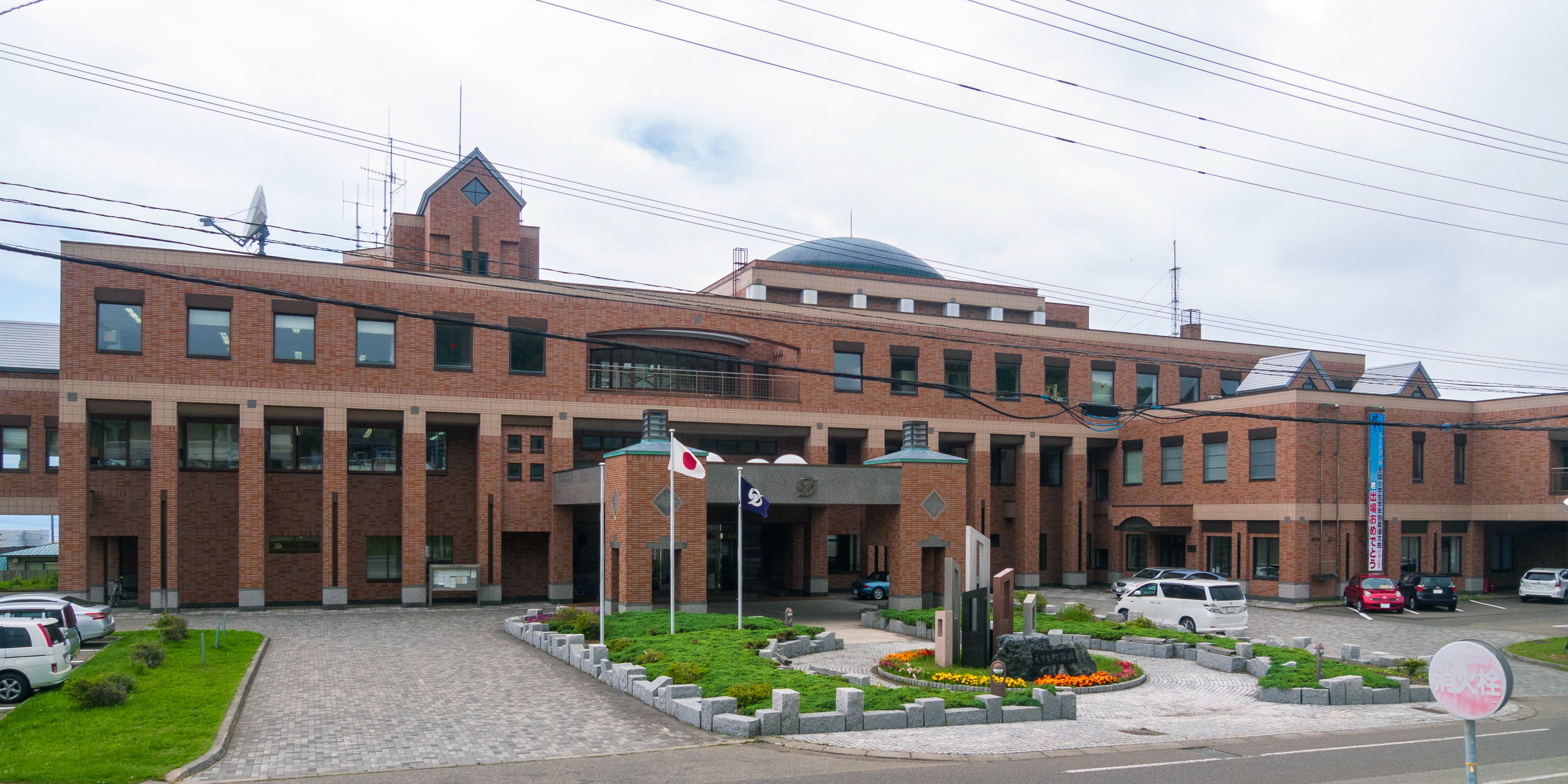
- Erimo Town Hall

- Flag Emblem

- Location of Erimo in Hokkaido (Hidaka Subprefecture)
- Interactive map of Erimo
- Coordinates: 42°00′59″N 143°08′54″E
- Country: Japan
- Region: Hokkaido
- Prefecture: Hokkaido (Hidaka Subprefecture)
- District: Horoizumi

Area
  - Total: 284.00 km^{2} (109.65 sq mi)

Population (1 January 2026)
  - Total: 3,937
  - Density: 13.86/km^{2} (35.90/sq mi)
- Time zone: UTC+09:00 (JST)
- City hall address: 206 Jihon-chō, Erimo-chō, Horoizumi-gun, Hokkaidō 058-0292
- Climate: Cfb
- Website: www.town.erimo.lg.jp
- Symbols
- Flower: Rhododendron kaempferi (エゾヤマツツジ, Ezo-yama-tsutsuji)
- Mascot: Windy-kun (ウインディーくん, Uindī-kun)
- Tree: Rhododendron fauriei (エリモシャクナゲ, Erimo-shakunage)

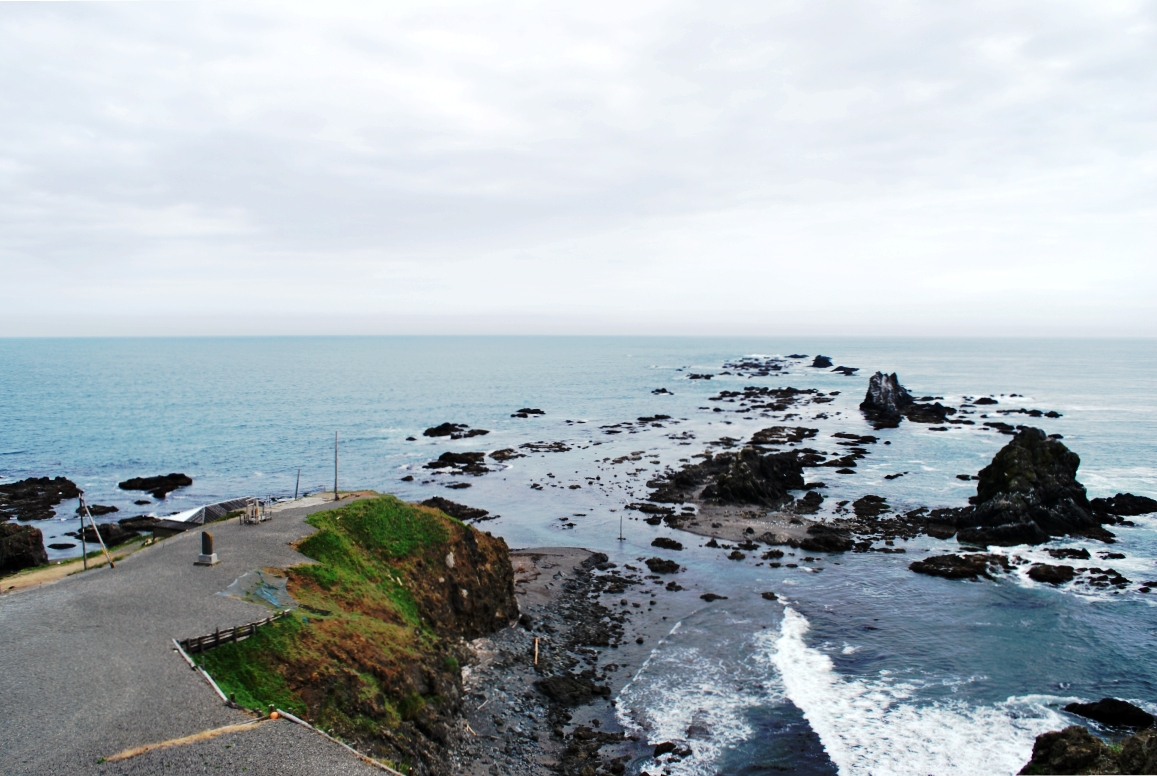
Cape Erimo

Erimo (えりも町, Erimo-chō) is a town located in Hidaka Subprefecture, Hokkaidō, Japan. As of 1 January 2026, the town had an estimated population of 3,937 in 1947 households, and a population density of 14 people per km^{2}. The total area of the town is 284.00 km^{2} (109.65 sq mi).

== Geography ==
Erimo is located in southern Hokkaido, in the central coastal area of the Hidaka Subprefecture. It is situated at the southern end of the Hidaka Mountains, and contains Cape Erimo. The town's coastline stretches approximately 53.8 km. The areas surrounding the Hidaka Mountains, Lake Toyoni, and the coastal area extending from Cape Erimo and its surrounding areas to Hiroo Town are within the borders of the Hidakasanmyaku-Erimo-Tokachi National Park. Mount Toyoni (1105 meters) is the highest point in the town.

=== Neighboring municipalities ===
- Hiroo
- Samani

=== Climate ===
Due to the frequent occurrence of dense fog (sea fog) in spring and summer, the average maximum temperature in August (the warmest month) is 19.9 °C, the lowest in Japan (excluding the summit of Mount Fuji) according to the AMeDAS (Automated Meteorological Agency) meteorological station. Furthermore, the highest temperature ever recorded was 28.5 °C (27 August 2023), and even summer days are rarely observed, making this area one of the coldest regions in Hokkaido. On the other hand, unusually for Hokkaido, there are many years in which temperatures never drop below -10 °C, making this an area with a small annual range. Because of these cool summers and relatively mild winters, the Köppen climate classification places the area in a oceanic climate (Cfb) region. It is also a very windy region, with the windiest spot at Cape Erimo experiencing wind speeds of 10 m/s or more on average 269 days per year.

Climate data for Cape Erimo, 1991–2020 normals, extremes 1978–present
Month	Jan	Feb	Mar	Apr	May	Jun	Jul	Aug	Sep	Oct	Nov	Dec	Year
Record high °C (°F)	10.1 (50.2)	7.0 (44.6)	11.8 (53.2)	14.4 (57.9)	19.3 (66.7)	22.3 (72.1)	25.9 (78.6)	28.5 (83.3)	26.2 (79.2)	23.3 (73.9)	18.2 (64.8)	13.6 (56.5)	28.5 (83.3)
Mean daily maximum °C (°F)	0.2 (32.4)	−0.2 (31.6)	2.2 (36.0)	6.1 (43.0)	10.1 (50.2)	13.6 (56.5)	17.5 (63.5)	19.9 (67.8)	19.0 (66.2)	14.7 (58.5)	9.3 (48.7)	3.3 (37.9)	9.6 (49.4)
Daily mean °C (°F)	−1.8 (28.8)	−2.2 (28.0)	0.1 (32.2)	3.4 (38.1)	7.2 (45.0)	11.1 (52.0)	15.2 (59.4)	17.7 (63.9)	16.9 (62.4)	12.5 (54.5)	6.8 (44.2)	1.0 (33.8)	7.3 (45.2)
Mean daily minimum °C (°F)	−4.0 (24.8)	−4.3 (24.3)	−1.9 (28.6)	1.3 (34.3)	5.0 (41.0)	9.0 (48.2)	13.4 (56.1)	15.8 (60.4)	14.9 (58.8)	10.2 (50.4)	4.2 (39.6)	−1.3 (29.7)	5.2 (41.4)
Record low °C (°F)	−11.5 (11.3)	−12.1 (10.2)	−10.2 (13.6)	−4.8 (23.4)	−0.5 (31.1)	3.4 (38.1)	6.0 (42.8)	10.5 (50.9)	7.6 (45.7)	2.3 (36.1)	−5.1 (22.8)	−11.0 (12.2)	−12.1 (10.2)
Average precipitation mm (inches)	24.3 (0.96)	16.6 (0.65)	35.9 (1.41)	67.8 (2.67)	99.5 (3.92)	85.9 (3.38)	128.8 (5.07)	129.2 (5.09)	137.8 (5.43)	117.0 (4.61)	85.6 (3.37)	48.7 (1.92)	977.1 (38.48)
Average precipitation days (≥ 1.0 mm)	5.8	5.0	6.7	8.4	10.0	8.3	10.6	10.4	10.2	11.0	12.2	9.0	107.6
Mean monthly sunshine hours	159.5	175.9	208.1	196.9	183.6	139.3	123.0	127.8	161.4	179.6	135.2	135.1	1,926.2
Source 1: JMA
Source 2: JMA

== Demographics ==
Per Japanese census data, the population of Erimo has declined in recent decades.

Historical population
Year	Pop.	±%
1970	7,725	—
1980	7,520	−2.7%
1990	7,034	−6.5%
2000	6,248	−11.2%
2010	5,415	−13.3%
2020	4,374	−19.2%

== History ==
=== Premodern Period ===
The Ainu of Horoizumi were firstly recorded in documents in 1515 (Eisho 12) during the Muromachi period, during the Shono Koushi Rebellion. The settlements in the area were at the time known with the name "Horoizumi" (like its nearby town). In 1669 the Edo period, Matsumae Domain samurai, Kakizaki Kurodo, established a trading post here. This business soon prospered and as a kelp fishing ground, expanding its influence.

=== Meiji and Taisho Periods ===
In 1880, the headman's office was established. causing the creation of a local administrative area. In 1889, Cape Erimo Lighthouse was completed. In the year 1906, the headman's office was abolished under the second-class town and village system and the village of Horoizumi was created. In 1920, the first census was held, counting up to 4,699 people and 863 households. In 1924, the road between Horoizumi and Samani opened, the very first cars started to pass through the town.

=== Showa Period ===
The village started to expand, especially following the inauguration of the Nissho Coast Road "Golden Road" in 1934 and also the fact that the Railway Ministry buses started to operate between Samani, Horoizumi and Shono, involving the village with other municipalities trade and communication routes. This urban, transportation and trading expansion led to the village's demographic growth as a census held in 1955, signaled that there were up to 9,267 people, 1,630 households in the village. On 1 January 1959, 'Horoizumi was promoted to a town, and on 1 October 1970, it was renamed Erimo.

In 1960, Fishing boats suffer extensive damage after Chilean earthquake tsunami hits early in the morning.

The shopping district modernization project and national highway widening project were only truly finished in 1987.

=== Heisei Period ===
In 2006 Emperor Akihito and Empress Michiko visited the town, signaling the first Imperial visit of the area in all of its history.

== Government ==
Erimo has a mayor-council form of government with a directly elected mayor and a unicameral town council of 11 members. Erimo, as part of Hidaka Subprefecture, contributes two members to the Hokkaidō Prefectural Assembly. In terms of national politics, the town is part of the Hokkaidō 9th district of the lower house of the Diet of Japan.

== Economy ==
While the main industry is commercial fishing (salmon, squid and sea urchin in particular), Erimo's most famous harvest is kelp which is harvested by most of the native residents during the summer months. The kelp is sold in Japan as Hidaka konbu, and Erimo has a museum in the main part of town dedicated to kelp and fishery.

== Education ==
Erimo has five public elementary schools and one public middle school operated by the town. The town has one public high school operated by the Hokkaido Board of Education. Erimo Elementary School (built in 2000) is completely powered by electricity generated by its own windmill.

== Transportation ==
=== Railways ===
Erimo has never had passenger railway services. The nearest train station was Samani Station on the JR Hokkaido Hidaka Main Line. However, no trains have operated between Mukawa and Samani since January 2015, due to storm damage. Plans to restore this section of the line have been abandoned, due to declining passenger numbers and very high maintenance costs, and the section was officially closed on 1 April 2021, and replaced by a bus service.

=== Highways ===
- National Route 336

== Local attractions ==
- Cape Erimo (Erimo-misaki), te southernmost point of Hokkaido. The cape was made famous by Shinichi Mori's enka song Erimo Misaki. It is supposed to be a romantic place to visit. The cape hosts a population of Kurile seals, as well as a museum dedicated to wind (kaze-no-yakata).
- Pirikanoka, an Ainu sacred site is a designated National Place of Scenic Beauty
- Saruru Mountain Trail, National Historic Site
- Erimo Town Fisheries Museum
- Golden Road (黄金道路, Ōgon-dōro), the road north to Hiroo was carved through the Hidaka Mountains on the coast, it was given this nickname as it cost so much to build.
- Shoya Sakura Park (庶野桜公園, Shoya-sakura-kōen) is located on a hill overlooking the Pacific Ocean. The park has several variations of cherry blossoms numbering approximately 1,500 trees. In early-to-mid May, these cherry blossoms bloom.
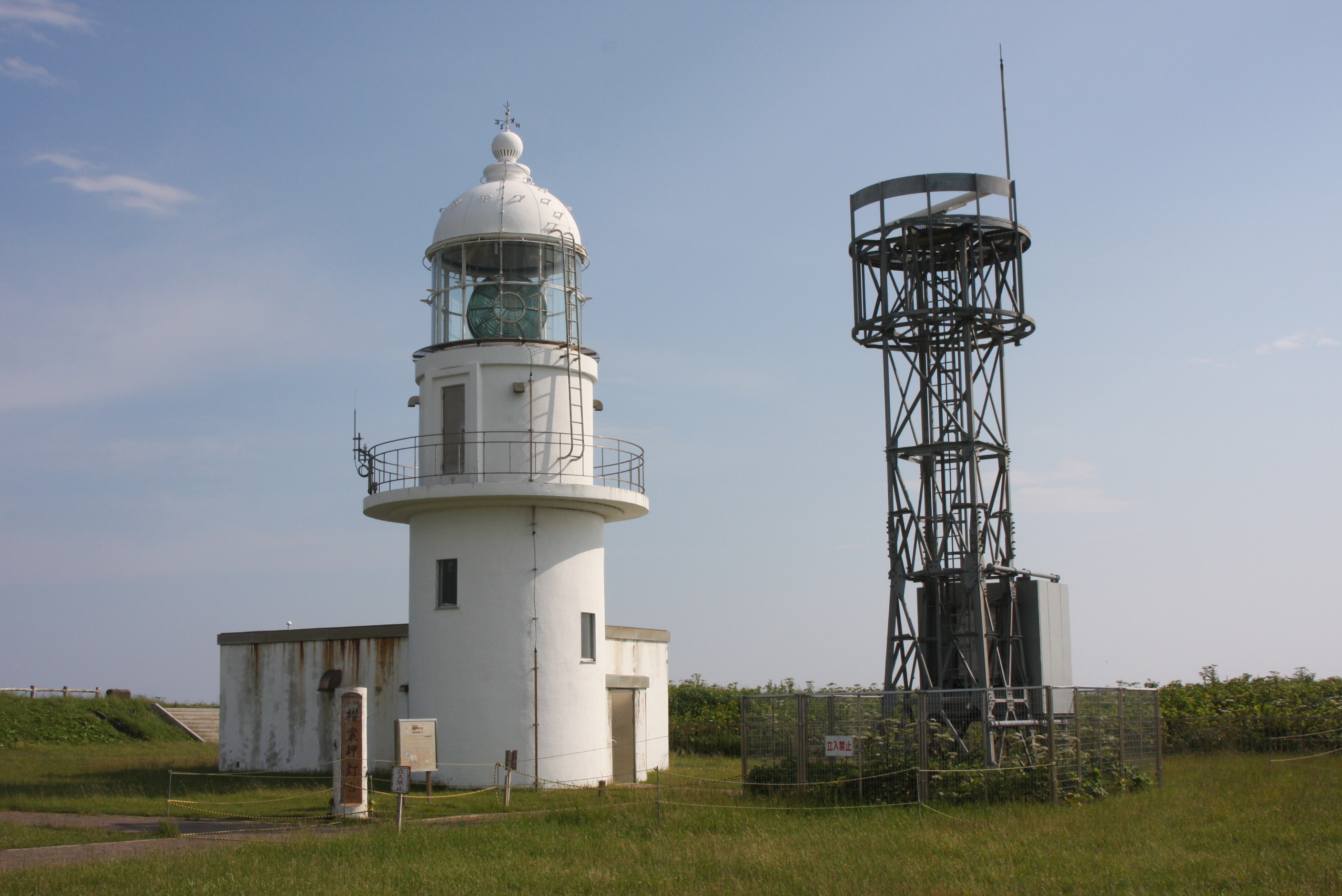
Cape Erimo Lighthouse

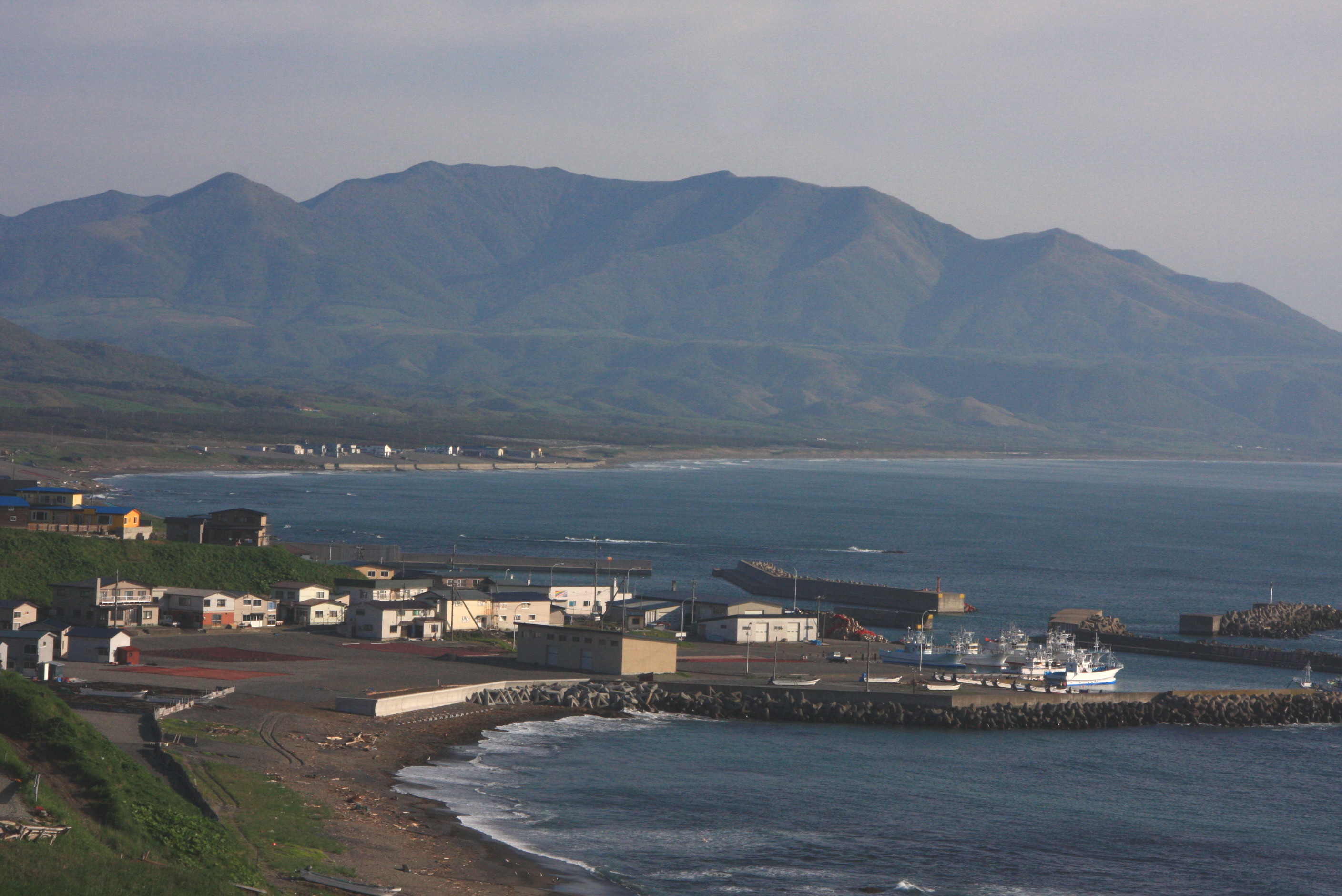
Mount Toyoni

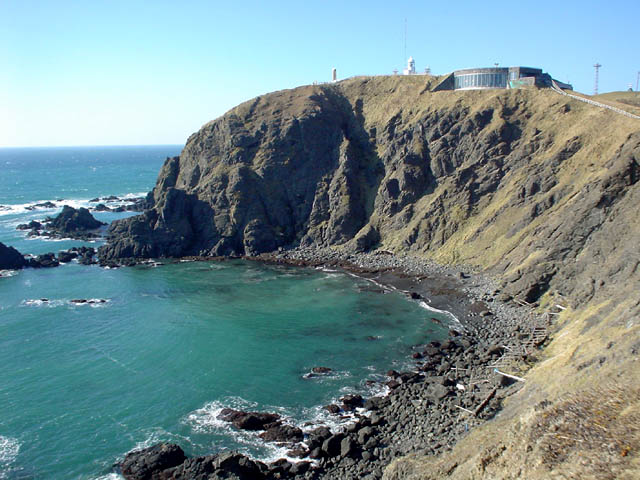
Kaze-no-yakata

=== Events ===
Mid-January holds the annual Pickling Competition. The housewives of Erimo battle in a competition of homemade pickles. The entrants compete for bragging rights with various pickles, such as sushi rice with pickled radish and sake lees, the locally produced salmon and sandfish.

In early March, the town holds a mini volleyball tournament. Volleyball is popular among the townspeople, and approximately 150 people participate in this tournament.

The Open Auto Camping and Park Golf Course at Hyakuninhama (百人浜) is open from May to October. The camping sites include 10 bungalows, 19 auto partitions and about 100 tent lots. The Hyakuninhama Park Golf Course is popular with the locals as well as park golf enthusiasts.

In Shinichi Mori's song Erimo Misaki there is a line which states Erimo's Spring is a Spring with nothing (襟裳の春は何もない春です). In response to this, the youth of the town created an event called Erimo's Spring is a Spring with something (えりもの春には何かがある). During this event there are many events held including concerts, quiz competitions and karaoke.

Erimo's Exciting Forest Creation Tree-Planting Ceremony (えりもワクワク森林づくり植樹祭, Erimo-wakuwaku-shinrin-zukuri-shokujusai) is held in late May and is a greening project. The townspeople are promoting the creation of a rich forest by planting Sakhalin fir and pine every year. Thanks to the endeavors of projects such as this the area around Erimo has changed from a desert into a lush forest.

Starting in mid-July kelp harvesting begins. Fishing and kelp harvesting are a major industry for Erimo and so from mid-July until September many townspeople assist the harvest in the early morning and then go on to their regular jobs. On a clear day following a rainy day, it is not uncommon for many people to take a day off work/school to assist the harvest.

The Erimo Lighthouse Festival (えりも灯台まつり, Erimo-tōdai-matsuri) is held every August. Spectators enjoy a variety of performances from local entertainers, as well as popular songs. The most highly anticipated festival event for the residents of Erimo and the Hidaka area is the display of fireworks.

In September, around the time that kelp harvesting is finished the townspeople have an Autumn Festival. Each district has their own festival in which men from around town carry a portable shrine throughout the city to pray to and give thanks to the Shinto gods of the town.

On the first Sunday of October the town has its Gifts from the Sea and Mountains Festival (えりも海と山の幸フェスティバル, Erimo-umi-to-yama-no-sachi-fesutibaru). While this event showcases Erimo's local products, the most popular attraction is the "salmon snag." There is also a raffle and "rice cake throw 'n' catch."

== Mascot ==
Windy-kun, the town's mascot

Erimo's mascot is Windy-kun (ウインディーくん, Uindī-kun). His name comes from Cape Erimo Kaze no Yakata. He is a harbor seal who wears a cape due to strong winds associated with the town. He is unveiled in 1997.
