= Utoma Station =

Railway station in Samani, Hokkaido, Japan

Coordinates: 42.1349°N 142.8829°E

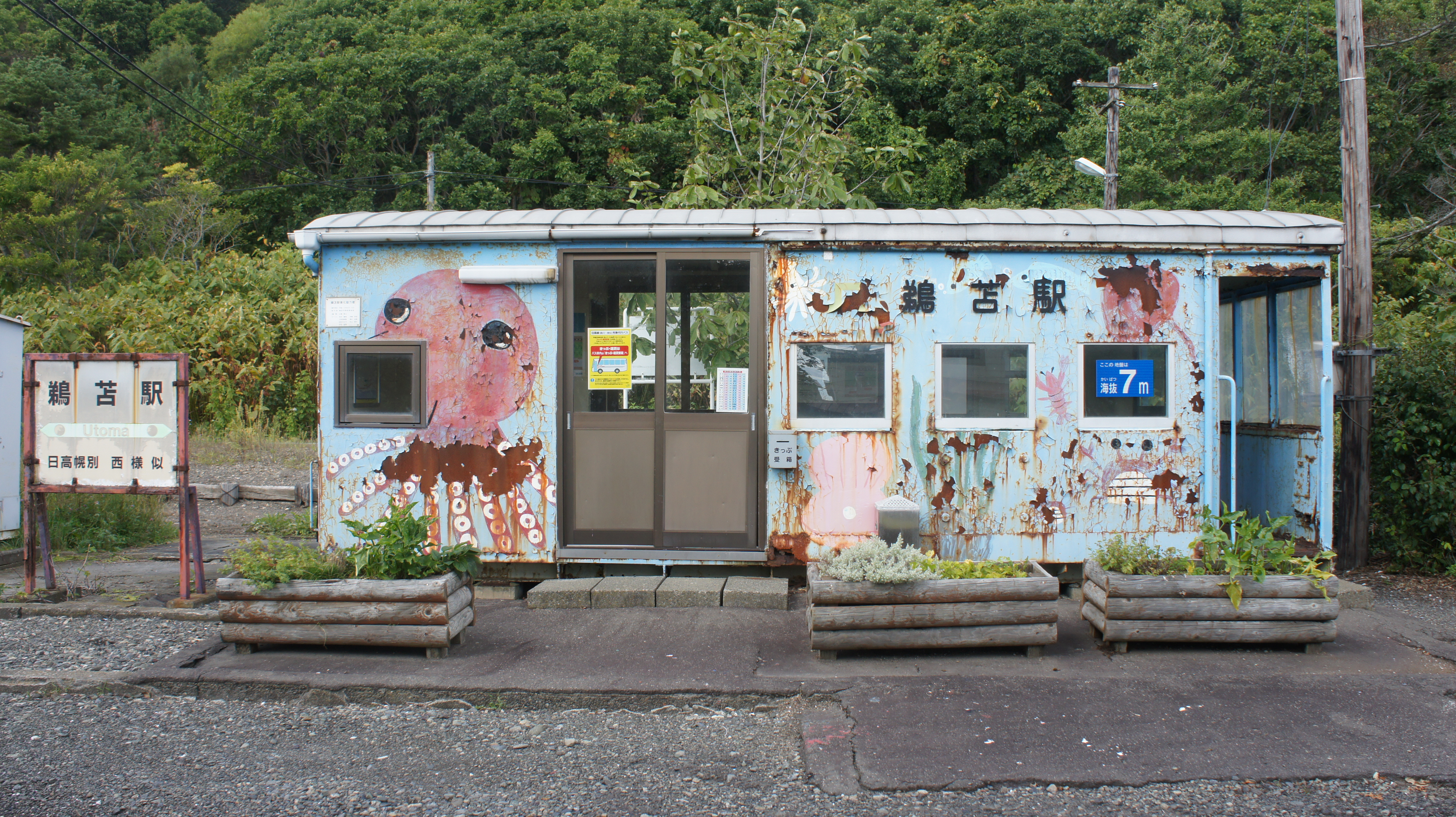
JR Hidaka-Main-Line, Utoma Station building

Utoma Station (鵜苫駅, Utoma-eki) was a railway station on the Hidaka Main Line in Samani, Hokkaido, Japan, operated by the Hokkaido Railway Company (JR Hokkaido).

Services on the 116 km section of the line between Mukawa and Samani have been suspended indefinitely since January 2015 due to storm damage.

== Lines ==
- Hidaka Main Line

== Adjacent stations ==
«	Service	»
Hidaka Main Line
Hidaka-Horobetsu	Local	Nishi-Samani

== History ==
The station opened on 10 August 1937. With the privatization of Japanese National Railways (JNR) on 1 April 1987, the station came under the control of JR Hokkaido.

== See also ==
- List of railway stations in Japan
