= Samani, Hokkaido =

Samani 様似町 Samani-chō
- Town
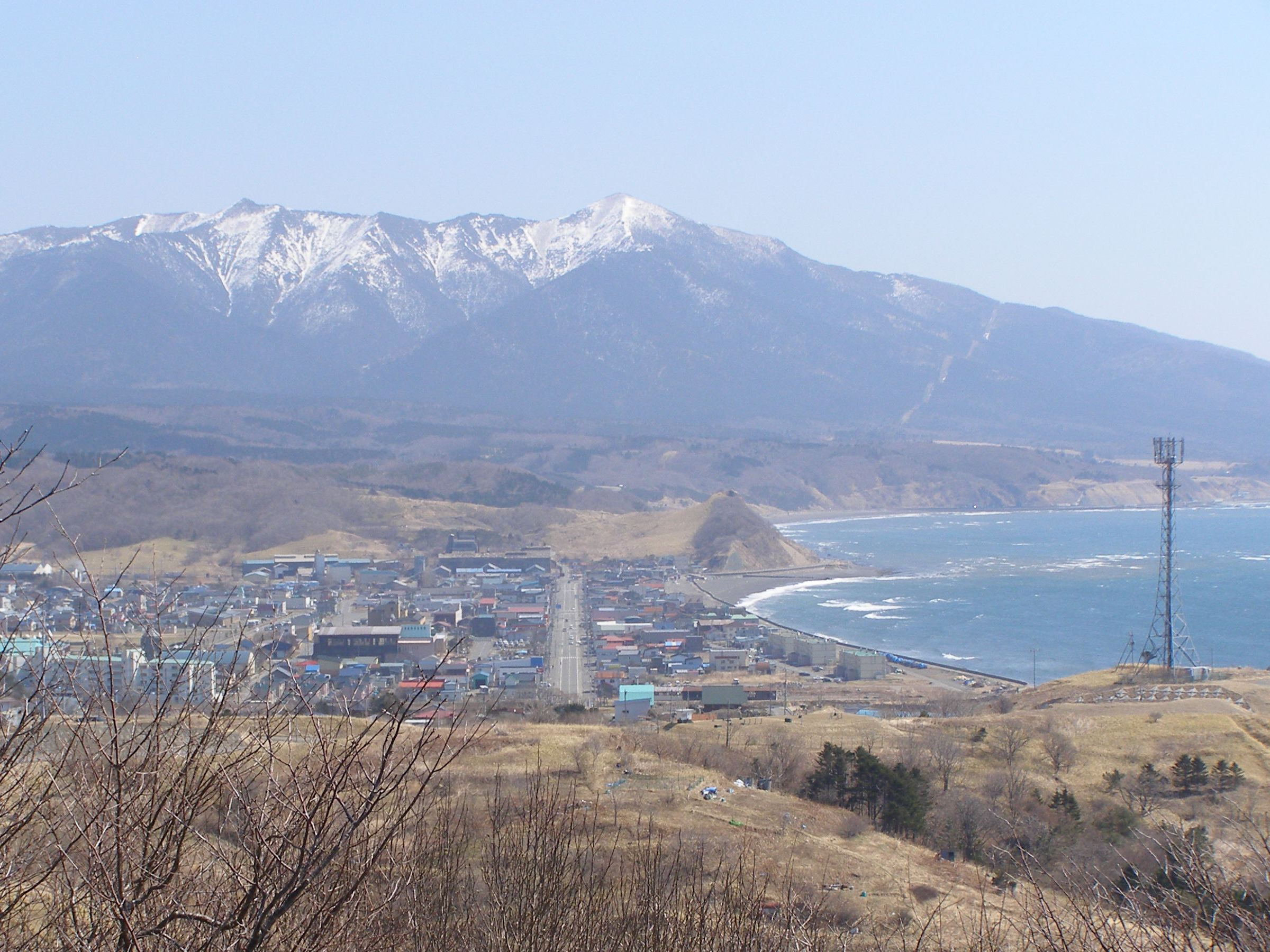
- Panorama view of Mount Apoi and Samani Town

- Flag Seal

- Location of Samani in Hokkaido (Hidaka Subprefecture)
- Interactive map of Samani
- Coordinates: 42°07′40″N 142°56′01″E
- Country: Japan
- Region: Hokkaido
- Prefecture: Hokkaido (Hidaka Subprefecture)
- District: Samani

Area
  - Total: 364.30 km^{2} (140.66 sq mi)

Population (January 31, 2026)
  - Total: 3,668
  - Density: 10.07/km^{2} (26.08/sq mi)
- Time zone: UTC+09:00 (JST)
- City hall address: Ōdori 21, 1-Chōme, Samani-chō, Samani-gun, Hokkaidō 058-0014
- Climate: Cfb
- Website: www.samani.jp
- Symbols
- Flower: Callianthemum miyabeanum (ヒダカソウ, Hidaka-sō)
- Tree: Pinus parviflora Sieb. & Zucc.

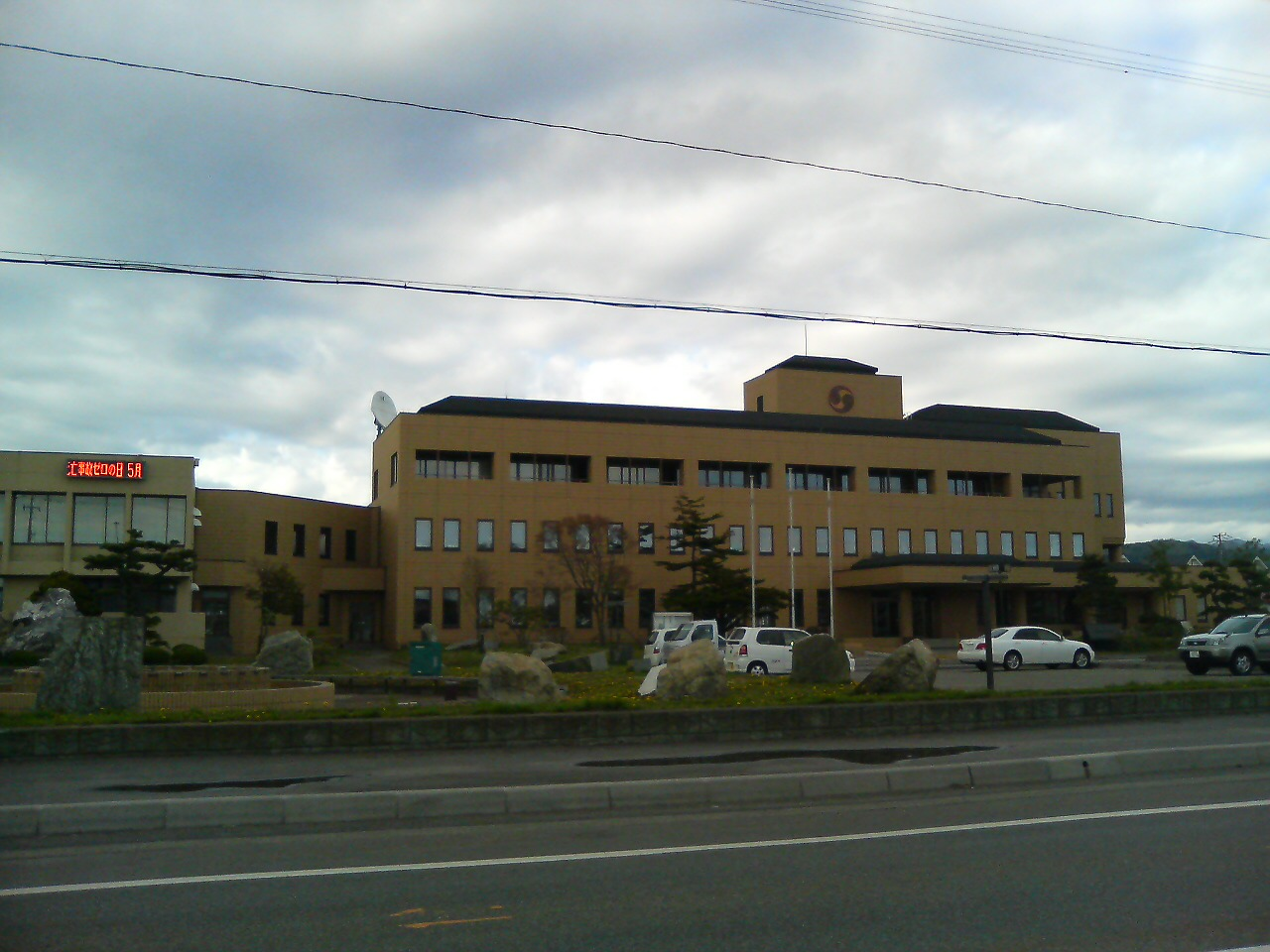
Samani Town Hall

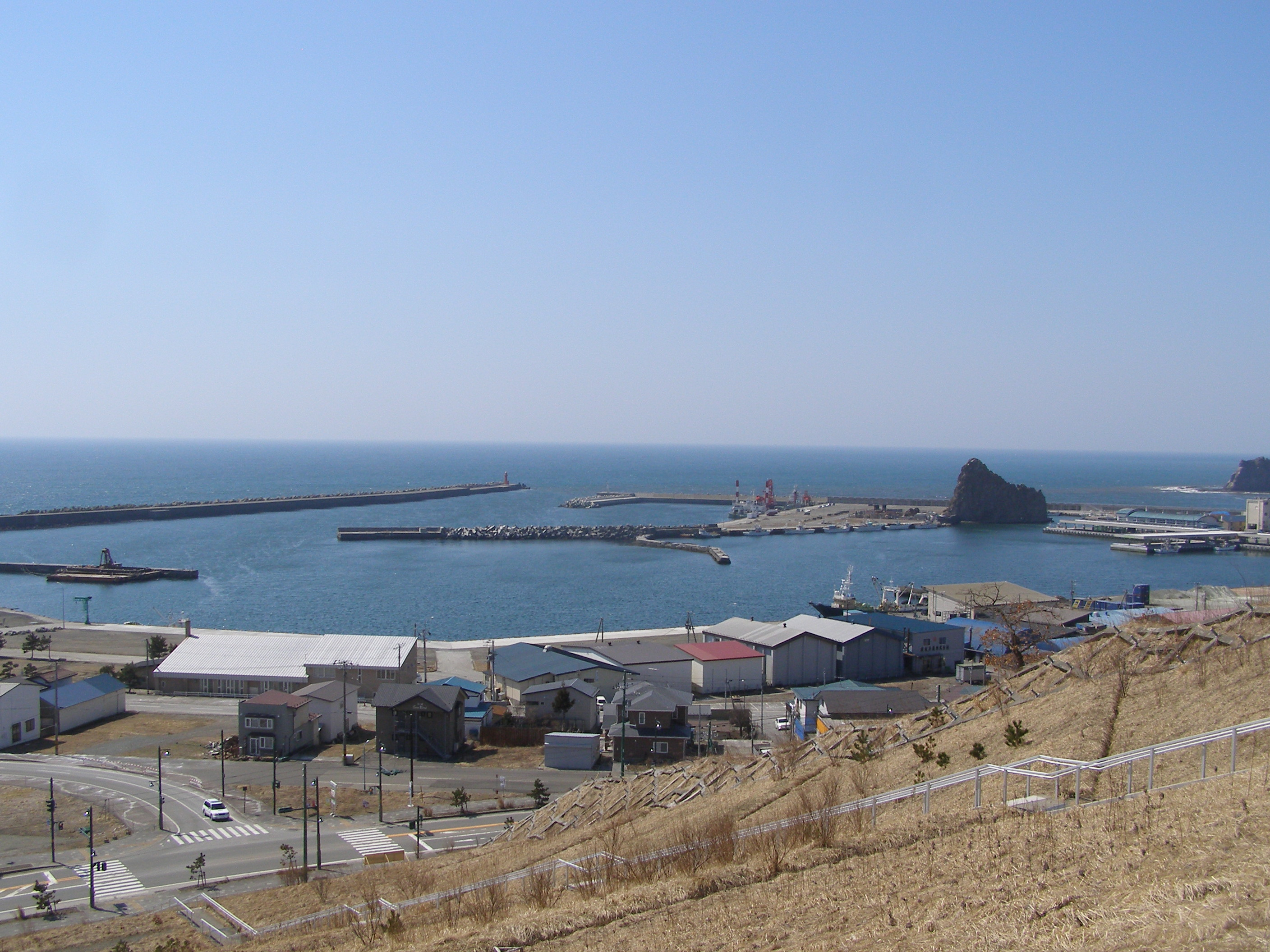
Samani fishing port

Samani (様似町, Samani-chō) is a town located in Hidaka Subprefecture, Hokkaidō, Japan. As of 31 January 2026, the town had an estimated population of 3,668 in 1995 households, and a population density of 10 people per km^{2}. The total area of the town is 364.30 km^{2} (140.66 sq mi).

== Geography ==
Samani is located in southern Hokkaido, in the southern coastal area of the Hidaka Subprefecture. The Hidaka Mountains stretching from the north, along with Mount Apoi, Lake Horoman, and the surrounding area of the Horoman Japanese White Pine, are designated as part of the Hidakasanmyaku-Erimo-Tokachi National Park. In the southern part of town, the mountain ranges approach the Pacific Ocean. Hidaka Yabakei Gorge, located between Fuyushima and Horoman, is particularly known for its scenic beauty and steep paths. The Shamani Mountain Trail was opened during the Edo period. The coastal area, including Hidaka Yabakei Gorge, is also designated as part of the Hidakasanmyaku-Erimo-Tokachi National Park.

=== Neighboring municipalities ===
- Urakawa
- Erimo
- Hiroo

=== Climate ===
Samani has a humid continental climate (Köppen Dfb) with warm summers and cold winters. With an alternate definition, using the −3 °C (27 °F) isotherm, Samani falls in the rare oceanic climate (Cfb) of the east coast of the continents due to the warm Kuroshio current. Owing to its slightly more southerly latitude, easterly aspect and location on the sea, snowfall is much lighter than in the major cities of western Hokkaido. Precipitation in heaviest in the summer months when remnant typhoons may approach. Year-round sunshine, although less than in the Tokachi Plain, is also higher than western Hokkaido.

=== Demographics ===
Per Japanese census data, the population of Samani has declined in recent decades.

Historical population
Year	Pop.	±%
1970	8,834	—
1980	7,986	−9.6%
1990	7,159	−10.4%
2000	6,210	−13.3%
2010	5,114	−17.6%
2020	4,043	−20.9%

== History ==
The indigenous Ainu people have lived in this area since ancient times, and ruins from their Jomon period ancestors have been excavated throughout the town. During the Edo period (around 1600), large numbers of Japanese people began moving to the area to mine gold dust. Samani was proclaimed a village in 1906 under the second-class town and village system. It was raised to town status in 1952.

== Government ==
Samani has a mayor-council form of government with a directly elected mayor and a unicameral town council of ten members. Samani, as part of Hidaka Subprefecture, contributes two members to the Hokkaidō Prefectural Assembly. In terms of national politics, the town is part of the Hokkaidō 9th district of the lower house of the Diet of Japan.

== Economy ==
The local economy is dominated by commercial fishing, with four fishing ports (Utoma, Samani, Fuyushima, and Asahi) and two fisheries cooperative branches (Hidaka Central Fisheries Cooperative Samani Branch and Erimo Fisheries Cooperative Fuyushima Branch). The town's fishing grounds, home to a wide variety of fish species, are influenced by the warm (Tsugaru current) and cold (Kuril current) that flow through the foreshore. In addition to salmon, trout, and cod, the town also produces a wide variety of seafood, including octopus, sea urchin, whelks, and kelp. In addition, field crops, rice cultivation, dairy farming, livestock farming, and horse farming are also practiced.

== Education ==
Samani has one public elementary school and one public middle school operated by the town. The town's public high school closed in 2014.

== Transportation ==
Samani was served by the JR Hokkaido Hidaka Main Line. However, no trains have operated between Mukawa and Samani since January 2015, due to storm damage. Plans to restore this section of the line have been abandoned, due to declining passenger numbers and very high maintenance costs, and the section was officially closed on 1 April 2021, and replaced by a bus service.

Defunct railway stations in Samani: Samani - Nishi-Samani - Utoma

=== Highways ===
- National Route 336

== Local attractions ==
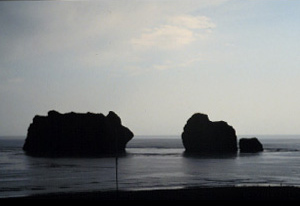
The Oya-ko rock formation off the coast of Samani

- Oya-ko rocks (親子岩, Oya-ko iwa) offshore rock formation
- Mount Apoi Geopark (UNESCO Global Geopark); Mount Apoi (アポイ岳, Apoi-dake) is next to the town. An onsen (hot spring resort) is at the base of the mountain, which is a popular climb among tourists and locals.
- Mt. Apoi Alpine Plant Community - Special Natural Monument
- Horoman Japanese White Pine Grove
- Toju-in, one of the three official Buddhist temples in Ezo established by the Tokugawa shogunate

== Culture ==
=== Mascots ===
Kanran-kun and Apoi-chan, the town's mascots

Samani's mascots are Kanran-kun (カンランくん) and Apoi-chan (アポイちゃん).

- Kanran-kun is a hard willing green peridotite fairy who has a strong sense of justice and will but he is sloppy. He loves to climb mountains and play drums. His favorite food is whelk curry. His quote is "three years on a stone" (石の上にも三年). He is also a huge fan of rock music and can cook dried kelp.
- Apoi-chan is a bright and gentle pink flower fairy who is a veterinarian. She is also a skilled tenipon player. Her favorite food is strawberry ice cream. Her mantra is "10 people, 10 colors" (十人十色). Her favourite song is "Sekai ni Hitotsu Dake no Hana" by SMAP. She can energize people.
