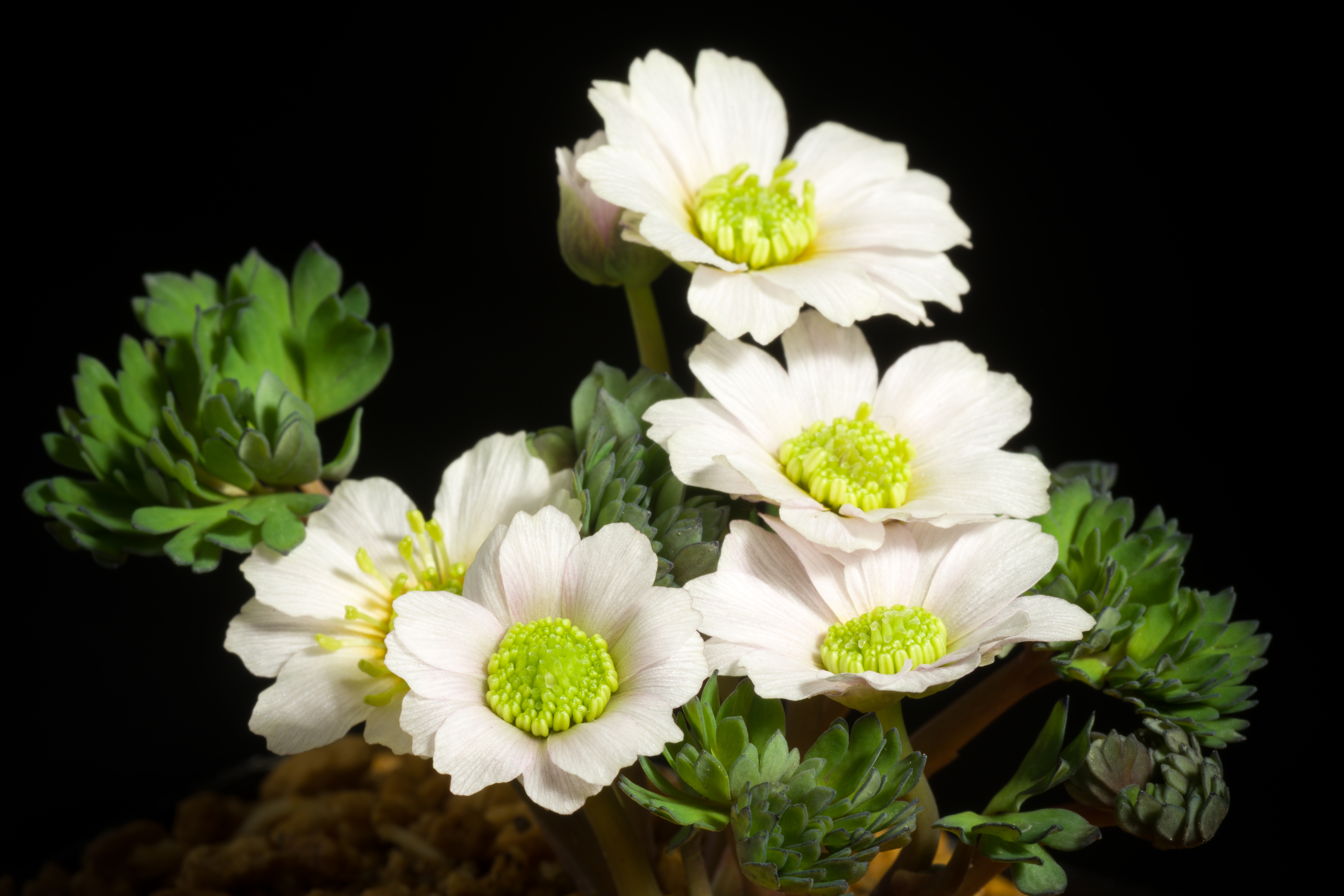

Scientific classification
- Kingdom: Plantae
- Clade: Tracheophytes
- Clade: Angiosperms
- Clade: Eudicots
- Order: Ranunculales
- Family: Ranunculaceae
- Genus: Callianthemum
- Species: C. miyabeanum

Binomial name
- Callianthemum miyabeanum Tatew.

= Callianthemum miyabeanum =

Species of flowering plant

Callianteum miyabeanum, known as Hidaka-sō (ヒダカソウ) in Japan, is a species of flowering plant in the Ranunculaceae. It is endemic to Mount Apoi in the Hidaka Mountains of Hokkaidō, Japan.

== Status on Japanese red list ==
The plant is in the endangered category on the red list of threatened plants of Japan.
