= Tōro Station =

Railway station in Shibecha, Hokkaido, Japan

B58 Tōro Station 塘路駅
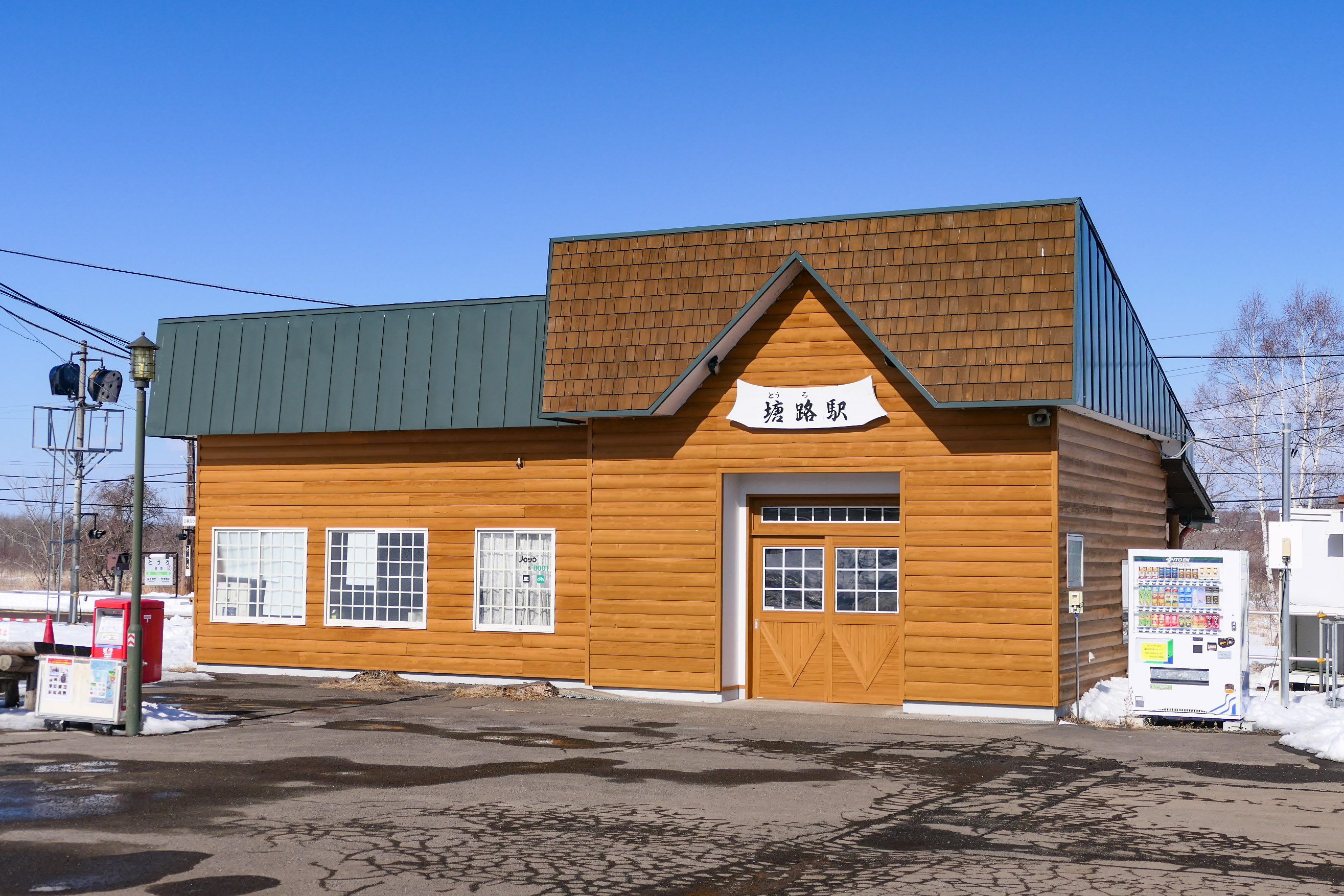
- Tōro Station building in September 2018

General information
- Location: Tōro, Shibecha, Kawakami District, Hokkaido 088-2261; Japan
- Coordinates: 43°9′6.19″N 144°29′48.52″E
- System: regional rail
- Operator: JR Hokkaido
- Line: Senmō Main Line
- Distance: 24.3 km from Higashi-Kushiro
- Platforms: 2 side platforms
- Tracks: 2

Other information
- Status: Unstaffed
- Station code: B58
- Website: Official website

History
- Opened: 15 September 1927; 99 years ago

Passengers
- FY2022: 12 daily

Services
Preceding station	JR Hokkaido	Following station
Kayanuma towards Abashiri	Senmō Main Line Local	Hosooka towards Kushiro
Location
- Location within Hokkaido Location within Japan

Tōro Station (塘路駅, Tōro-eki) is a railway station located in the town of Shibecha, Hokkaidō, Japan. It is operated by JR Hokkaido. The station was the setting for the 1991 film Deer Friend.

== Lines ==
The station is served by the Senmō Main Line, and lies 24.3 km from the starting point of the line at Higashi-Kushiro .

== Layout ==
Tōro Station has two opposed side platforms and two tracks. Platform 1 adjacent to the station building side is the outbound main line (towards Kushiro), while Platform 2 on the opposite side is the inbound main line (towards Abashiri). However, signaling allows trains to enter both platforms from the Kushiro side, and Platform 2 also allows trains to depart in the outbound direction, allowing for return service from this station to Kushiro. It formerly had a secondary main track and freight platform. The station building was reconstructed in 1953. In 1998, the exterior was renovated to resemble a log cabin. The station is unattended.

=== Platforms ===
1	■ Senmō Main Line	for Kushiro
2	■ Senmō Main Line	for Mashū and Abashiri

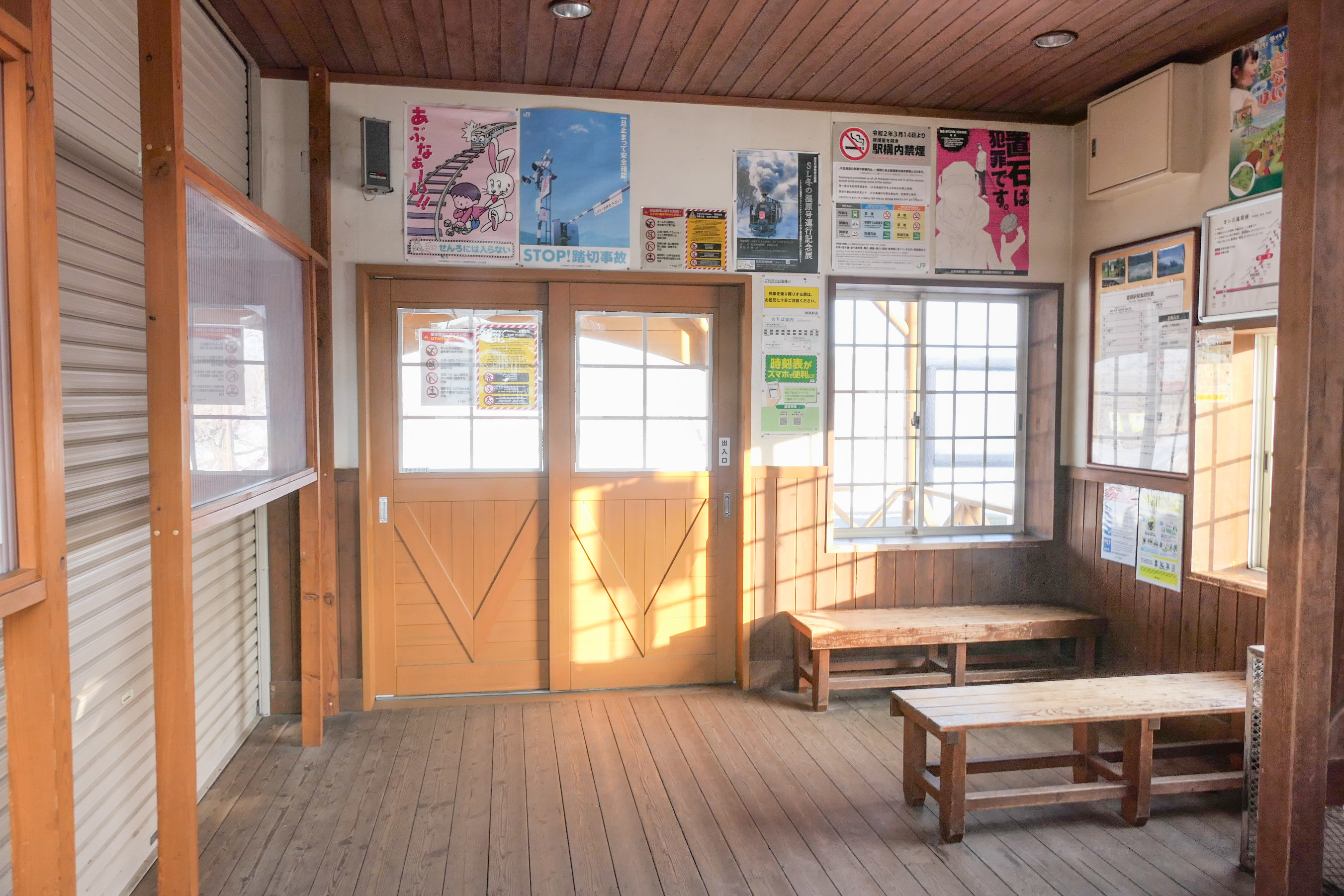
Waiting Room

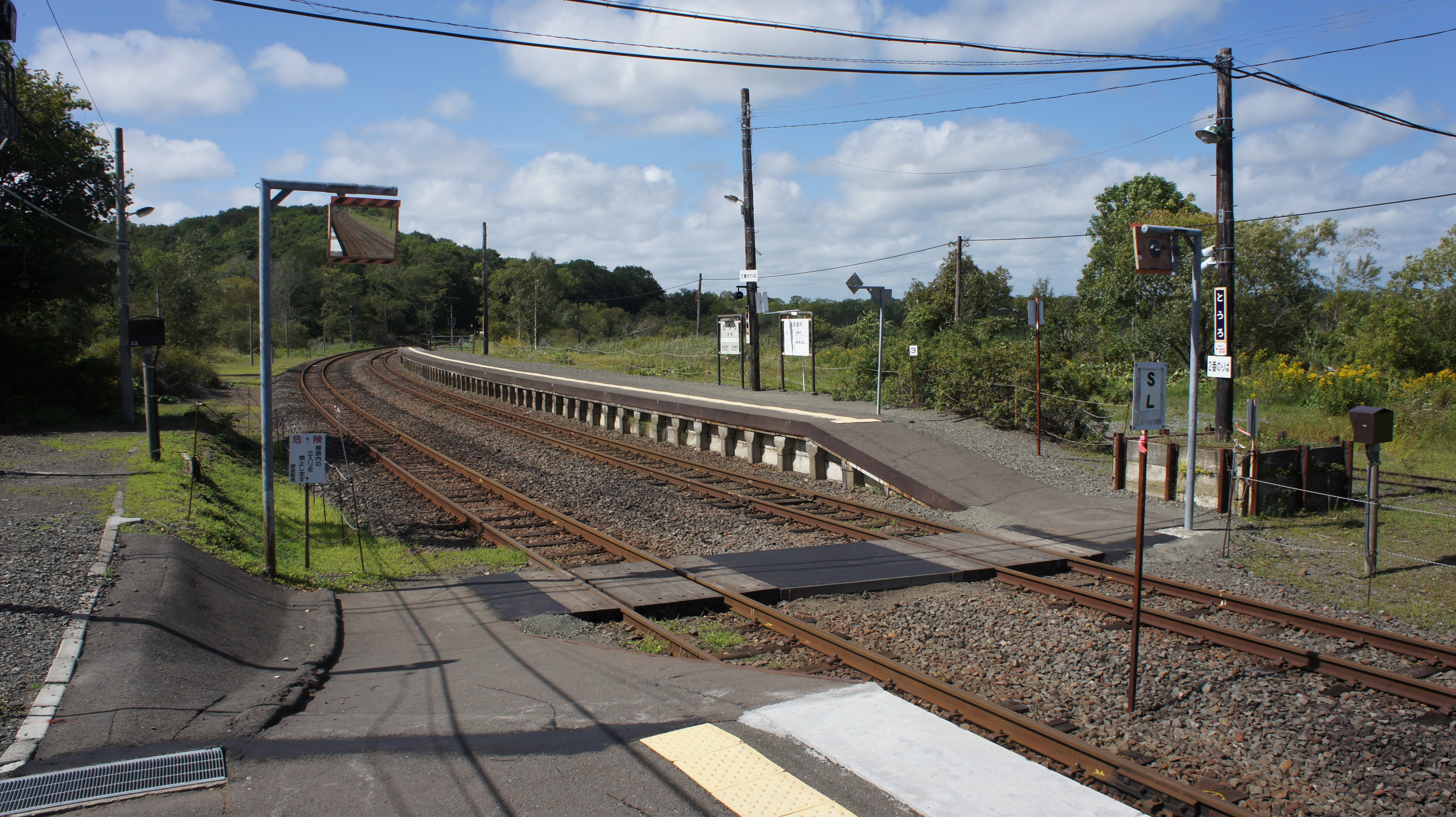
Platform and level crossing

== History ==
The station opened on 15 September 1927 with the opening of the Ministry of Railways Senmō Main Line between Kushiro Station and Shibecha Station. Following the privatization of the Japanese National Railways on 1 April 1987, the station came under the control of JR Hokkaido. The current station building was reconstructed in 1988.

== Passenger statistics ==
In fiscal 2022, the station was used by an average of 12 passengers daily.

== Surrounding area ==
- Lake Toro
- Kushiro Wetlands
- Lake Toro Eco-Museum Center ALCOTT (Museum)
- Shibecha Town Local History Museum

== See also ==
- List of railway stations in Japan
