= Minami-Teshikaga Station =

Railway station in Teshikaga, Hokkaido, Japan

Minami-Teshikaga Station 南弟子屈駅
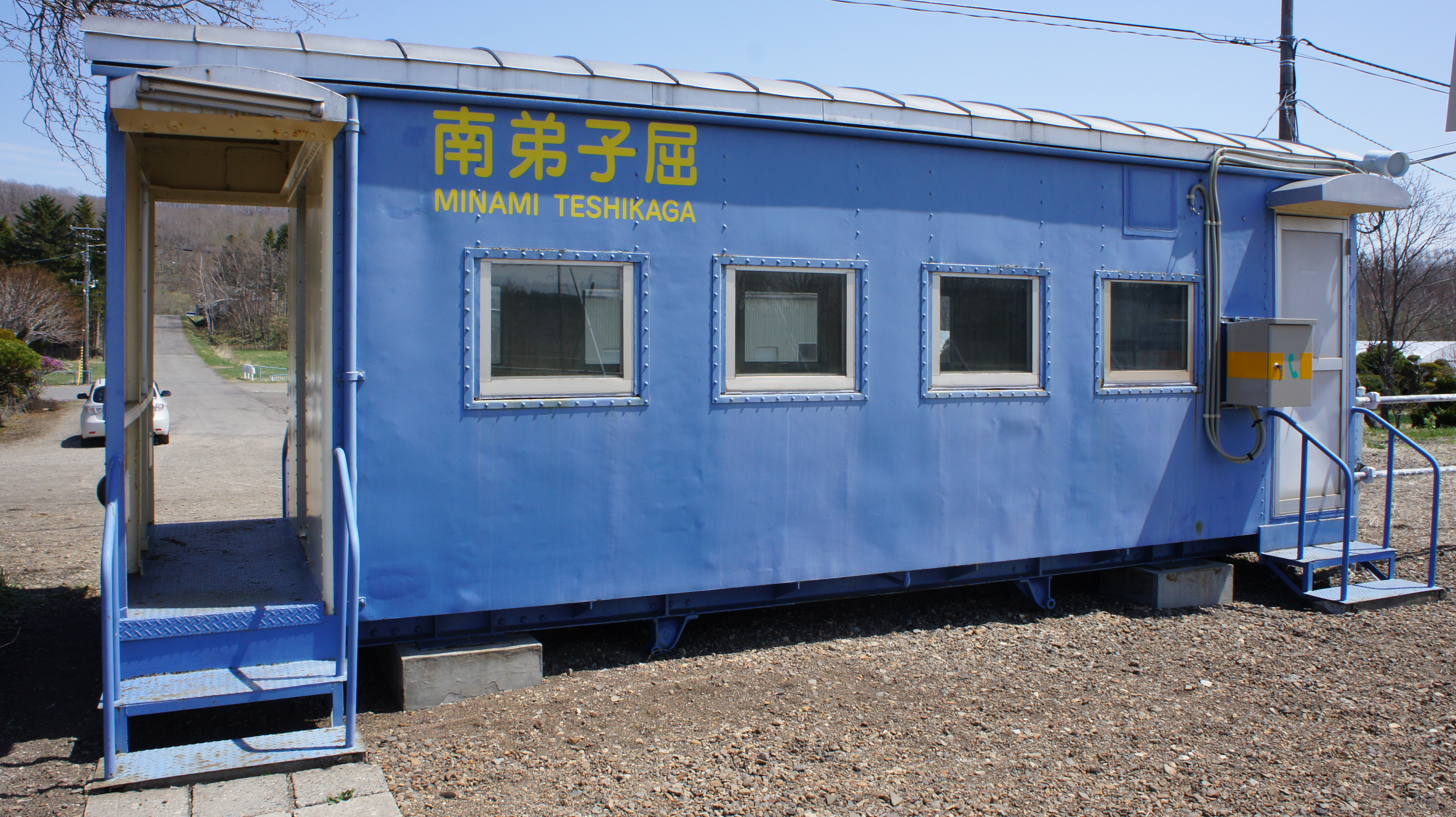
- Minami-Teshikaga station building in May 2017

General information
- Location: 144 Kumaushigenya 27 Sen Nishi, Teshikaga, Kawakami District, Kushiro Subprefecture, Hokkaido; Japan
- Coordinates: 43.4287°N 144.5142°E
- Operator: JR Hokkaido
- Line: ■ Senmō Main Line
- Distance: 62.3 km from Higashi-Kushiro
- Platforms: 1 side platform
- Tracks: 1

Other information
- Station code: B63

History
- Opened: 15 August 1929
- Closed: 14 March 2020
Location

Minami-Teshikaga Station (南弟子屈駅, Minami-Teshikaga-eki) was a railway station on the Senmō Main Line in Teshikaga, Hokkaido, Japan, operated by the Hokkaido Railway Company (JR Hokkaido). It was numbered "B63".

== Lines ==
Minami-Teshikaga Station was served by the Senmō Main Line, and lied 62.3 km from the starting point of the line at Higashi-Kushiro.

== Station layout ==
The station had one side platform serving a single bidirectional track.

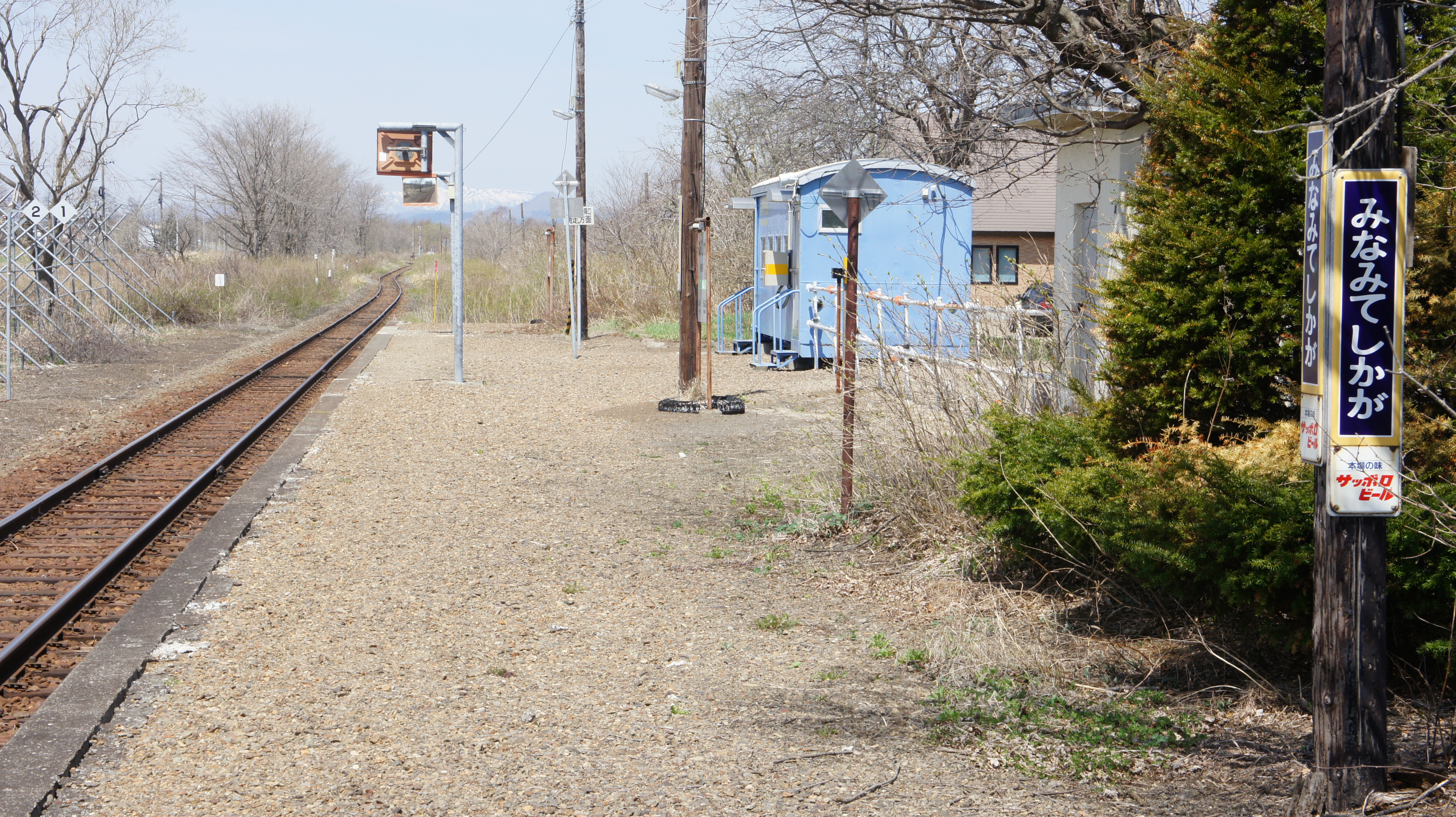
The station platform in May 2017

== Adjacent stations ==
«	Service	»
Senmō Main Line
Rapid Shiretoko: Does not stop at this station
Mashū	Local	Isobunnai

== History ==
The station opened on 15 August 1929. With the privatization of Japanese National Railways (JNR) on 1 April 1987, the station came under the control of JR Hokkaido.

On 14 March 2020, this station was closed due to low numbers of passengers.

== See also ==
- List of railway stations in Japan
