= Gojikkoku Station =

Railway station in Shibecha, Japan

Coordinates: 43.2387°N 144.5454°E

Gojikkoku Station 五十石駅
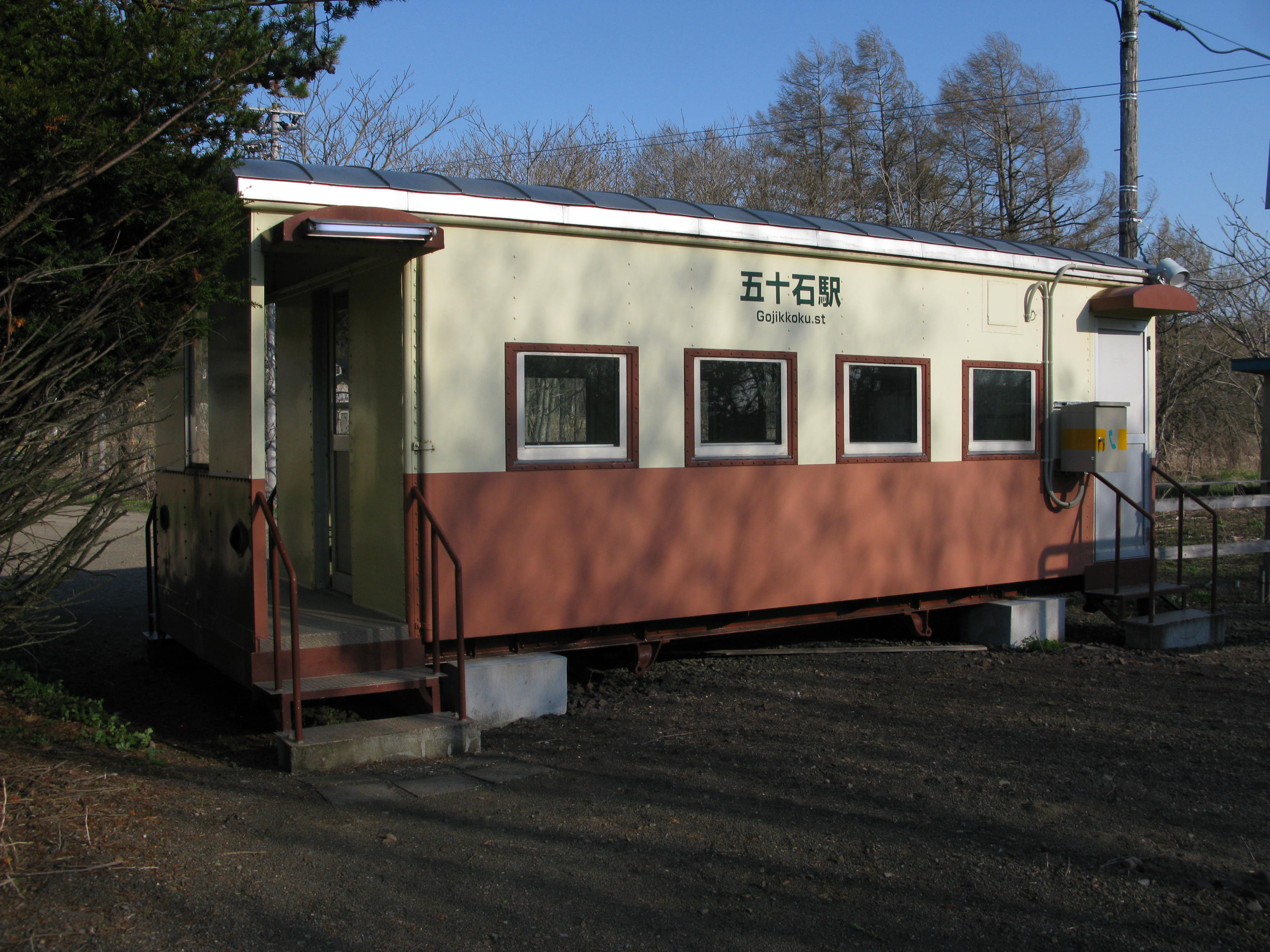
- Gojikkoku Station in May 2016

General information
- Location: Osotsubetsu, Shibecha-chō, Kawakami-gun, Hokkaido 088-2331; Japan
- Operator: JR Hokkaido
- Line: ■ Senmo Main Line
- Distance: 36.7 km from Kushiro
- Platforms: 1 side platform
- Tracks: 1

Other information
- Status: Unstaffed
- Station code: B60

History
- Opened: 27 September 1927

Passengers
- FY2015: <1 daily
Location
- Location within Japan

Gojikkoku Station (Japanese: 五十石駅, Hepburn: Gojikkoku-eki) is a railway station on the Senmo Main Line in Shibecha, Hokkaido, Japan, operated by Hokkaido Railway Company (JR Hokkaido). Opened in 1927, the station is now permanently closed.

== Lines ==
Gojikkoku Station is served by the Senmo Main Line, and lies 36.7 km from Kushiro. The station is numbered B60.

== Station layout ==
The station has one side platform serving a single bidirectional line. The station is unstaffed.

== Adjacent stations ==
«	Service	»
Senmo Main Line
Rapid Shiretoko: Does not stop at this station
Shibecha	Local	Kayanuma

== History ==
The station opened on 15 September 1927. With the privatization of Japanese National Railways (JNR) on 1 April 1987, the station came under the control of JR Hokkaido.

In September 2016, JR Hokkaido announced that it intended to close the station from the start of the revised timetable in March 2017, due to low passenger usage.

== Passenger statistics ==
In fiscal 2015, the station was used on average by less than one passenger daily. There were 3 users in 2015, but the number was estimated to drop to 1 by the next year.

== Surrounding area ==
- National Route 391

== See also ==
- List of railway stations in Japan
