= Isobunnai Station =

Railway station in Shibecha, Hokkaido, Japan

B62 Isobunnai Station 磯分内駅
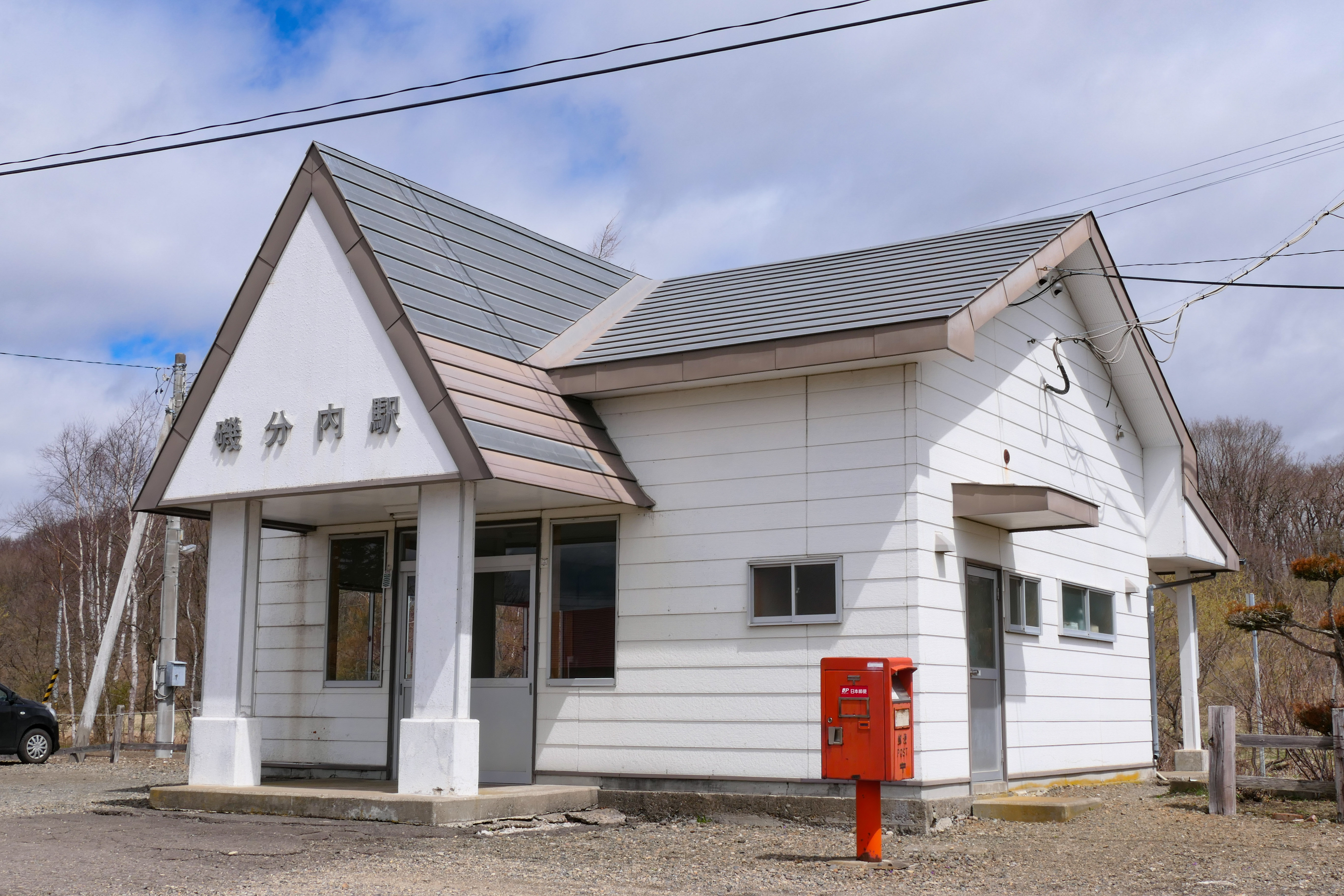
- Isobunnai Station building in May 2021

General information
- Location: 16 Senhigashi Kumaushigenya, Shibecha, Kawakami District, Hokkaido 088-3145; Japan
- Coordinates: 43°22′46.15″N 144°33′15.7″E
- System: regional rail
- Operator: JR Hokkaido
- Line: Senmō Main Line
- Distance: 55.8 km from Higashi-Kushiro
- Platforms: 1 side platform
- Tracks: 1

Other information
- Status: Unstaffed
- Station code: B62
- Website: Official website

History
- Opened: 15 August 1929; 97 years ago

Passengers
- FY2022: 12 daily

Services
Preceding station	JR Hokkaido	Following station
Mashū towards Abashiri	Senmō Main Line Local	Shibecha towards Kushiro
Location
- Location within Hokkaido Location within Japan

Isobunnai Station (磯分内駅, Isobunnai-eki) is a railway station located in the town of Shibecha, Hokkaidō, Japan. It is operated by JR Hokkaido. The station was the setting for the 1991 film Deer Friend.

== Lines ==
The station is served by the Senmō Main Line, and lies 55.8 km from the starting point of the line at Higashi-Kushiro .

== Layout ==
Isobunnai Station has one side platform serving bi-directional traffic. It previously had a second line (and side platform), a secondary line, and a freight platform. The station is unattended.

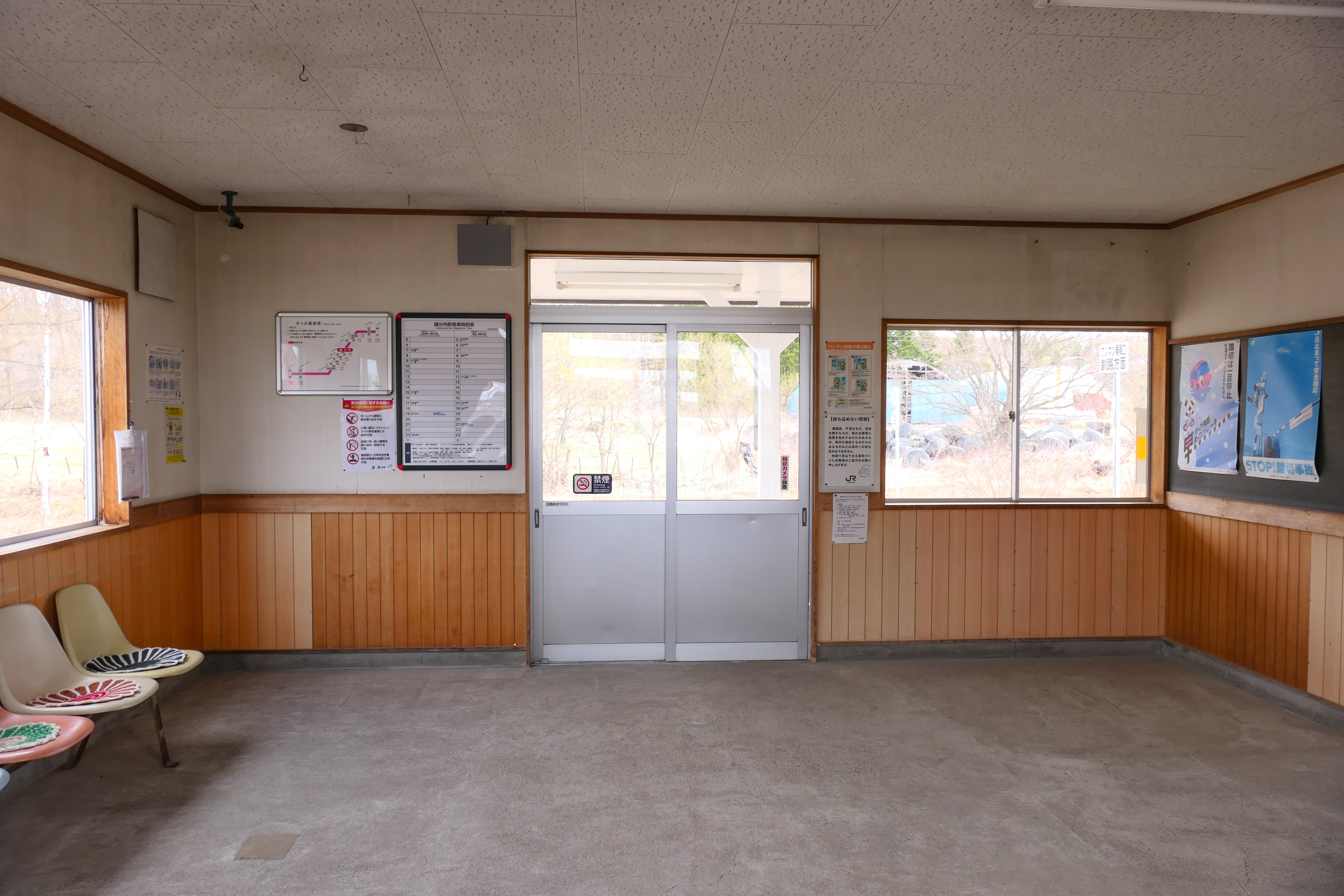
Waiting Room

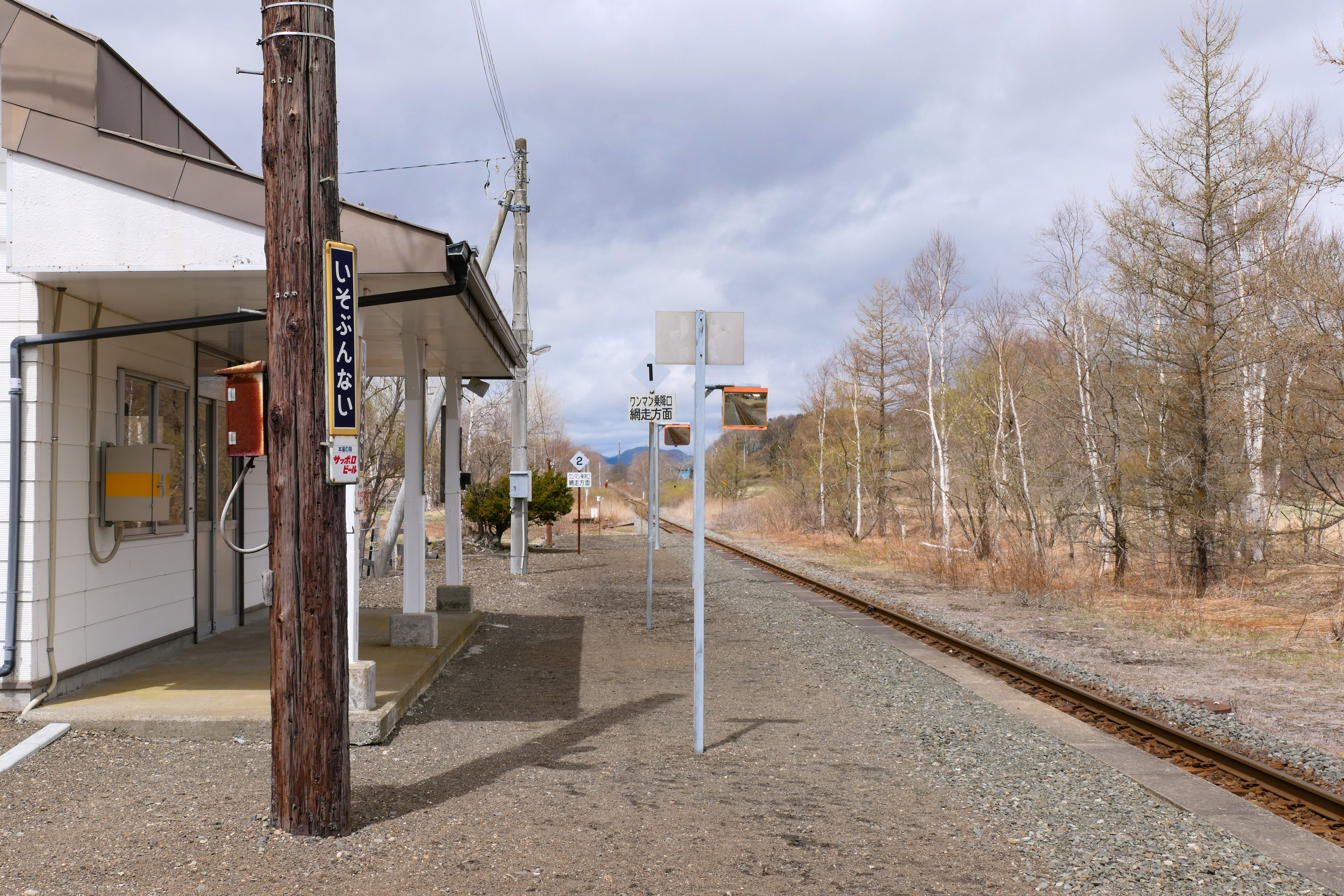
Platform

== History ==
The station opened on 15 August 1929 with the opening of the Ministry of Railways Senmō Main Line between Shibecha Station and Teshikaga Station. Following the privatization of the Japanese National Railways on 1 April 1987, the station came under the control of JR Hokkaido.

== Passenger statistics ==
In fiscal 2022, the station was used by an average of 7 passengers daily.

== Surrounding area ==
- Hokkaido Prefectural Route 424 Isobunnai Station Line
- Japan National Route 391
- Shibecha Town Isobunnai Dairy Farm Center
- Shibecha Town Isobunnai Elementary School

== See also ==
- List of railway stations in Japan
