= Kayanuma Station =

Railway station in Shibecha, Hokkaido, Japan

B59 Kayanuma Station 茅沼駅
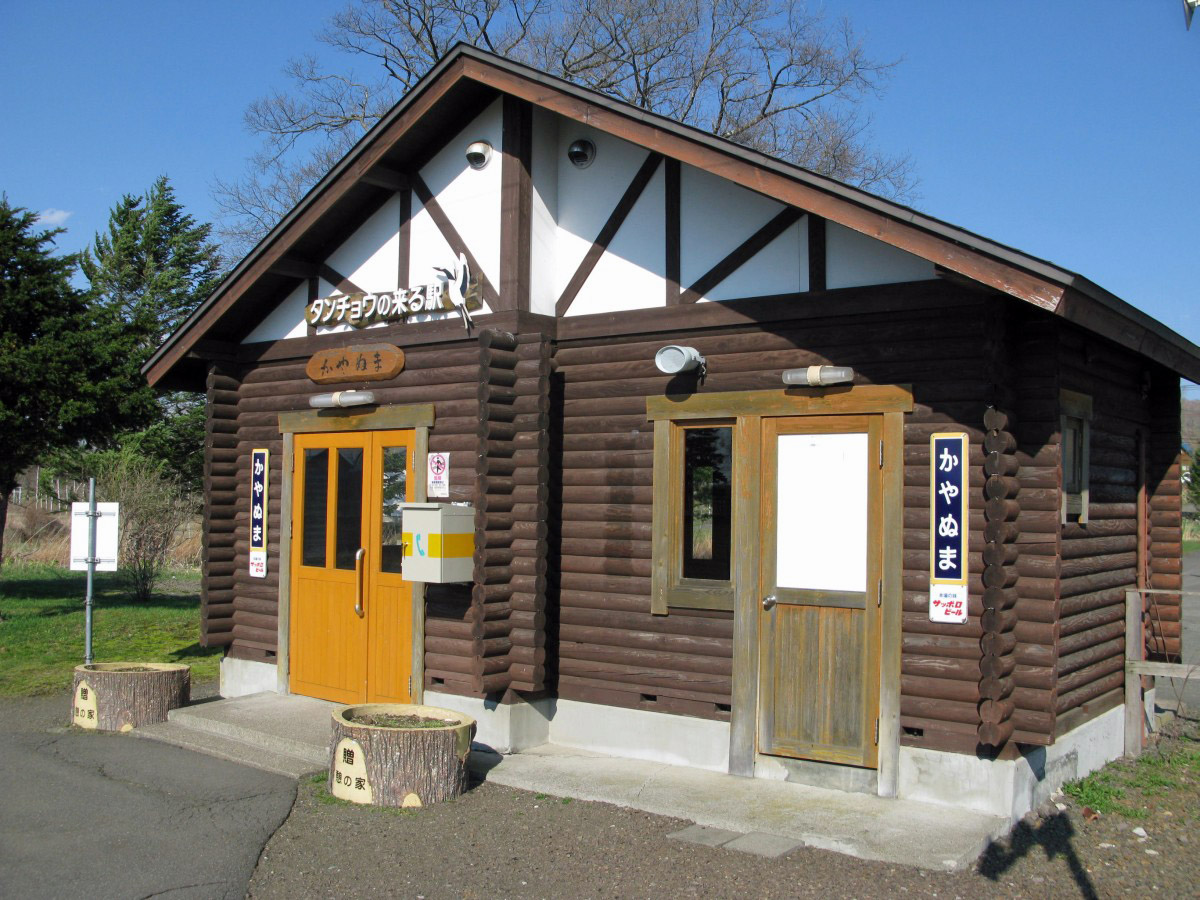
- Kayanuma Station station building (May 2016)

General information
- Location: Kita 17 Sen Kottarogenya, Shibecha, Kawakami District, Hokkaido 088-2266; Japan
- Coordinates: 43°12′7.55″N 144°30′13.64″E
- System: regional rail
- Operator: JR Hokkaido
- Line: Senmō Main Line
- Distance: 31.3 km from Higashi-Kushiro
- Platforms: 1 side platform
- Tracks: 1

Other information
- Status: Unstaffed
- Station code: B59
- Website: Official website

History
- Opened: 15 September 1927; 99 years ago

Passengers
- FY2022: 2 daily

Services
Preceding station	JR Hokkaido	Following station
Shibecha towards Abashiri	Senmō Main Line Local	Tōro towards Kushiro
Location
- Location within Hokkaido Location within Japan

Kayanuma Station (茅沼駅, Kayanuma-eki)is a railway station located in the town of Shibecha, Hokkaidō, Japan. It is operated by JR Hokkaido.

== Lines ==
The station is served by the Senmō Main Line, and lies 31.3 km from the starting point of the line at Higashi-Kushiro .

== Layout ==
Kayanuma Station has one side platform serving bidirectional traffic. The station building is a log cabin and is unattended.

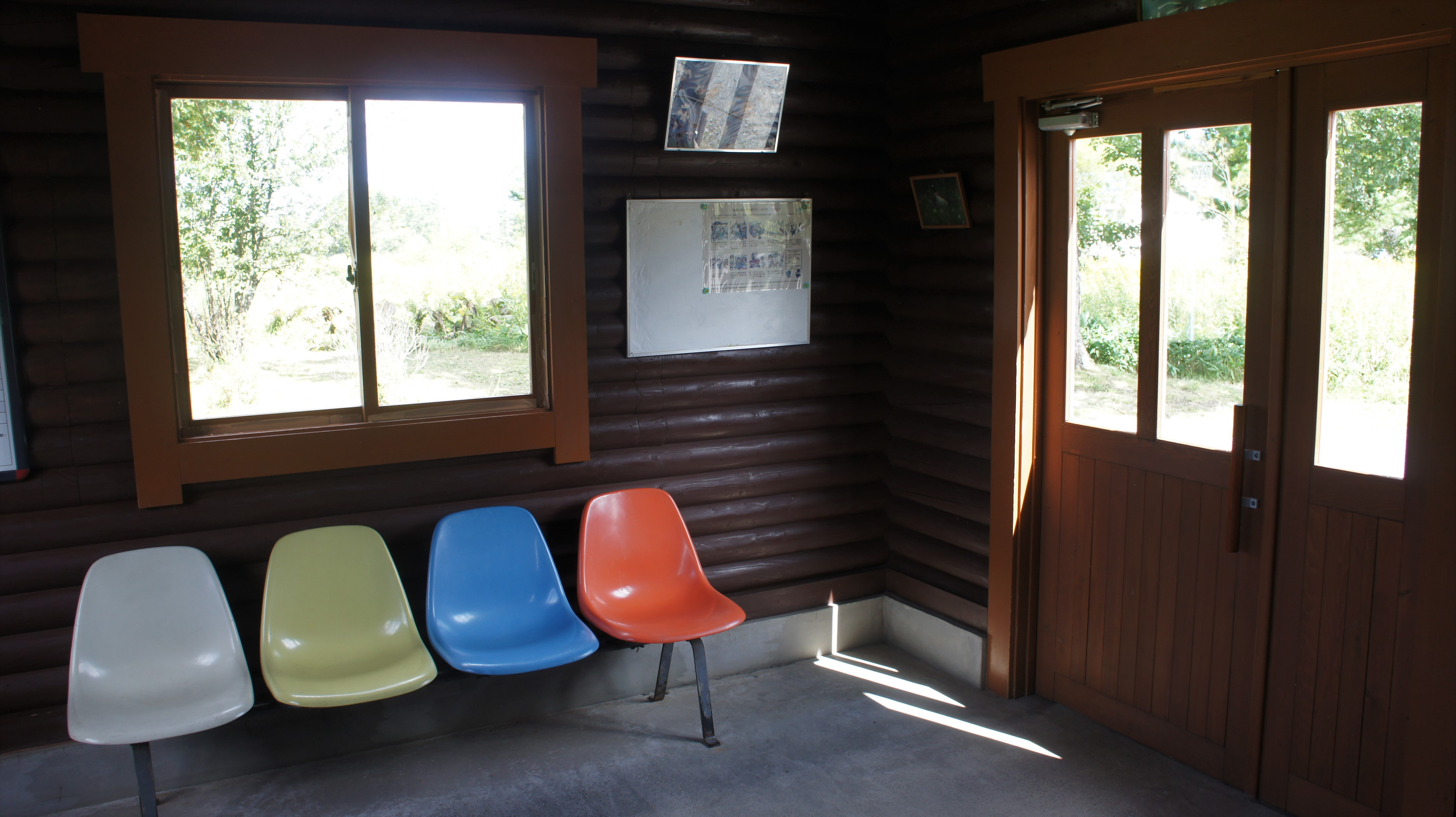
Waiting Room

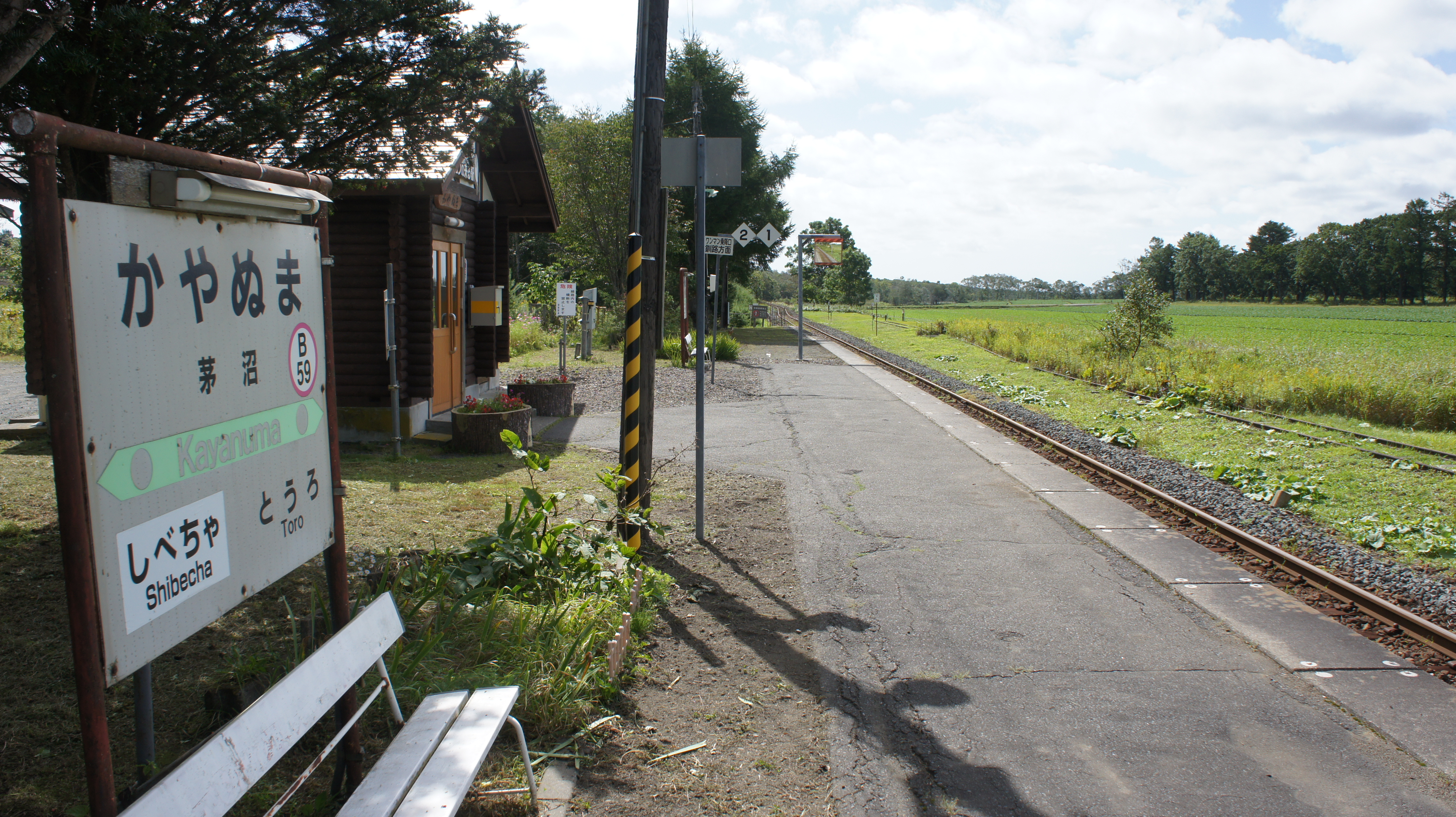
Platform

== History ==
The station opened on 15 September 1927 with the opening of the Ministry of Railways Senmō Main Line between Kushiro Station and Shibecha Station. Following the privatization of the Japanese National Railways on 1 April 1987, the station came under the control of JR Hokkaido. The current station building was reconstructed in 1989.

In June 2023, this station was selected to be among 42 stations on the JR Hokkaido network to be slated for abolition owing to low ridership according to a press release from Hokkaido Shinbun. However, Shibecha wasn't informed of this plan. 3 days after the news, a JR Hokkaido employee visited the town hall and informed the town that they had no plans to close the station.

== Passenger statistics ==
In fiscal 2022, the station was used by an average of 2 passengers daily.

== Surrounding area ==
- Kushiro Wetlands
- Kayanuma Onsen

== See also ==
- List of railway stations in Japan
