= Abashiri (disambiguation) =

Abashiri is a Japanese city.

Abashiri may also refer to:

- Abashiri District, Hokkaido
- Abashiri Station
