= Minami-Shari Station =

Railway station in Shari, Hokkaido, Japan

Coordinates: 43.8677°N 144.6343°E

Minami-Shari Station 南斜里駅
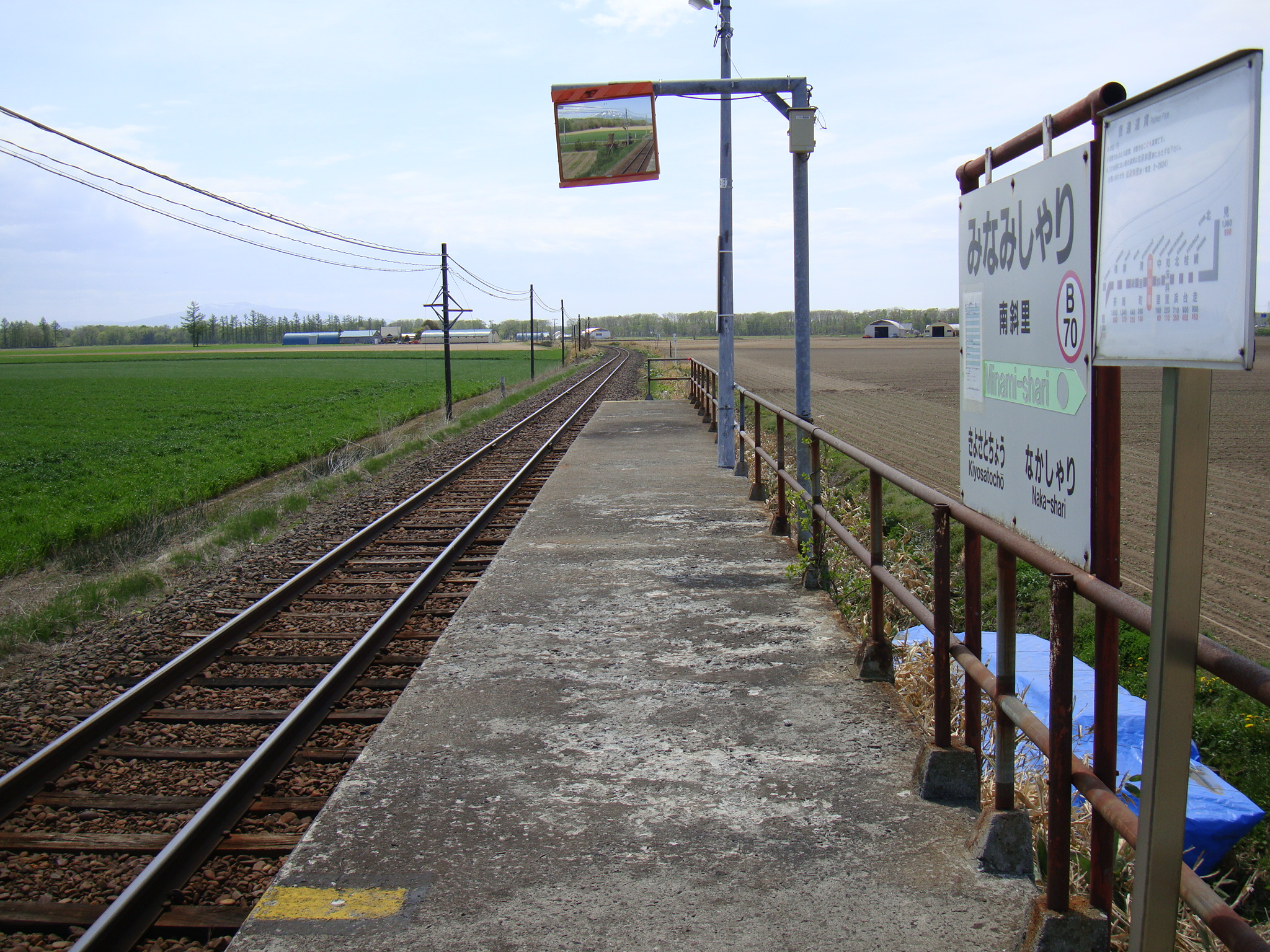
- Minami-Shari Station platform

General information
- Location: Kawakami, Shari, Hokkaido; Japan
- Operator: Hokkaido Railway Company
- Line: ■ Senmō Main Line
- Distance: 44.1 km from Abashiri
- Platforms: 1 Side platform

Other information
- Status: Unstaffed
- Station code: B-70

History
- Opened: 1 October 1962
- Closed: 13 March 2021

Passengers
- 2012: 2 daily
Location
- Location within Hokkaido Location within Japan

Minami-Shari Station (南斜里駅, Minami-Shari-eki) was a railway station, closed on 13 March 2021, on the Senmō Main Line in Shari, Hokkaido, Japan, operated by Hokkaido Railway Company (JR Hokkaido).

== Lines ==
Minami-Shari Station was served by the Senmō Main Line, and was numbered "B70".

== Adjacent stations ==
«	Service	»
Senmō Main Line
Rapid Shiretoko: Does not stop at this station
Naka-Shari	Local	Kiyosatochō

== History ==
The station opened on 1 October 1962. With the privatization of Japanese National Railways (JNR) on 1 April 1987, the station came under the control of JR Hokkaido. The station discontinued on 13 March 2021.

== See also ==
- List of railway stations in Japan
