= Katsuradai Station =

Railway station in Abashiri, Hokkaido, Japan

Coordinates: 44.0168°N 144.2731°E

Katsuradai Station 桂台駅
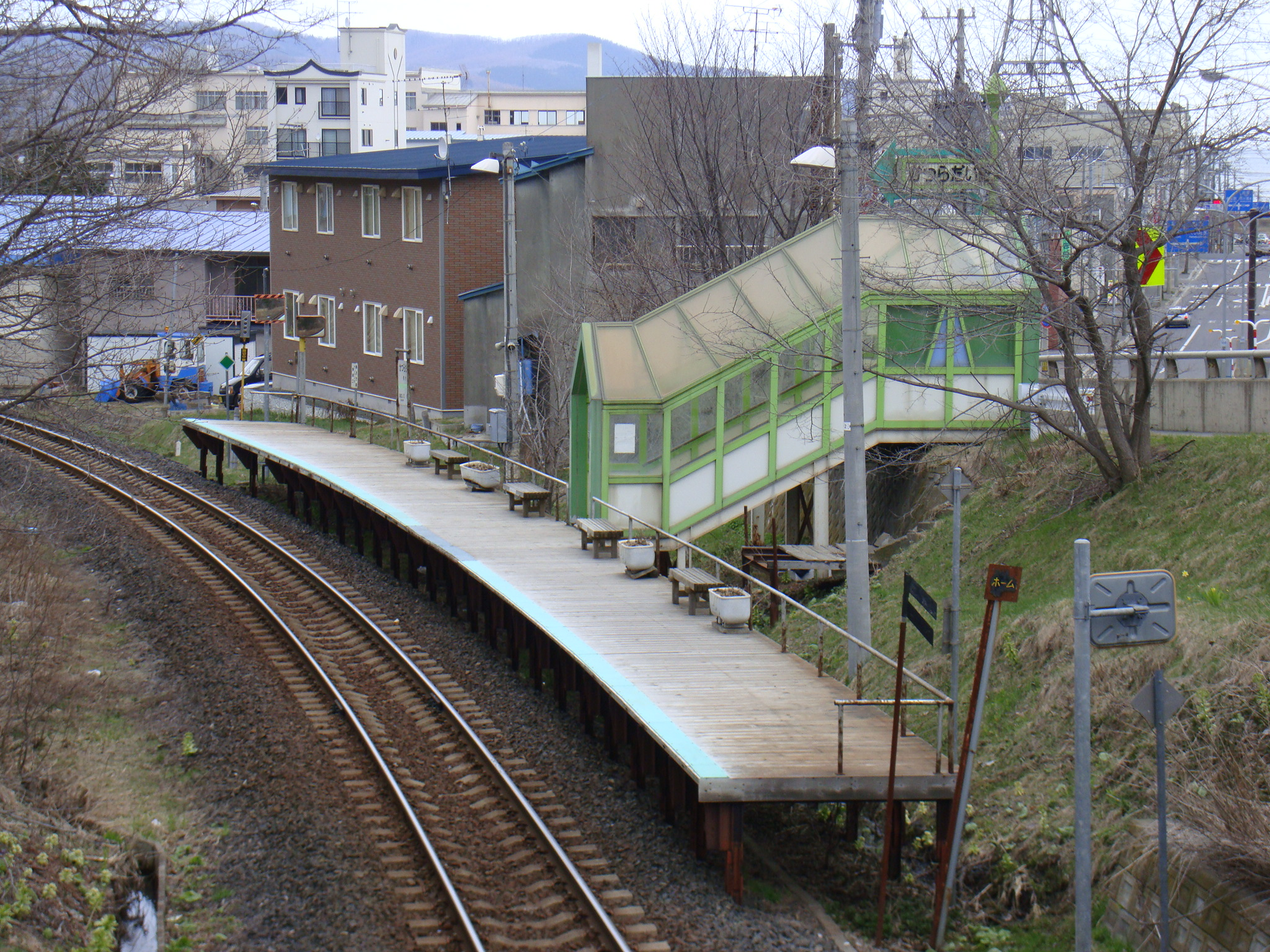
- Katsuradai Station platform

General information
- Location: 3 Chome Minami 10 Jōhigashi, Abashiri, Hokkaido; Japan
- Operator: Hokkaido Railway Company
- Line: Senmō Main Line
- Platforms: Side platform

Other information
- Station code: B-79

History
- Opened: 1967
Location

Katsuradai Station (桂台駅, Katsuradai-eki) is a train station in Abashiri, Hokkaidō, Japan.

== Lines ==
- Hokkaido Railway Company
  - Senmō Main Line Station B79

== Adjacent stations ==
«	Service	»
Senmō Main Line
Rapid Shiretoko: Does not stop at this station
Abashiri	Local	Masuura
