= Mashū Station =

Railway station in Teshikaga, Hokkaido, Japan

B64 Mashū Station 摩周駅
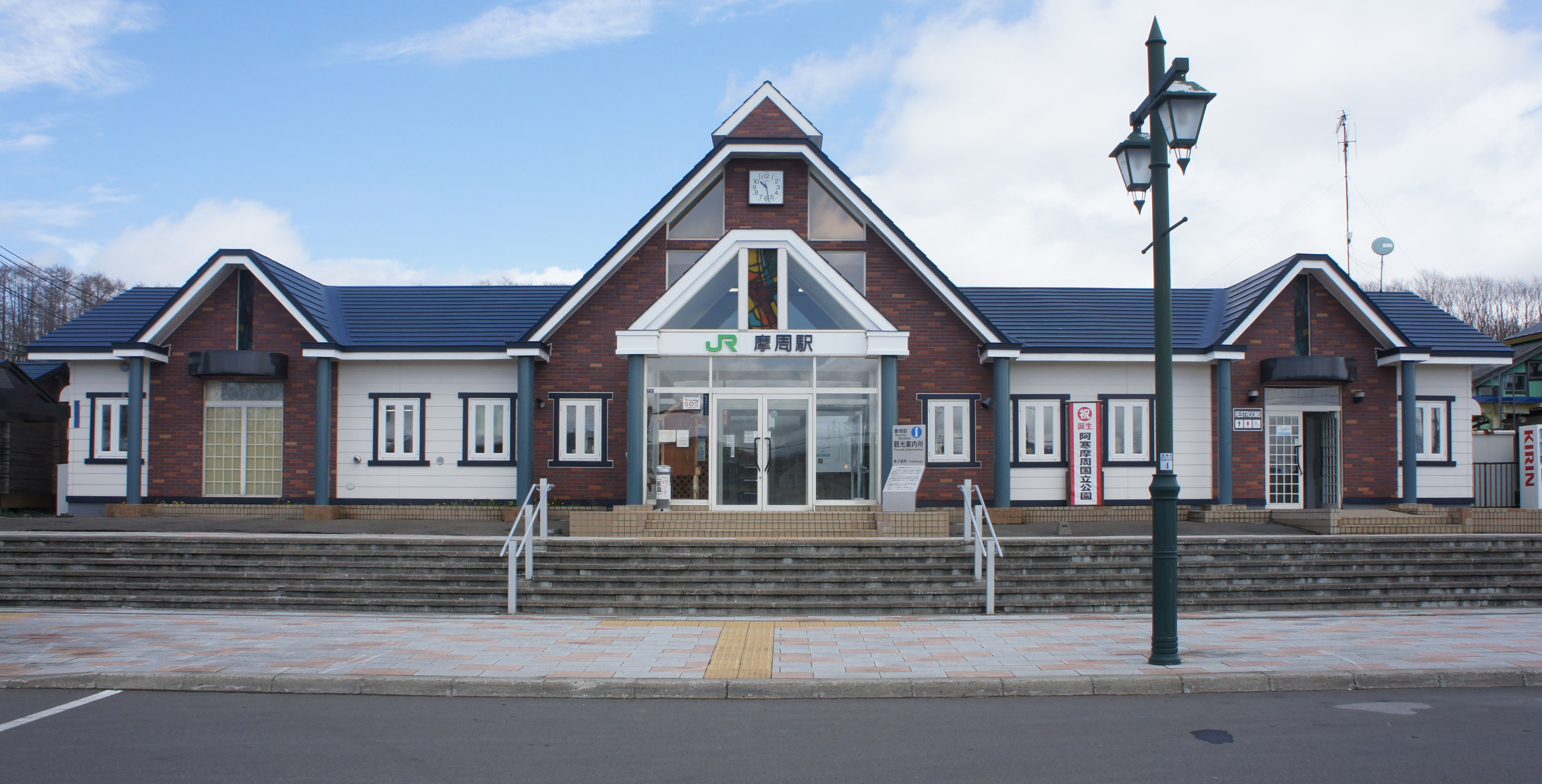
- Station building in May 2018

General information
- Location: 1-chōme-7 Asahi, Teshikaga, Kawakami District, Hokkaido 088-3204; Japan
- Coordinates: 43°22′46.15″N 144°33′15.7″E
- System: regional rail
- Operator: JR Hokkaido
- Line: Senmō Main Line
- Distance: 79.5 km from Higashi-Kushiro
- Platforms: 1 side + 1 island platforms
- Tracks: 3

Other information
- Status: Staffed (Midori no Madoguchi)
- Station code: B64
- Website: Official website

History
- Opened: 15 August 1929; 97 years ago
- Former names: Teshikaga (until 1990)

Passengers
- FY2022: 50 daily

Services
Preceding station	JR Hokkaido	Following station
Biruwa towards Abashiri	Senmō Main Line Local	Isobunnai towards Kushiro
Location
- Location within Hokkaido Location within Japan

Mashū Station (摩周駅, Mashū-eki) is a railway station located in the town of Teshikaga, Hokkaidō, Japan. It is operated by JR Hokkaido. The station was the setting for the 1991 film Deer Friend.

== Lines ==
The station is served by the Senmō Main Line, and lies 70.5 km from the starting point of the line at Higashi-Kushiro .

== Layout ==
Mashū Station has one side platform and one island platform serving three tracks. It previously had a freight platform and numerous sidings. Access between platforms is via a footbridge. The station is staffed and has a Midori no Madoguchi ticket office.The current station building was rebuilt in 1990.

=== Platforms ===
1	■ Senmō Main Line	for Abashiri
2, 3	■ Senmō Main Line	forKushiro

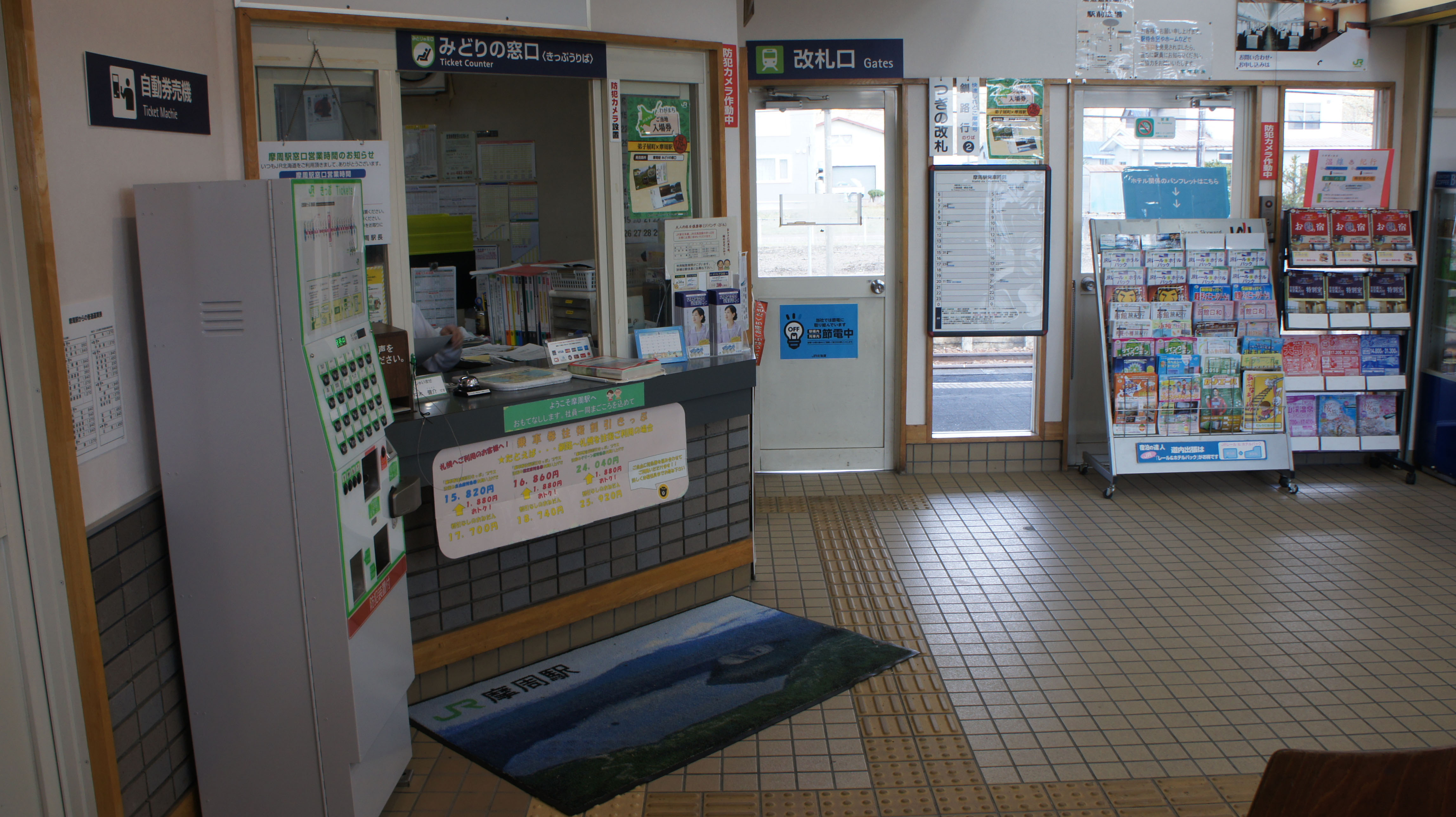
Ticket window

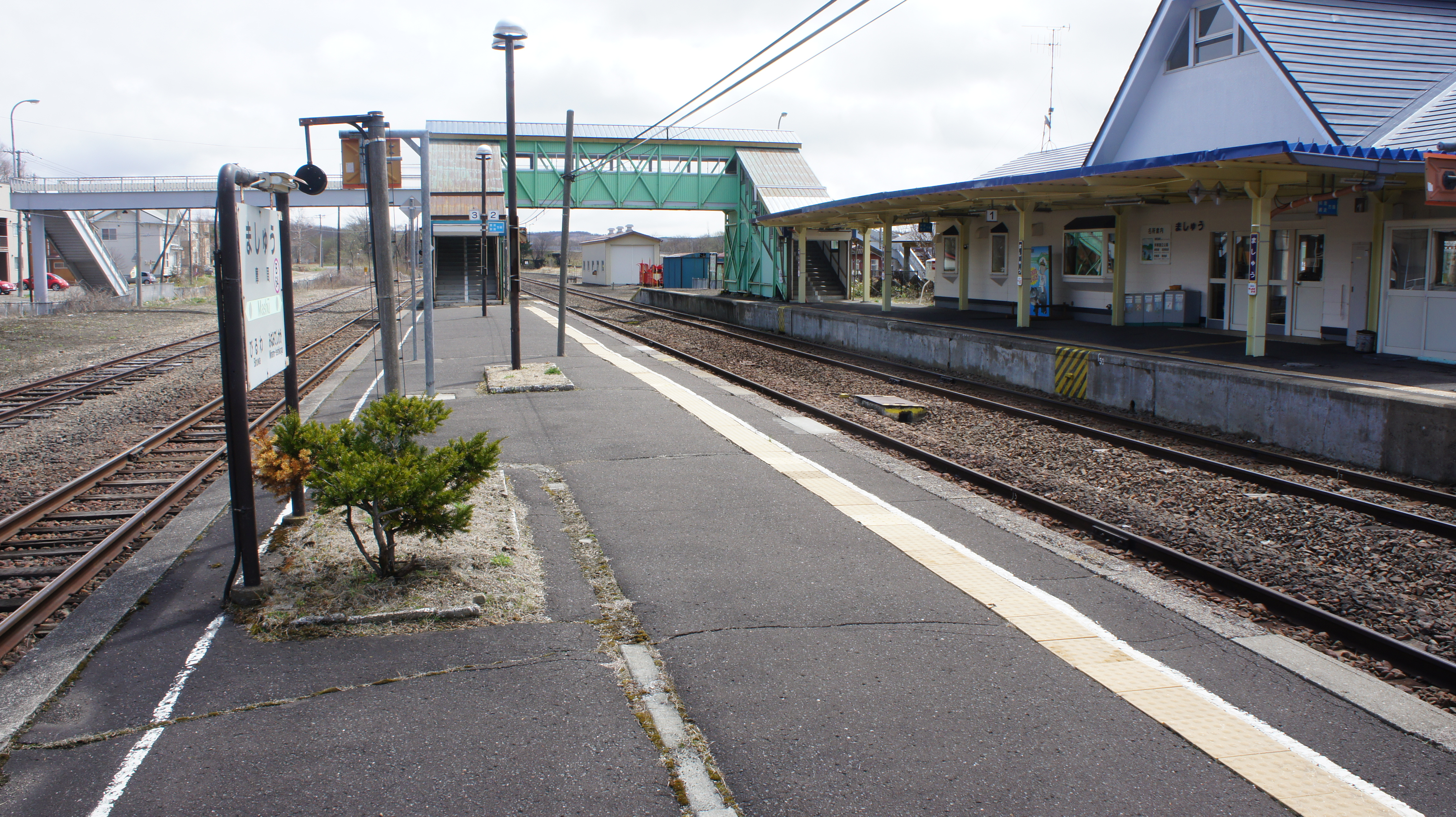
Platform

== History ==
The station opened on 15 August 1929 as Teshikaga Station (弟子屈駅) with the opening of the Ministry of Railways Senmō Main Line between Shibecha Station and Teshikaga Station. Following the privatization of the Japanese National Railways on 1 April 1987, the station came under the control of JR Hokkaido. The station was renamed to its present name on 20 November 1990.

== Passenger statistics ==
In fiscal 2022, the station was used by an average of 50 passengers daily.

== Surrounding area ==
Mashū Station is the central station of Teshikaga Town, and its streets are lined with shops. A monument inspired by Lake Mashū stands in the center of the station plaza, illuminated in "Lake Mashū Blue" during summer nights. Next to the station is a foot bath with natural hot spring water, and the station building itself has potable hot spring water.

- Hokkaido Highway Route 717, Sapporo-Teshikaga Station Line,
- Hokkaido Highway Route 53, Kushiro-Tsurui-Teshikaga Line
- Japan National Route 243
- Japan National Route 241
- Japan National Route 391
- Mashū Onsen Roadside Station
- Teshikaga Town Hall

== See also ==
- List of railway stations in Japan
