= Shibecha Station =

Railway station in Shibecha, Hokkaido, Japan

B61 Shibecha Station 標茶駅
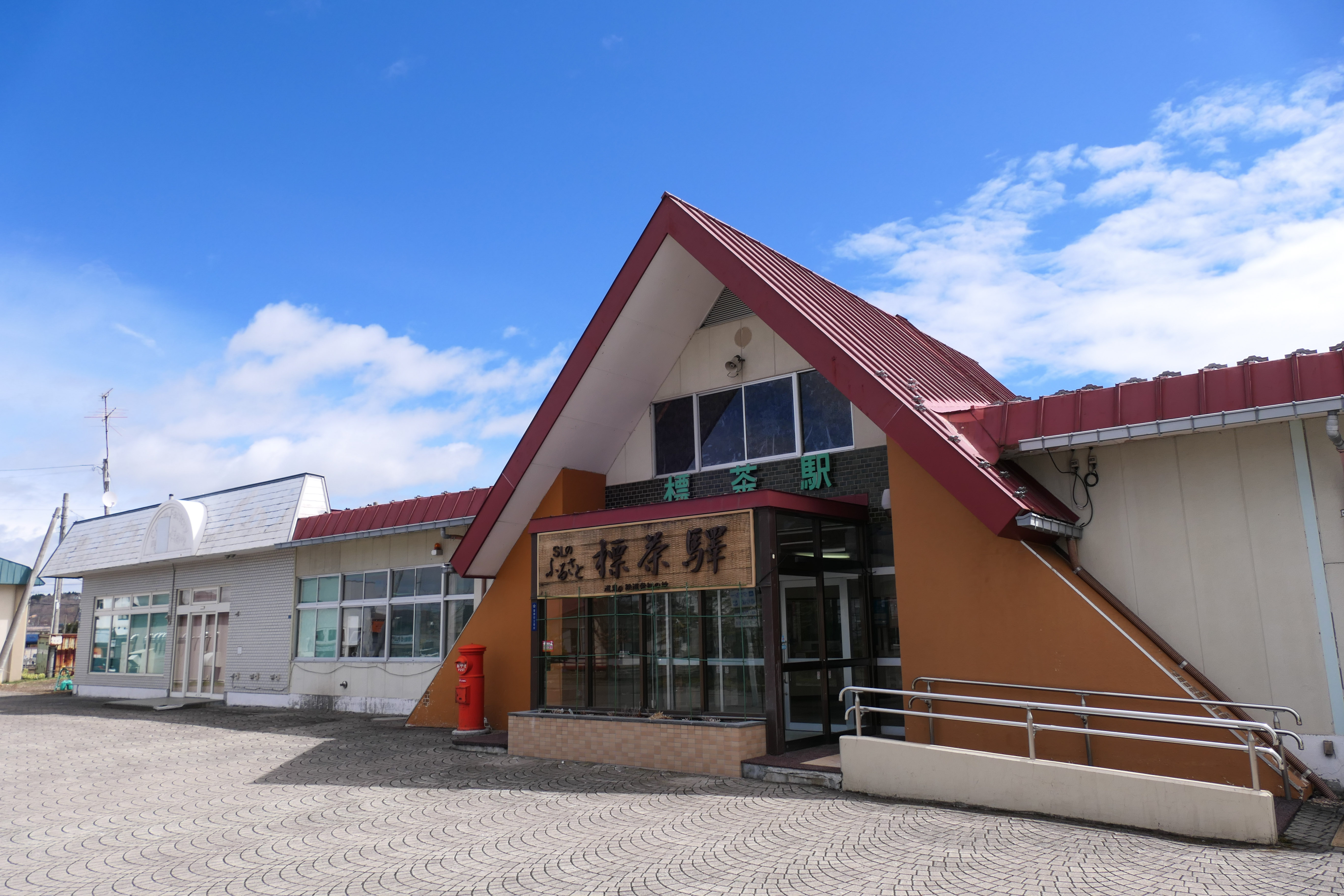
- Station building in May 2021

General information
- Location: 1-chōme-1 Asahi, Shibecha, Kawakami District, Hokkaido 088-2301; Japan
- Coordinates: 43°17′54.31″N 144°36′30.29″E
- System: regional rail
- Operator: JR Hokkaido
- Line: Senmō Main Line
- Distance: 45.2 km from Higashi-Kushiro
- Platforms: 1 side + 1 island platform
- Tracks: 3

Other information
- Status: Staffed
- Station code: B61
- Website: Official website

History
- Opened: 15 September 1927; 99 years ago

Passengers
- FY2022: 99 daily

Services
Preceding station	JR Hokkaido	Following station
Isobunnai towards Abashiri	Senmō Main Line Local	Kayanuma towards Kushiro
Location
- Location within Hokkaido Location within Japan

Shibecha Station (標茶駅, Shibecha-eki) is a railway station located in the town of Shibecha, Hokkaidō, Japan. It is operated by JR Hokkaido.

== Lines ==
The station is served by the Senmō Main Line, and lies 45.2 km from the starting point of the line at Higashi-Kushiro .

== Layout ==
Shibecha Station has one side platform and one island platform; however platform 3 is unused. The station previously had a secondary track, a freight platform, and numerous sidings. Access between platforms is via a footbridge. The station is attended and has a Midori no Madoguchi ticket office.

=== Platforms ===
1	■ Senmō Main Line	for Mashū and Abashiri
2	■ Senmō Main Line	for Kushiro
3	■ Senmō Main Line	<not in normal operation>

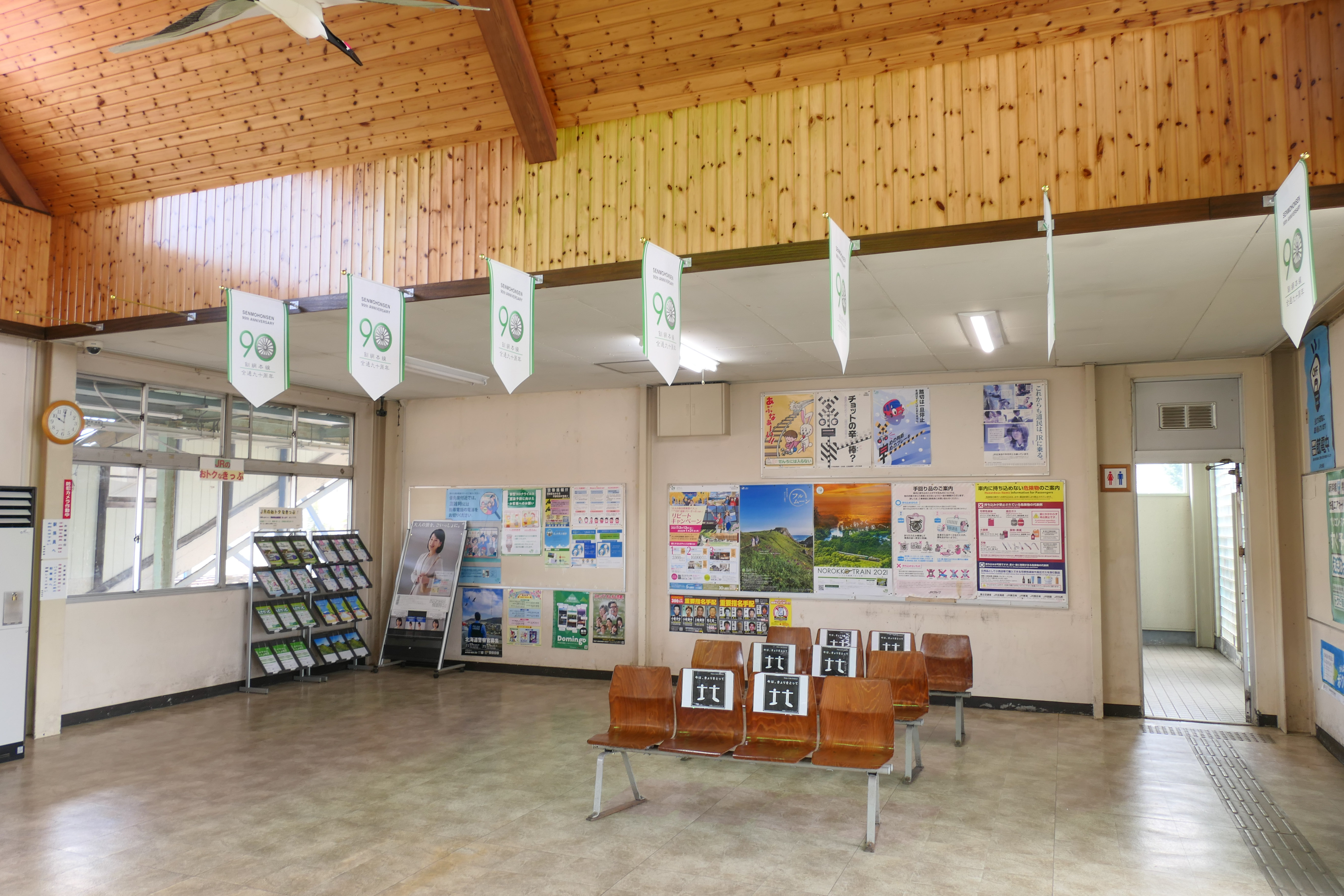
Waiting Room

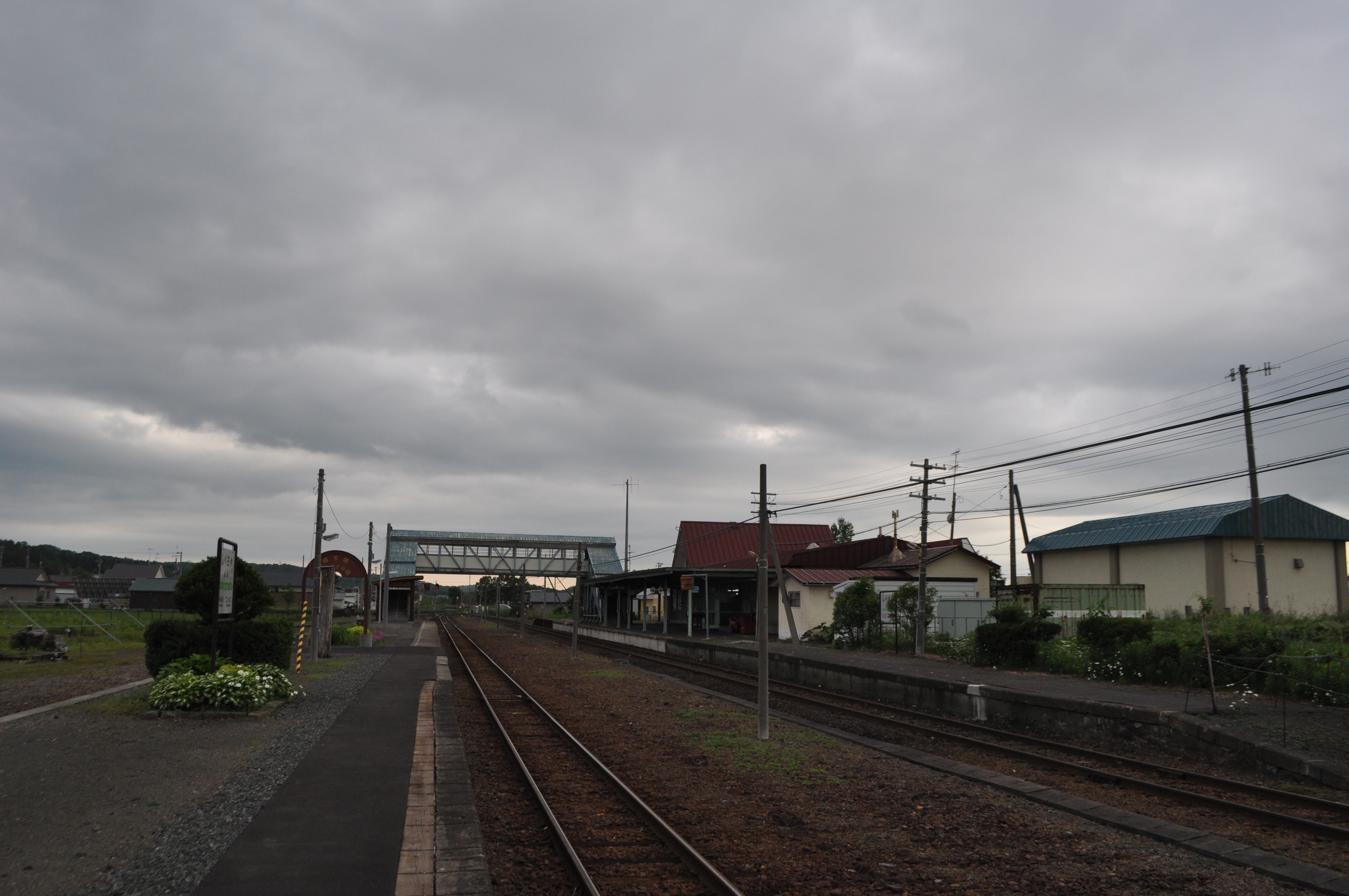
Platform

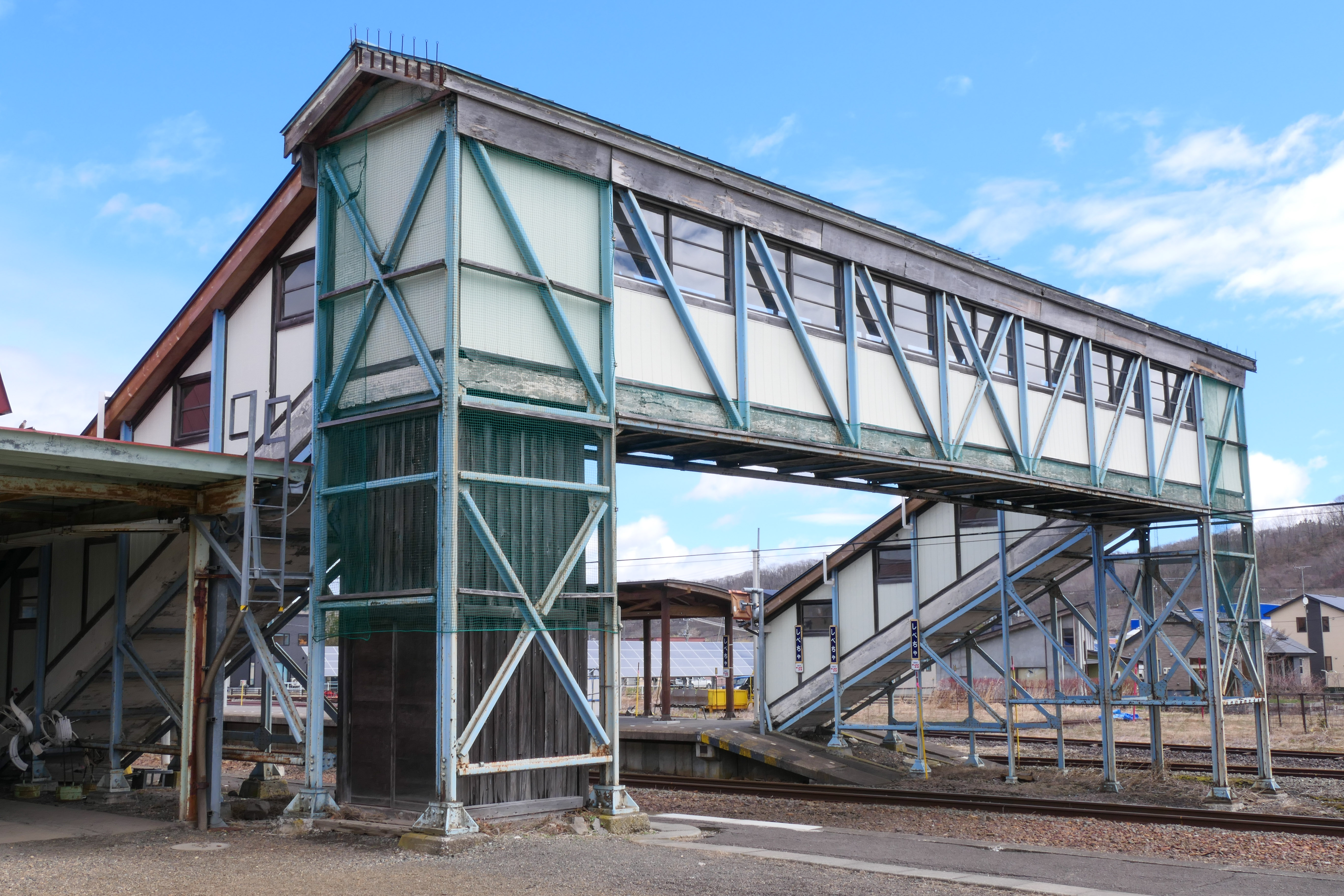
Footbridge

== History ==
The station opened on 15 September 1927 with the opening of the Ministry of Railways Senmō Main Line between Kushiro Station and Shibecha Station. The 69.4 kilometer Shibetsu Line to Nemuro-Shibetsu Station operated from this station from 29 October 1936 to its abolition on 30 April 1989. The current station building was reconstructed in 1974. Following the privatization of the Japanese National Railways on 1 April 1987, the station came under the control of JR Hokkaido. The current station building was reconstructed in 1988.

== Passenger statistics ==
In fiscal 2022, the station was used by an average of 99 passengers daily.

== Surrounding area ==
- Japan National Route 391
- Japan National Route 274
- Shibecha Town Hall

== See also ==
- List of railway stations in Japan
