= Deer Friend =

- Film poster
- Directed by: Yukihiro Sawada
- Screenplay by: Takahisa Katsume; Yukihiro Sawada
- Produced by: Masao Wakamatsu; Yoshiteru Yuki
- Starring: Teppei Yamada; Tomokazu Miura; Midori Kanazawa; Takuzo Kawatani
- Cinematography: Akira Shiizuka
- Edited by: Akira Suzuki
- Music by: Joe Hisaishi
- Production companies: Kojika Monogatari Film; Nikkatsu
- Distributed by: Toho
- Release date: April 20, 1991 (Japan)
- Running time: 110 minutes
- Country: Japan
- Language: Japanese

Deer Friend (Japanese: 仔鹿物語, Hepburn: Kojika monogatari), also known as Fawn Story or The Tale of the Deer, is a 1991 Japanese film co-written and directed by Yukihiro Sawada. It was released in Japan on April 20, 1991, where it was distributed by Toho.

The film won Tomokazu Miura the award for Best Supporting Actor at the Mainichi Film Concours. Miura also won for his roles in Nowhere Man and The Great Shogunate Battle. At the Japanese Academy Awards, Joe Hisaishi won the award for Best Score, for this along with three other films he scored in 1991.

== Plot ==
Eight-year-old Kenichi Taniki (Teppei Yamada) and his family live next to the Shibecha Line, in a small village near the Kushiro Marshlands. Kenichi's father Masao (Tomokazu Miura) is a train driver, but the rail line will be closed by autumn. After finding a new job at an insurance company in Sapporo, Masao plans a move for his family. Meanwhile, Kenichi's farmer grandparents are very old and will pass away soon. But due to the family's impending move, no one will be left to take over their farm.

One day, Kenichi discovers a fawn and its mother in the forest. Kenichi accidentally spooks the mother, who runs in front of a car and dies. The children of the village learned to love nature from local forest ranger Mr. Oriya (Takuzo Kawatani). This, along with his guilt, leads Kenichi to take care of the fawn. He hides the animal in a disused train station and names it "Lucky".

At first, the fawn doesn't want to drink milk. Kenichi cautiously questions Mr. Oriya on how to feed baby animals. He believes that if Mr. Oriya finds out about Lucky, he will inform the authorities. Mr. Oriya tells Kenichi that mother's milk contains a substance which newborns need for sustenance. Ultimately, Kenichi takes milk from a cow that has just given birth to a calf. Lucky happily drinks the milk.

Kenichi manages to raise Lucky on his own despite mishaps (such as Lucky eating a farmer's crops), until he accidentally sets fire to the station. He is discovered, but Mr. Oriya clears everything up. Oriya had seen through Kenichi and already informed the authorities, who allow Kenichi to raise the fawn.

Now raising Lucky without secrecy, Kenichi enlists his friends to help out. However, Lucky soon falls ill, and everyone worries about its health. The children's elementary school teacher Haruko (Mayumi Wakamura) even gives them the day off so they can look after the animal. Eventually, Lucky is nursed back to full health.

As autumn approaches, Lucky longs to return to his herd in the forest. Kenichi learns to let Lucky go and says a heartfelt goodbye. Afterwards, the family sets off for Sapporo. However, Kenichi's father finally notices that his family is unhappy with the move. In the end, he turns back and takes over the grandparents' farm.

== Cast ==
- Teppei Yamada as Kenichi Taniki
- Tomokazu Miura as Masao Taniki
- Midori Kanazawa as Eiko Taniki
- Takuzo Kadono as Akihiko Taniki
- Shuuko Honami as Tomoko Taniki
- Fumiko Onishi as Sayaka Taniki
- Yoshiko Miyazaki as Yoshimi Sakaguchi
- Kaku Takashina as Yoshio Sakaguchi
- Takuzo Kawatani as Taro Oriya
- Mayumi Wakamura as Teacher Haruko
- Guts Ishimatsu as Komai
- Kazuya Kosaka as Director Sugawa
- Kin Sugai as Kana Osaki
- Ryosuke Miki as Shigeru Okabe
- Hanae Shoji as Sakie
- Akiko Kazami as Rie Sakaguchi
- Mitsuji Kojima as Senior veterinarian
- Tonpei Hidari as Resident
- Masumi Harukawa as Woman in front of the station
- Toru Nakane
- Hiroaki Iiyama
- Kiyoshi Yamamoto
- Kenichi Yagi

== Production ==
Filming took place mainly in Kushiro, Shibecha, Shibetsu and Betsukai in Hokkaido. It took over a year to shoot the changing of the seasons and the growth of Lucky and Kenichi. Cinematographer Akira Shiizuka was a specialist in animal photography who shot several animal-related films, including the 1983 blockbuster Antarctica. Editor Akira Suzuki had also worked on Antarctica.

The Shibecha Line in the film is based on the Shibetsu Line and Shibetsu Station, which operated until 1989. The train scenes were shot on the Senmō Main Line, and Tōro Station served as the fictional, defunct terminal where Kenichi hides Lucky.

== Home media ==
In 1993, a German-dubbed VHS was released in Germany, under the title Flecki, My Friend (Flecki, Mein Freund). This version was made available on German DVD in 2003.

== See also ==
- The Yearling, a 1983 anime adaptation of the book of the same name
- The Yearling, a 1946 film adaptation of the book of the same name
- The Yearling, a 1994 remake of the 1946 adaptation
- D.W.'s Deer Friend, a 1998 TV episode
- List of Japanese films of 1991

== Footnotes ==
=== References ===
- Galbraith IV, Stuart (2008). The Toho Studios Story: A History and Complete Filmography. Scarecrow Press. ISBN 978-1461673743.
