= Senmō Main Line =

Railway line in Hokkaido, Japan

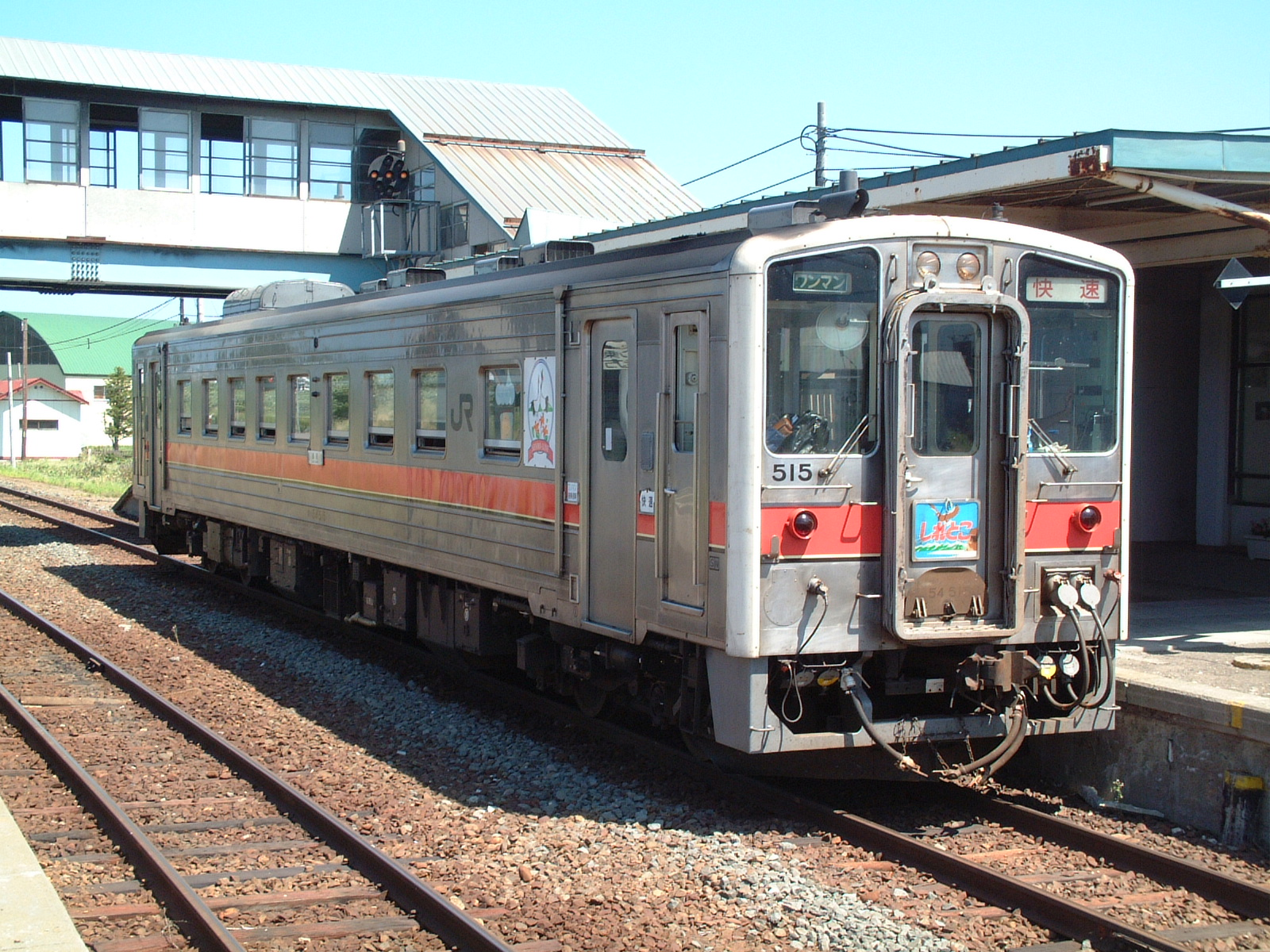
- Senmō Main Line Shiretoko rapid train

Overview
- Native name: 釧網本線
- Status: Operational
- Owner: JR Hokkaido
- Locale: Hokkaido, Japan
- Termini: Abashiri; Kushiro
- Stations: 23

Service
- Type: Heavy rail
- Operator(s): Hokkaido Railway Company
- Rolling stock: H100 series DEMUs

History
- Opened: 1924; 102 years ago

Technical
- Line length: 166.2 km (103.3 mi)
- Number of tracks: Entire line single tracked
- Character: Rural
- Track gauge: 1,067 mm (3 ft 6 in)
- Electrification: None
- Operating speed: 80 km/h (50 mph)
Route map

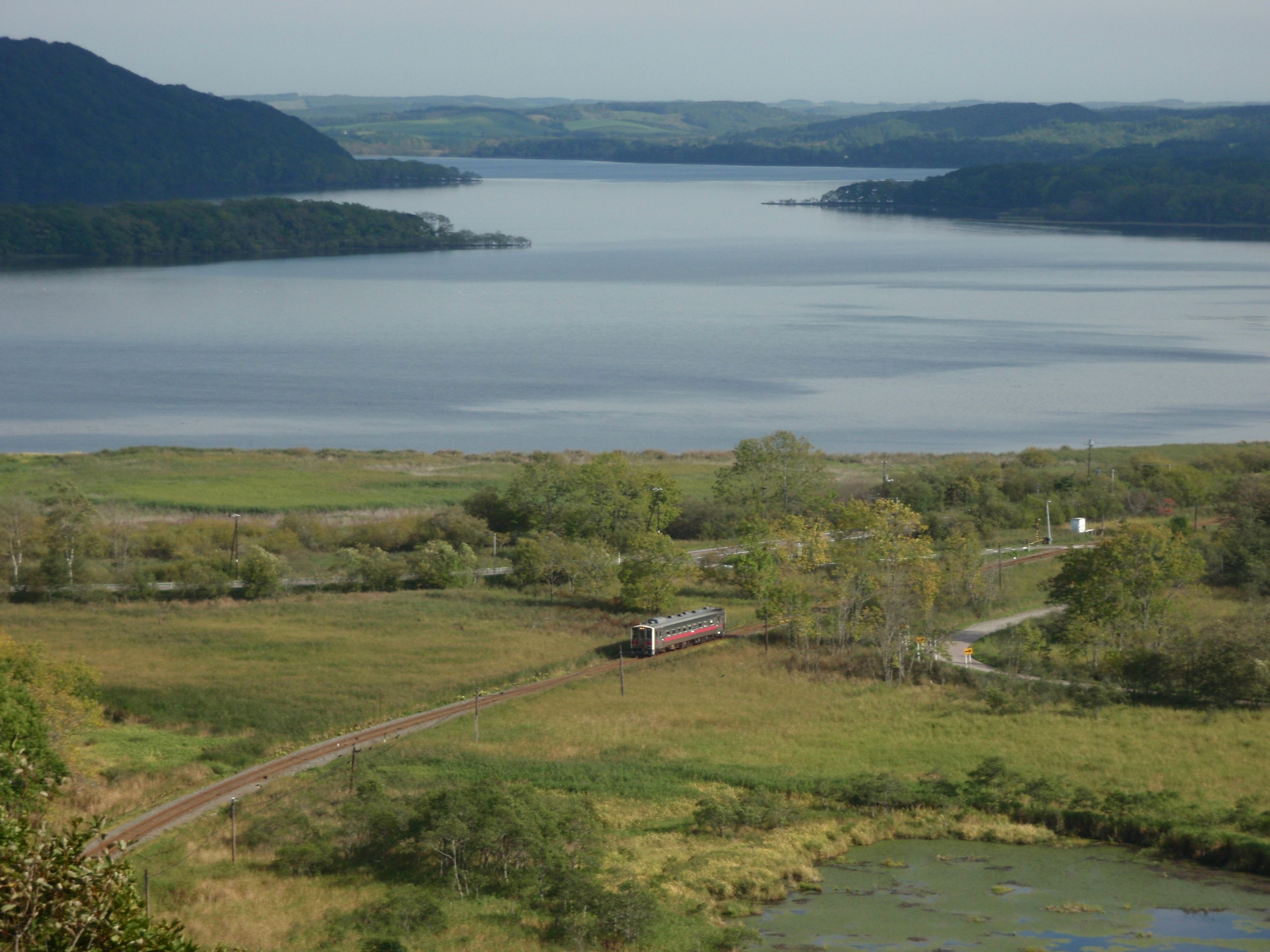
Senmo line near Lake Tōro

The Senmō Main Line (釧網本線, Senmō-honsen) is a Japanese railway line in Hokkaido, operated by Hokkaido Railway Company (JR Hokkaido), between Higashi-Kushiro Station in Kushiro and Abashiri Station in Abashiri. The name comes from Kushiro (釧路) and Abashiri (網走). In 2008, a dual-mode vehicle was tested on parts of the line.

On 19 November 2016, JR Hokkaido's President announced plans to rationalize its network by up to 1,237 km, or ~50% of the current network, including the proposed conversion of the Senmo Main Line to third-sector operation; if local governments are not agreeable, the line may face closure.

== Stations ==
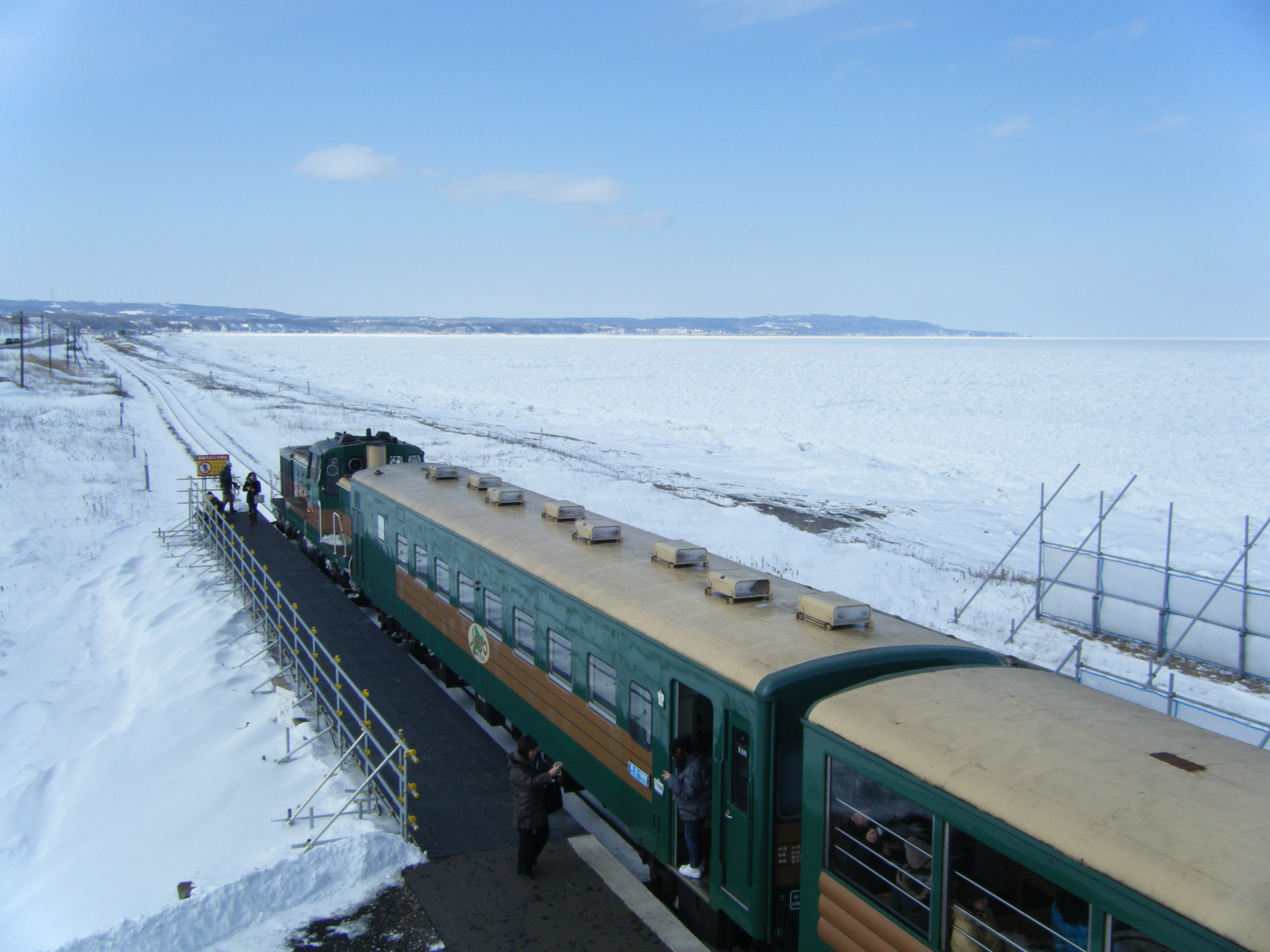
Kitahama Station in winter

No.	Station		Distance (km)	Transfers / Notes	Location (All in Hokkaido)
A69	Abashiri	網走	0.0	■ Sekihoku Main Line ■ ~~Yūmō Line~~ (Closed 1987)	Abashiri
B79	Katsuradai	桂台	1.4		Abashiri
B78	Masuura	鱒浦	6.2		Abashiri
B77	Mokoto	藻琴	8.7		Abashiri
B76	Kitahama	北浜	11.5		Abashiri
B75	Genseikaen (Seasonal operation)	原生花園	16.9		Koshimizu
B74	Hama-Koshimizu	浜小清水	20.1		Koshimizu
B73	Yamubetsu	止別	25.8		Koshimizu
B72	Shiretoko-Shari	知床斜里	37.3	■ ~~K~~~~ompoku Line~~ (Closed 1970)	Shari
B71	Naka-Shari	中斜里	41.9		Shari
B70	~~Minami-Shari~~	~~南斜里~~	44.1	Closed 13 March 2021	Shari
B69	Kiyosatochō	清里町	49.2		Kiyosato
B68	Sattsuru	札弦	57.0		Kiyosato
B67	Midori	緑	65.3		Kiyosato
B66	Kawayu-Onsen	川湯温泉	79.8		Teshikaga
B65	Biruwa	美留和	87.0		Teshikaga
B64	Mashū	摩周	95.7		Teshikaga
B63	~~Minami-Teshikaga~~	~~南弟子屈~~	103.9	Closed 14 March 2020	Teshikaga
B62	Isobunnai	磯分内	110.4		Shibecha
B61	Shibecha	標茶	121.0	■ ~~S~~~~hibetsu Line~~ (Closed 1989)	Shibecha
B60	~~Gojikkoku~~	~~五十石~~	129.5	Closed 25 March 2016	Shibecha
B59	Kayanuma	茅沼	134.9		Shibecha
B58	Tōro	塘路	141.9		Shibecha
B57	Hosooka	細岡	149.1	Seasonal Operations between April 25th to November 30th only.	Kushiro (town)
B56	Kushiro-Shitsugen	釧路湿原	151.5		Kushiro (town)
B55	Tōya	遠矢	158.8		Kushiro (town)
B54	Higashi-Kushiro	東釧路	166.2	■ Nemuro Main Line (for Nemuro)	Kushiro
Higashi-Kushiro to Kushiro: officially Nemuro Main Line
K53	Kushiro	釧路	169.1	■ Nemuro Main Line (for Obihiro)	Kushiro

=== Closed stations ===
- B60 Gojikkoku: since 4 March 2017
- B63 Minami-Teshikaga: since 14 March 2020
- B70 Minami-Shari: since 13 March 2021

== Service ==
Nearly all services on the line are Local services, which stop at every station. The Rapid Shiretoko train runs between Abashiri and Kushiro, with one daily return working.

As of 16 March 2024, all services are operated by the H100 series.

== History ==
In 1887 a private 41 km 1067mm gauge line was opened from a sulfur mine at Atsanobori to a refinery at Shibecha, 48 km north of Kushiro. Known as the Kushiro Railway, it closed 9 years later when the sulphur was mined out. 35 years after it closed the 17 km section of the Senmo line between Mashu - Shibecha was built on the formation of the Kushiro Railway.

Construction of the Senmo line started from both Asashiri and Kushiro, with the northern portion opening to Satsutsuru in sections between 1924 and 1929, and the southern portion opening in sections to Kawayu between 1927 and 1930. The Satsutsuru - Kawayu section opened in 1931, completing the line.

Freight services on the line ceased in 2002.

=== Former connecting lines ===
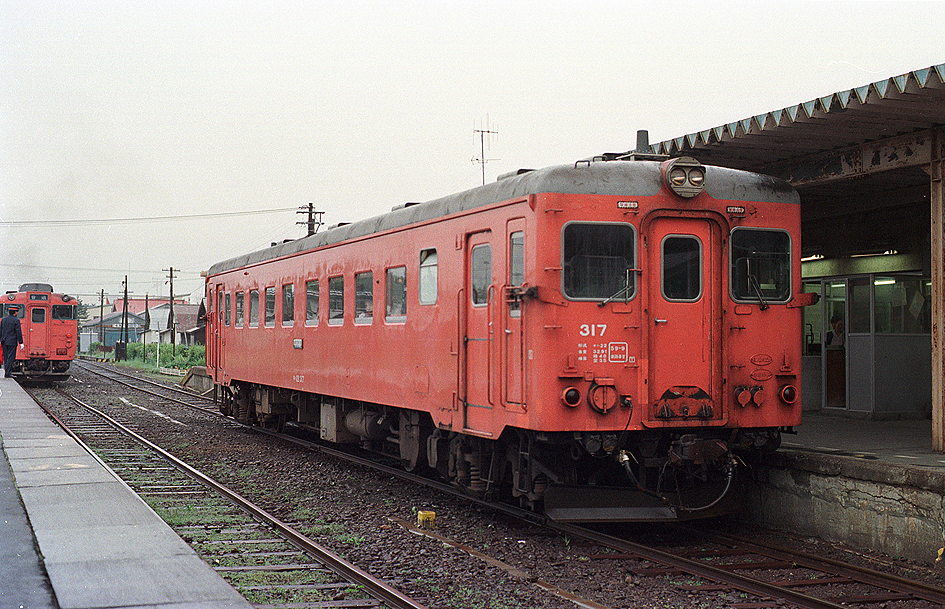
Nakashibetsu Station in 1986

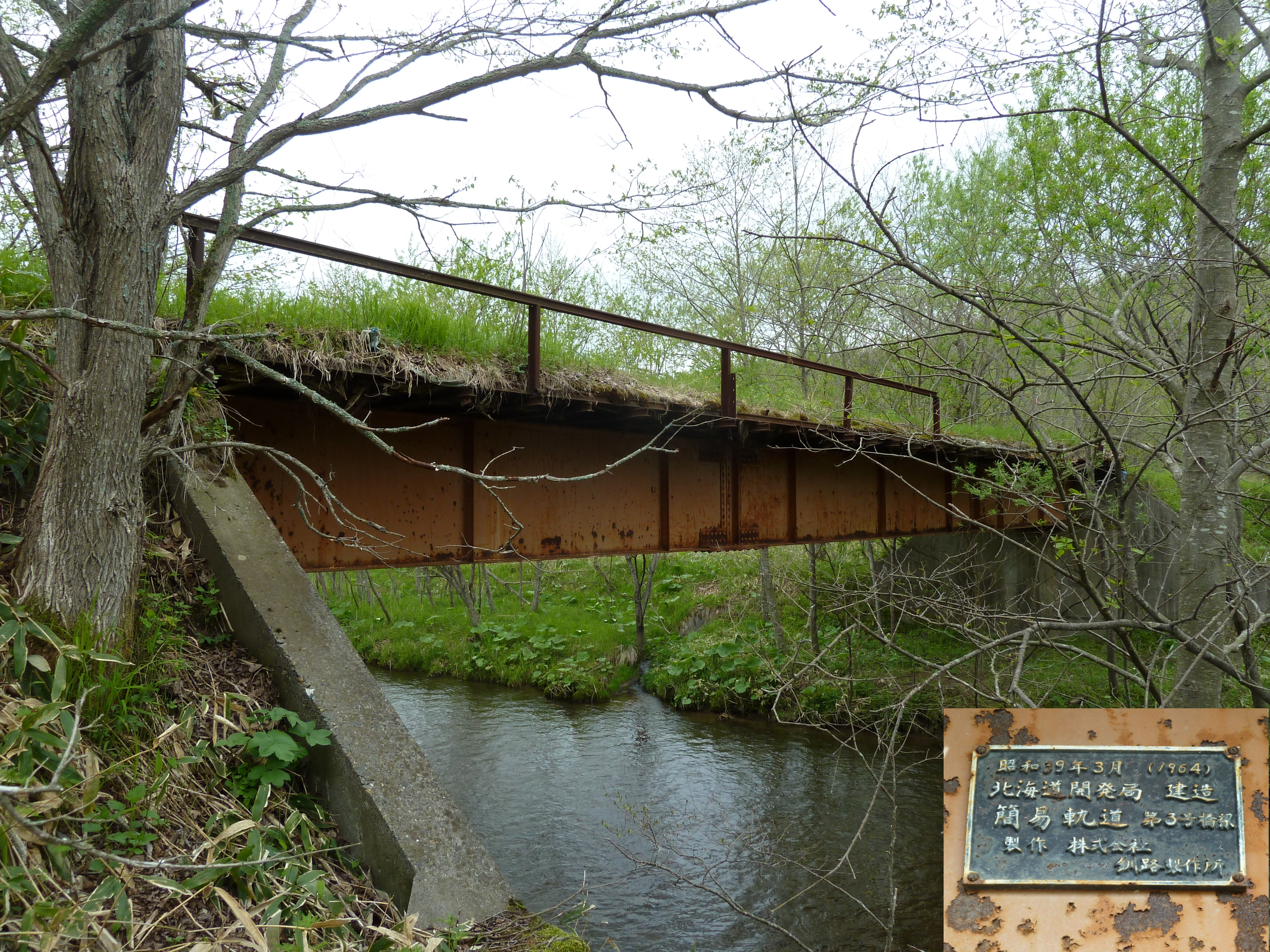
Bridge from the Shibecha development lines remaining 40 years after closure

- Abashiri Station - The Yumo Line to Nakayubetsu opened in sections between 1935 & 1952 and closed in 1987.
- Mokoto Station - A 762 mm (2 ft 6 in) gauge line operated to Yamazono (25 km) from 1935 to 1965. A 7 km branch line to Toyo Sawa operated from 1949 to 1962.
- Hamakoshimizu Station - Another 762 mm (2 ft 6 in) gauge line extended 18 km east to service the sugar beet industry between 1941 and 1953.
- Yamubetsu Station - A 1,067 mm (3 ft 6 in) private railway operated to Koshimizu (9 km) from 1930 to 1939.
- Shari Station - In 1938, fears of Russian naval activity resulted in the decision to build a line to Shibubetsu through the Konpokutoge Pass for defence purposes. Construction was suspended in 1941 following the Soviet–Japanese Neutrality Pact. Construction recommenced in 1957 to service forestry activity, but was suspended again when the highway was upgraded. The line was opened 12.8 km to Koshikawa, servicing the local community until closure in 1970. A substantial brick arch bridge was built south of Koshikawa before construction was abandoned.
- Shibecha Station;

- A 39 km 762 mm (2 ft 6 in) gauge line opened to Nakashibetsu in 1932. In 1936 it was replaced by a 1,067 mm (3 ft 6 in) line, which was extended 40 km to Shibetsu, operating until 1989. A branch from Nakashibetsu connected to the Nemuro Main Line at Attoko between 1933 and 1989, the two branches being known collectively as the Shibetsu Line. A total of 9 separate 762 mm (2 ft 6 in) gauge development lines connected to stations along the Shibetsu Line were built between 1930 and 1963, the last closing in 1971.

- Another 762 mm (2 ft 6 in) gauge system connected the Numahoro District to Shibecha, consisting of a 23 km 'main line' opened 1955, and a 6 km branch opened 1966. Both closed in 1971.

== See also ==
- List of railway lines in Japan
