= Higashi-Kushiro Station =

Railway station in Kushiro, Hokkaido, Japan

B54 Higashi-Kushiro Station 東釧路駅
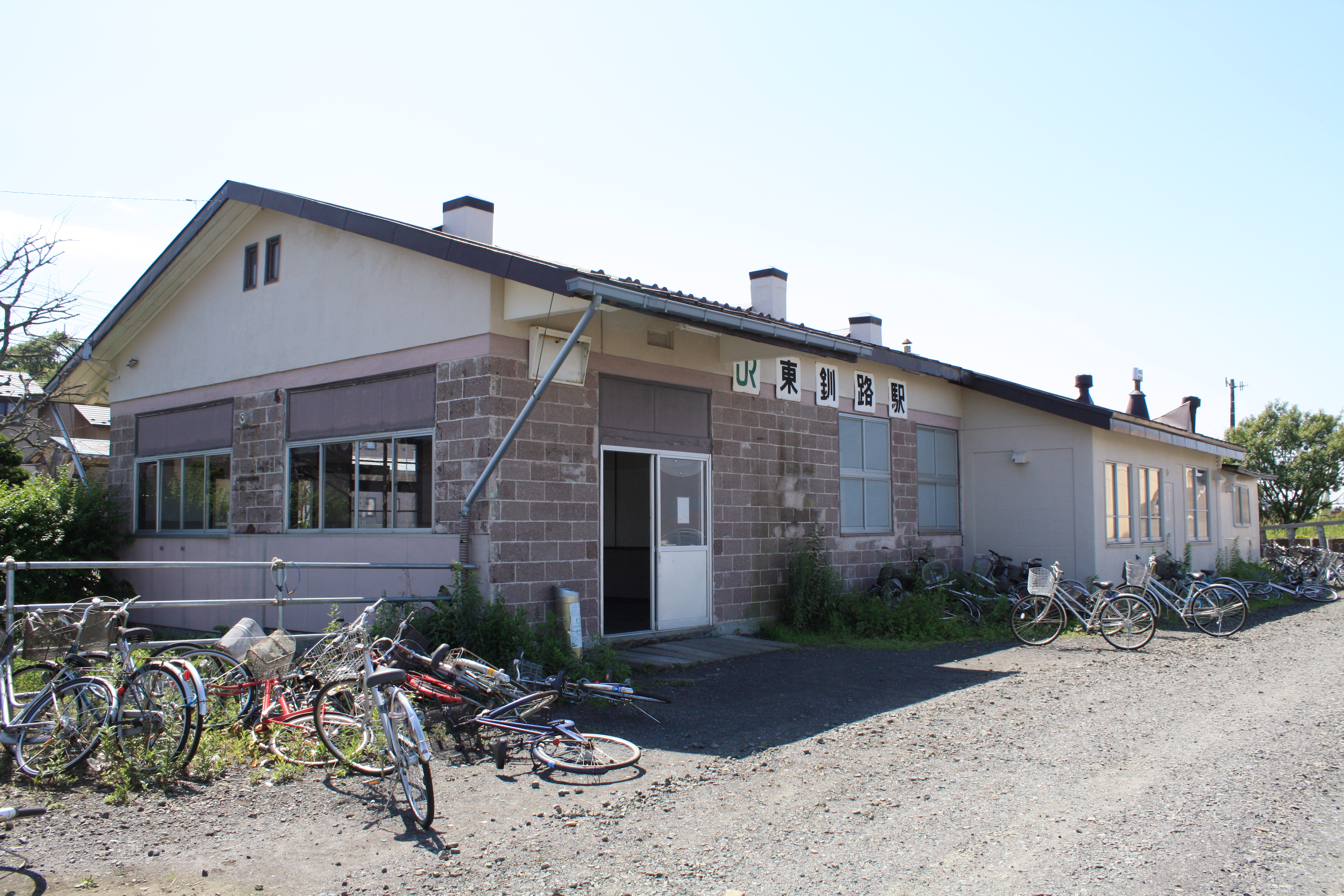
- Higashi-Kushiro Station station building

General information
- Location: 2-chōme-23 Kaizuka, Kushiro-shi, Hokkaido 085-0816; Japan
- Coordinates: 42°59′43.57″N 144°24′41.53″E
- System: regional rail
- Operator: JR Hokkaido
- Lines: Nemuro Main Line; Senmō Main Line
- Distance: 175.0 km from Shintoku
- Platforms: 1 island platform
- Tracks: 2

Other information
- Status: Unattended
- Station code: B54
- Website: Official website

History
- Opened: 16 March 1925; 101 years ago

Passengers
- FY2022: 131 daily

Services
Preceding station	JR Hokkaido	Following station
Kushiro towards Takikawa	Nemuro Main Line Local	Musa towards Nemuro
Tōya towards Abashiri	Senmō Main Line Local	Kushiro Terminus
Location
- Location within Hokkaido Location within Japan

Higashikushiro Station (東釧路駅, Higashikushiro-eki) is a railway station located in the city of Kushiro, Hokkaidō, Japan. It is operated by JR Hokkaido.

== Lines ==
The station is served by the Nemuro Main Line, and lies 175.0 km from the starting point of the line at Shintoku. It is also the nominal terminus of the 166.2 kilometer Senmō Main Line from Abashiri. also most trains continue on for another 1.9 kilometers to terminate at Kushiro.

== Layout ==
Higashi-Kushiro Station has one island platform and two tracks. Due to the former presence of sidings, there is some distance between the station building and the platform, and they are connected by a footbridge and a level crossing within the premises. Platform 1 generally serves the Senmō Main Line, and platform 2 the Nemuro Main Line (Hanasaki Line), but both lines are designed to allow trains to depart and arrive in either direction.

=== Platforms ===
1	■ Senmō Main Line	for Mashū and Abashiri for Kushiro
2	■ Nemuro Main Line	for Kushiro for Akkeshi and Nemuro

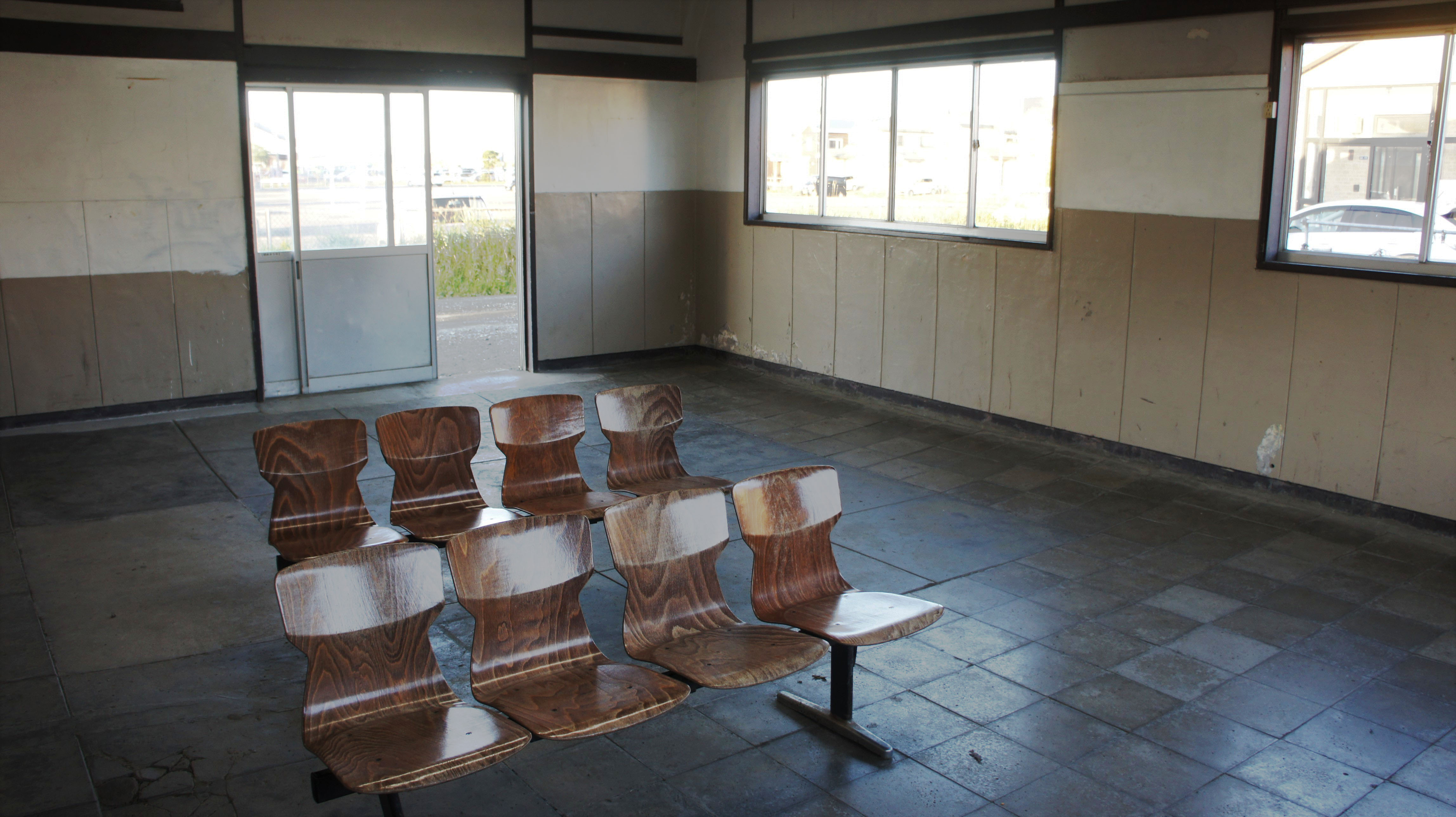
Waiting Room

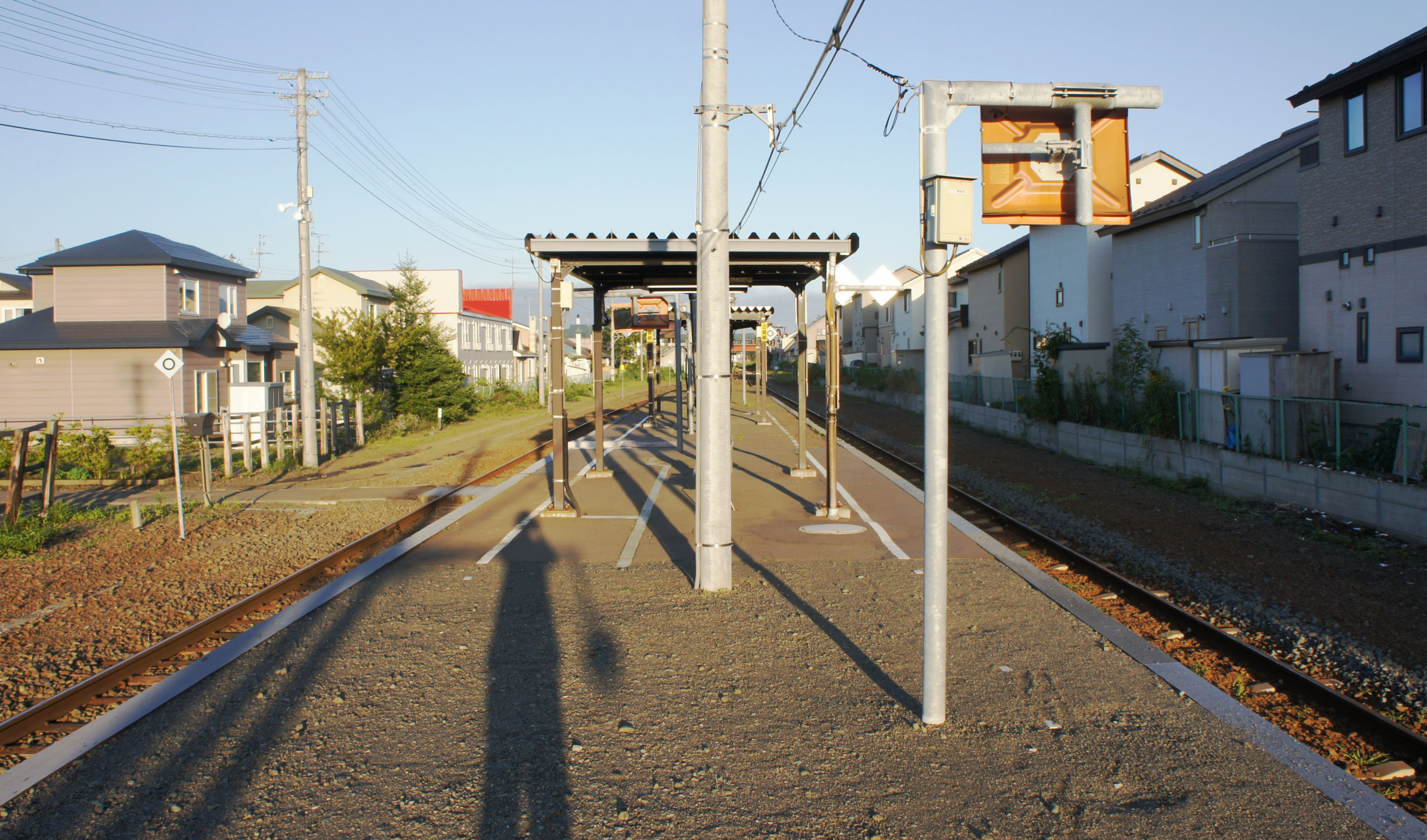
Platform

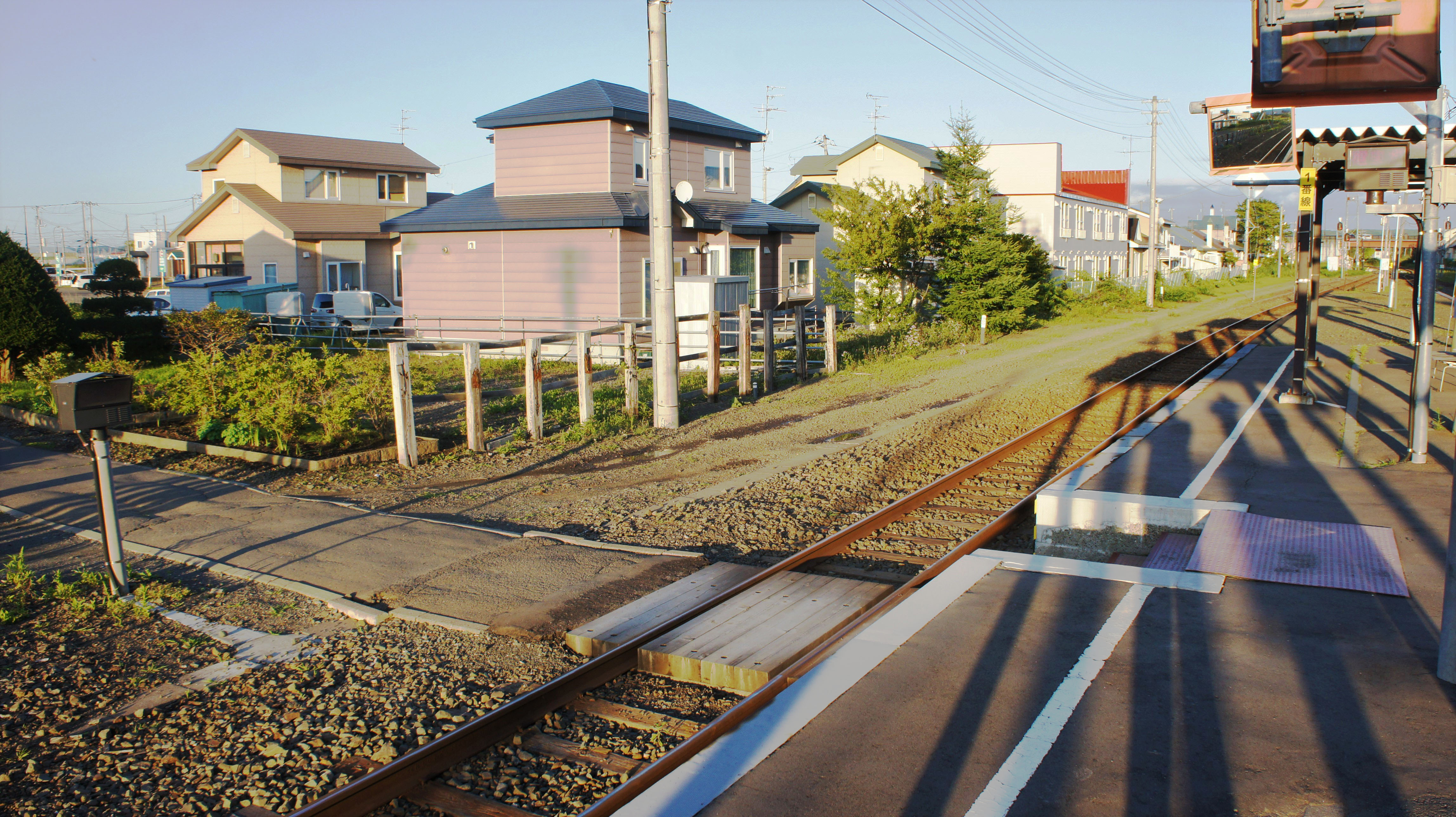
Level crossing

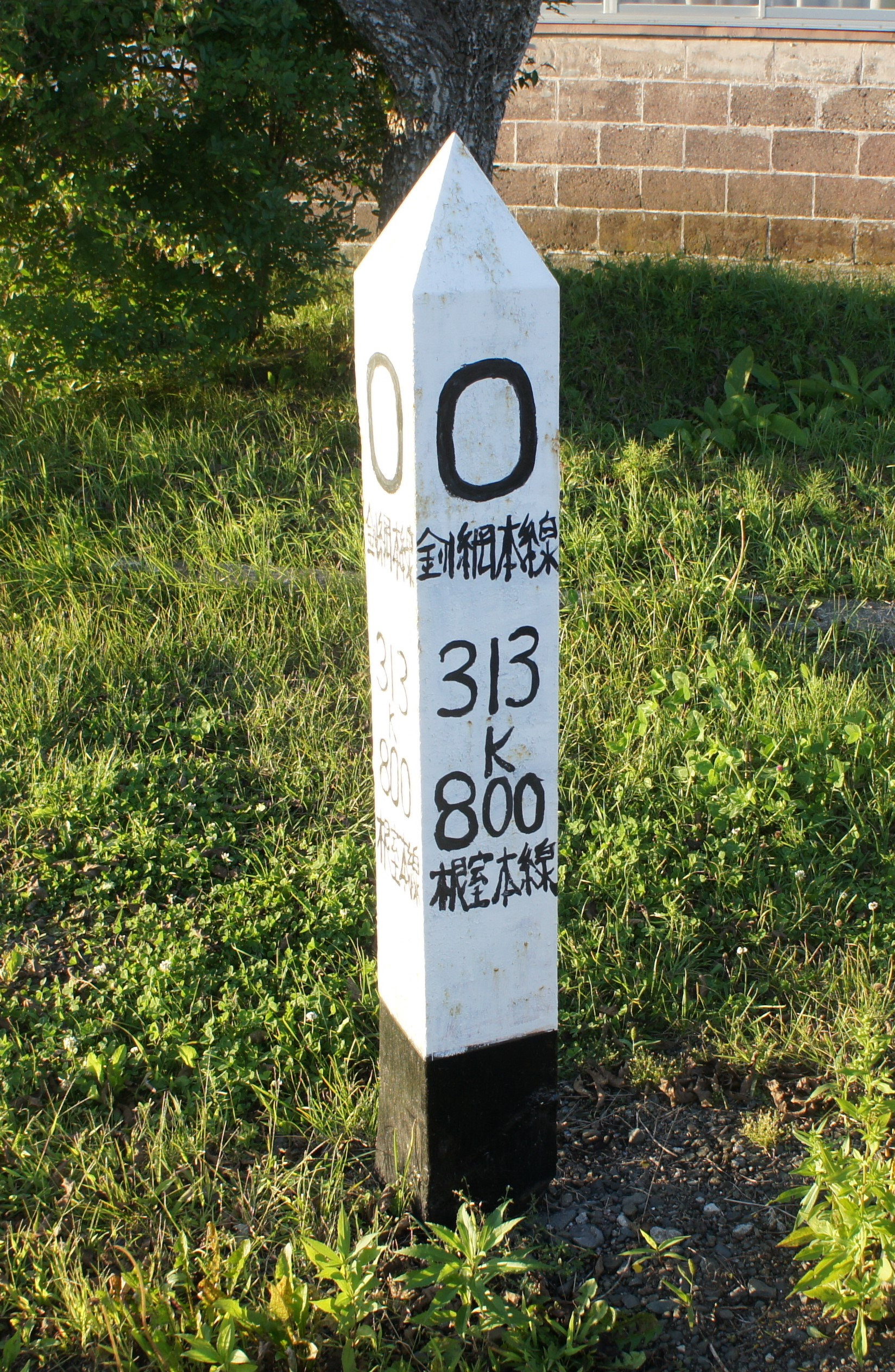
Terminus marker for Senmō Main Line

== History ==
The first station opened on 16 March 1925 as a signal stop on the Japanese Government Railways. It was elevated as to a full station on 11 November 1928. The current station building was completed in 1957.. Following the privatization of the Japanese National Railways on 1 April 1987, the station came under the control of JR Hokkaido.

== Passenger statistics ==
In fiscal 2022, the station was used by an average of 131 passengers daily.

== Surrounding area ==
The surrounding area was once home to offices and factories of companies affiliated with the Pacific Coal Mine, but these have since been converted into large retail stores and residential areas.

- Japan National Route 44
- Japan National Route 391
- Higashi-Kushiro Shell Mound, National Historic Site

== See also ==
- List of railway stations in Japan
