= Abashiri Station =

Railway station in Abashiri, Hokkaido, Japan

Abashiri Station 網走駅
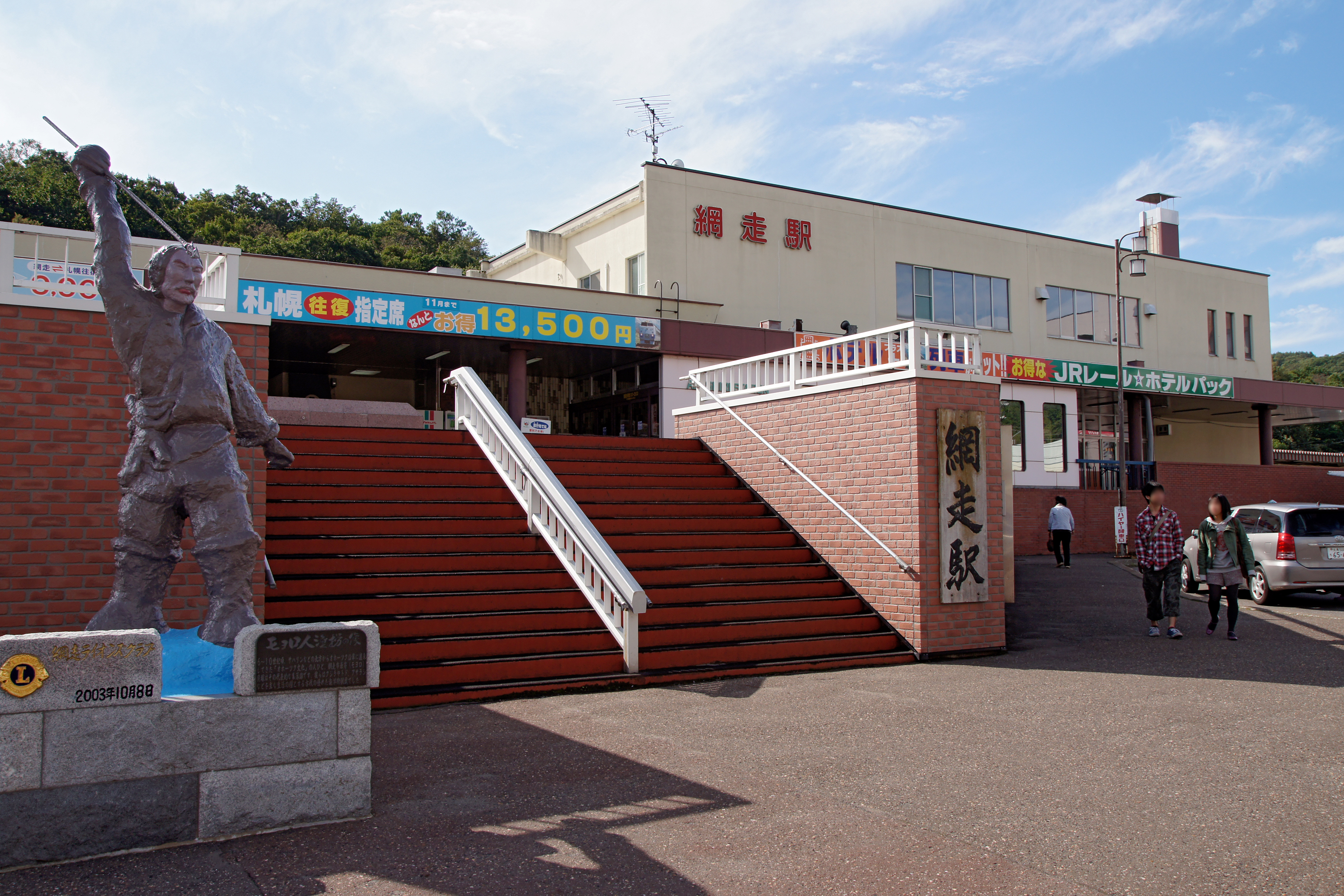

General information
- Location: 2-2-12 Shin-machi, Abashiri, Hokkaido （北海道網走市新町2丁目2-12） Japan
- Coordinates: 44°01′12″N 144°15′15″E
- Operator: JR Hokkaido
- Lines: Sekihoku Main Line; Senmō Main Line

Other information
- Station code: A69

History
- Opened: 1912

Passengers
- FY2023: 562 (daily)
Location

Abashiri Station (網走駅, Abashiri-eki) is a railway station in Abashiri, Hokkaido, Japan, operated by the Hokkaido Railway Company (JR Hokkaido), located. It is the main railway station in the city. Abashiri Station comes first in an alphabetical list of Japanese railway stations (Zushi·Hayama Station is last).

== Lines ==
Abashiri Station is served by the Sekihoku Main Line from Shin-Asahikawa, and the Senmō Main Line from Higashi-Kushiro.

Okhotsk and Taisetsu limited express trains and Shiretoko rapid services terminate at this station. The Yūmō Line formerly diverged from here, but the line was closed on March 20, 1987.

== Station layout ==
The station consists of one side platforms and one island platform serving two tracks. There is a ticket office (business hours: 05:30 to 23:00), automatic ticket machines, and a travel centre (business hours: 09:30 to 17:30).

Abashiri Station is unusual in having the station name sign at the entrance to the building written vertically instead of horizontally. This was intended to ensure that prisoners released from nearby Abashiri Prison and returning to their hometowns from the station would not "revert sideways" (横道にそれない) to a life of crime.

== Buses ==
Abashiri Bus, Abashiri Kōtsū Bus, Akan Bus, Shari Bus and joint operating companies all operate to/from the station. The tourist information centre in Abashiri Station handles tickets for tour buses. The bus stop for services to Higashi Mokoto (Abashiri Kōtsū Bus) does not have a number.

=== Bus stops ===
No. 1 Stop	Kōyō Apartments, Shiretoko National Park (Utoro Onsen), Aurora Terminal, Tour buses
No. 2 Stop	Tokoro, Bihoro, Memanbetsu Airport, Ōmagari, Tentozan, Lake Akan
No. 3 Stop	Shari, Koshimizu, Tsukushigaoka Apartments, Tokyo Agriculture University, Abashiri Bus Terminal
No. 4 Stop	no service
	Higashi Mokoto

Hokkaidō Chūō Bus, Hokkaidō Kitami Bus and Abashiri Bus operate services from Abashiri Bus Terminal to Sapporo.

== History ==
- October 5, 1912: Abashiri Station was opened by the National Railway Authority.
- September 15, 1927: The Railways Ministry opened the Senmō Line (which later became the Senmō Main Line).
- December 1, 1932: The passenger station was moved to its present location, and the original station was renamed Hama-Abashiri Station and converted to freight-only.
- October 10, 1935: The Yūmō East Line (later the Yūmō Line) opened between Abashiri and Ubaranai.
- February 1, 1984: Freight services to Hama-Abashiri were discontinued.
- March 20, 1987: The Yūmō Line closed.
- April 1, 1987: Abashiri Station was transferred to JR Hokkaido following privatization of the Japanese National Railways.

== Adjacent stations ==
«	Service	»
Sekihoku Main Line
Memambetsu	Limited Express Okhotsk	Terminus
Memambetsu	Special Rapid Taisetsu	Terminus
Yobito	Local	Terminus
Senmō Main Line
Terminus	Rapid Shiretoko	Mokoto
Terminus	Local	Katsuradai
