= Akan, Hokkaido =

Akan 阿寒町
- Town
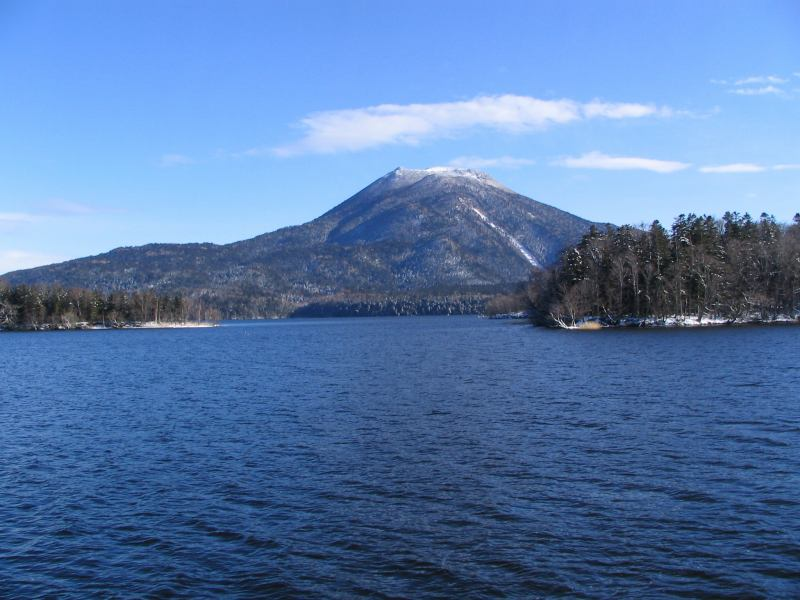
- Lake Akan and Mount Oakan

- Flag Emblem

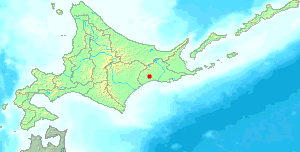
- Location of Akan in Hokkaido (Kushiro Subprefecture)

- Location in Japan
- Coordinates: 43°6′6″N 144°7′11″E
- Country: Japan
- Region: Hokkaido
- Prefecture: Hokkaido (Kushiro Subprefecture)
- Now part of Kushiro: October 11, 2005

Area
  - Total: 739.25 km^{2} (285.43 sq mi)

Population (September 30, 2004)
  - Total: 6,518
- Time zone: UTC+09:00 (JST)
- City hall address: 1-4-1, Chuo, Akan-cho, Akan-gun, Hokkaido; 085-0292
- Website: web.archive.org/web/20050827010514/http://town.akan.hokkaido.jp/
- Symbols
- Flower: Convallaria keiskei
- Tree: Prunus sargentii

Akan (阿寒町, Akan-chō) was a town located in Akan District, Kushiro Subprefecture, Hokkaido, Japan.

As of September 30, 2004, it had an estimated population of 6,518 and an area of 739.25 km^{2}. The name comes from an Ainu word meaning "eternal" or "unchanging".

On October 11, 2005, Akan, along with the town of Onbetsu (from Shiranuka District), was merged into the expanded city of Kushiro.

On January 8, 2017, the township of Akan hosted the first national championship in bandy, although the size of the field was a smaller version than the official rules for a bandy field.

== History ==
In 1887, the main town hall for Akan District was established. In 1923, Akan became a second-class municipality. In 1937, it and Tsurui Village split off. In 1940, Akan became a first-class municipality. In 1957, Akan Village became Akan Town. On October 11, 2005, Akan was merged into the expanded Kushiro City.
