= Kushiro-shitsugen National Park =

National park in Hokkaido, Japan

Kushiro-Shitsugen National Park 釧路湿原国立公園
- IUCN category II (national park)
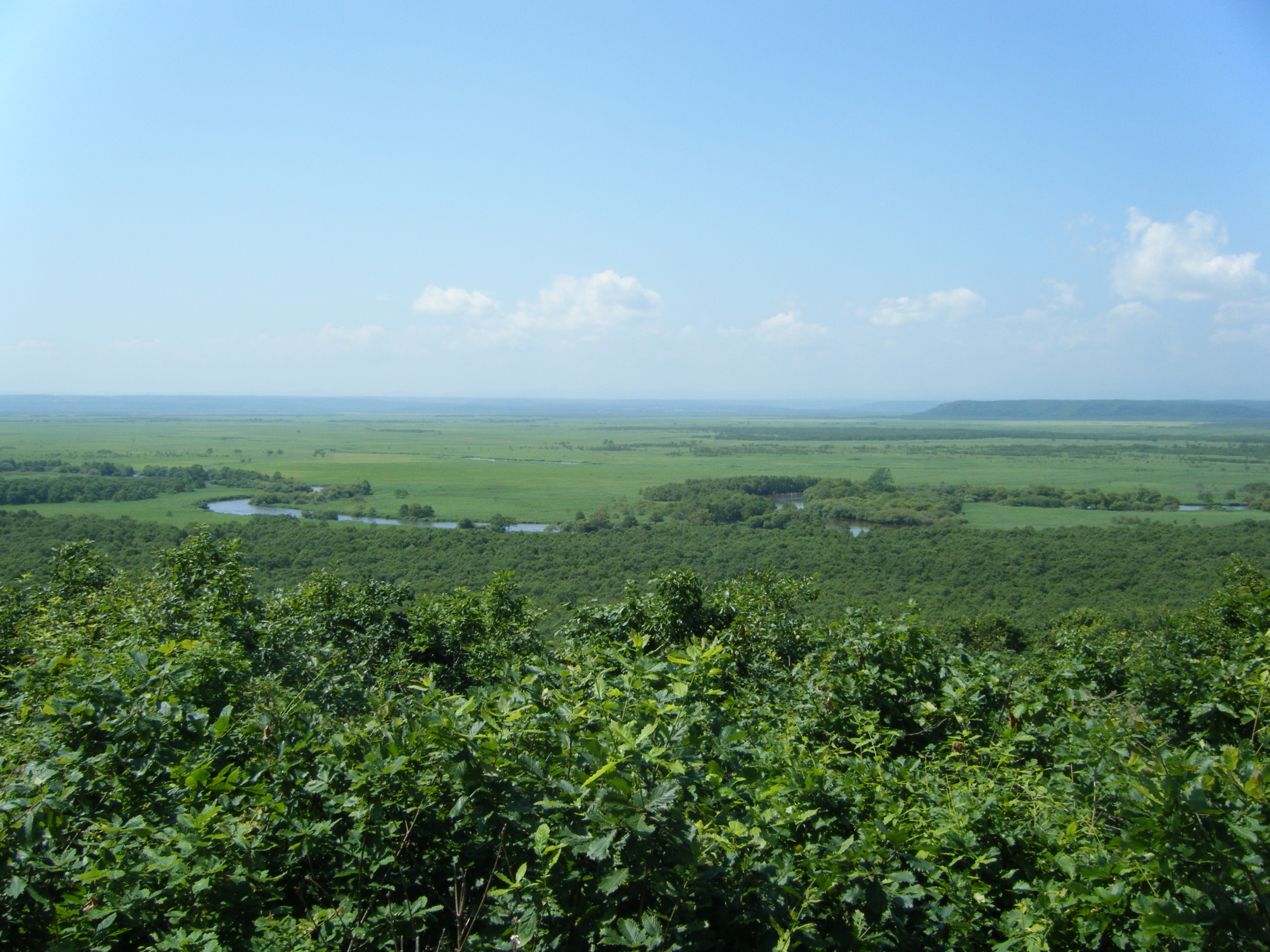

- Location within Hokkaido Location within Japan
- Location: Hokkaido, Japan
- Coordinates: 43.108°N 144.401°E
- Area: 268.61 km^{2} (103.71 sq mi)
- Established: 31 July 1987
- Governing body: Ministry of the Environment (Japan)

Ramsar Wetland
- Official name: Kushiro-shitsugen
- Designated: 17 June 1980
- Reference no.: 205

Kushiro-Shitsugen National Park (釧路湿原国立公園, Kushiro-Shitsugen Kokuritsu Kōen) is a national park located in the east of the island of Hokkaido, Japan. It was designated as a national park on 31 July 1987. The park is known for its wetlands ecosystems.

Kushiro-shitsugen (Kushiro Wetlands or Kushiro Swamp or Marshland) covers an area of 268.61 square kilometres (103.71 mi^{2}) on the Kushiro Plain (Kushiro-heiya) and contains the largest tracts of reedbeds in Japan. The Kushiro River (154 kilometres (96 mi)), which originates in Lake Kussharo, meanders through much of the park. During the Ramsar Convention of 1980, in which Japan participated, the park was first registered as a peatland with raised bogs. In 1967, the wetlands (shitsugen) themselves had been designated as a national natural monument. For that reason, access is strictly limited and the landscape, most typical of Hokkaido, has been preserved.

== Wildlife ==
The vegetation of the park consists of reeds, sedges, peat moss wetlands, and black alder thickets. The rivers which bend freely back and forth, groups of lakes and marshes, and other wet ecosystems comprise a varied environment. Kushiro-shitsugen is home to over 600 species of plants. The park is a valuable haven for wild species such as the red-crowned crane (Grus japonensis), huchen (Hucho perryi), Siberian salamander (Salamandrella keyserlingii) and dragonfly (Leucorrhinia intermedia ijimai).

== Geography ==
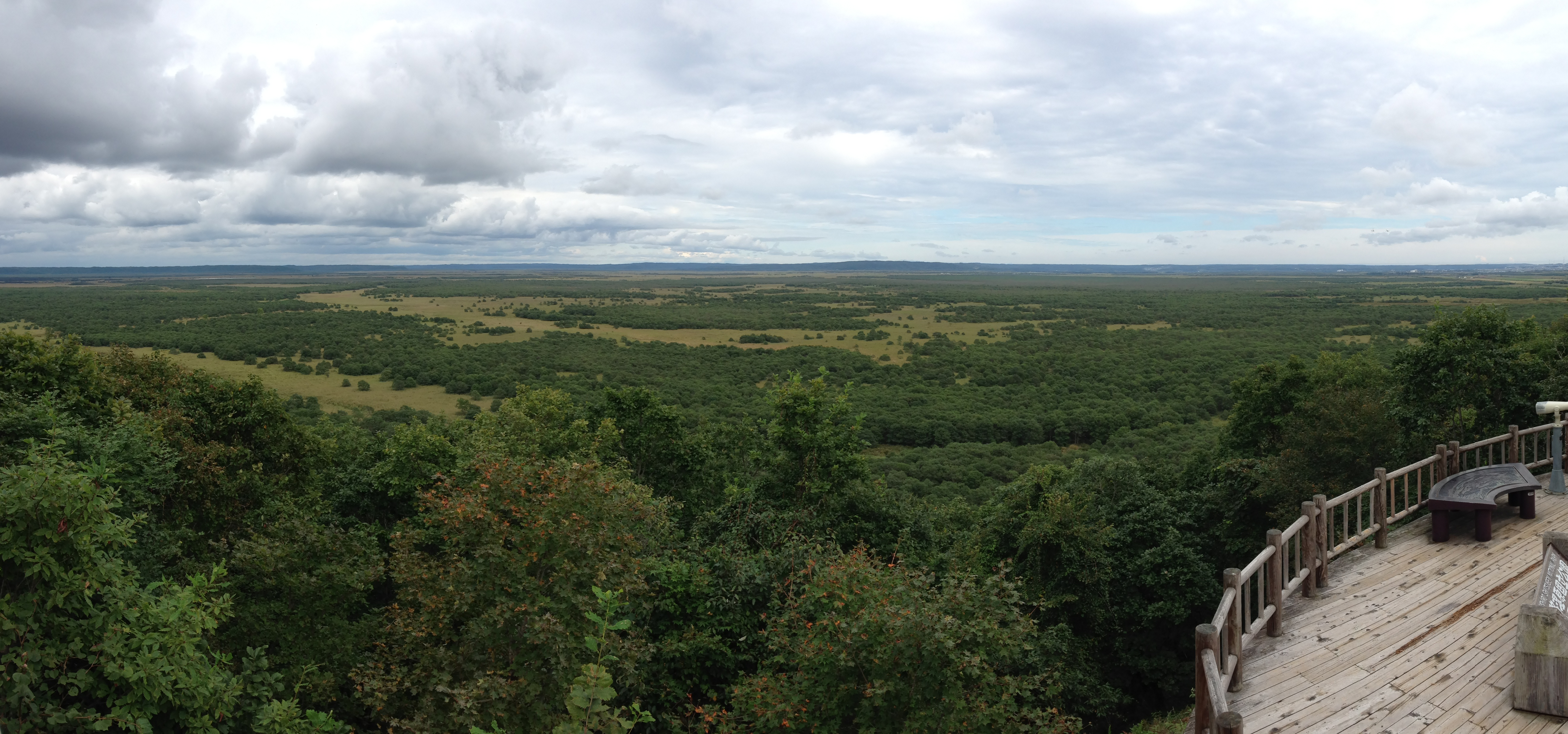
A panoramic view of Kushiro Marsh, September 2014

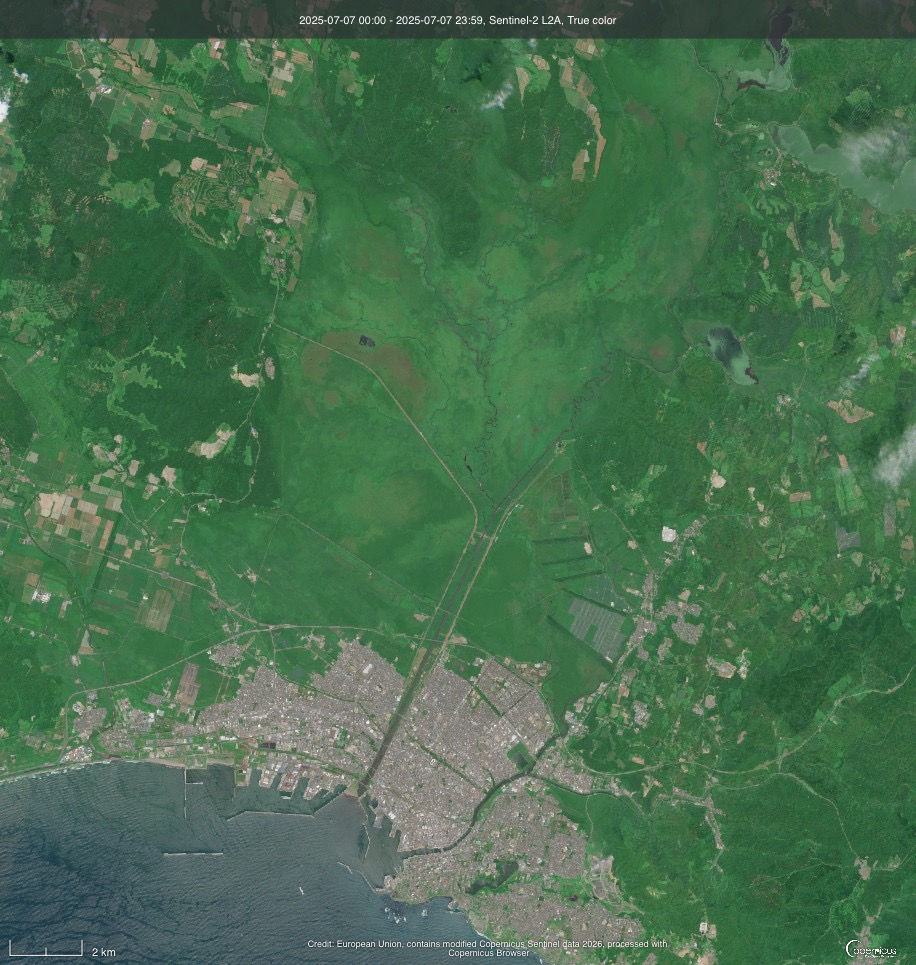
Aerial image in July 2026

== Megasolar issue ==
About 1 kilometre (0.62 mi) south of the park, mega solar farms are built due to it being an ideal place for solar farms. Several environmental groups and local residents express concerns for the environmental impact of the solar farms.

== In popular culture ==
The area was the setting for the 2014 Studio Ghibli film When Marnie Was There.

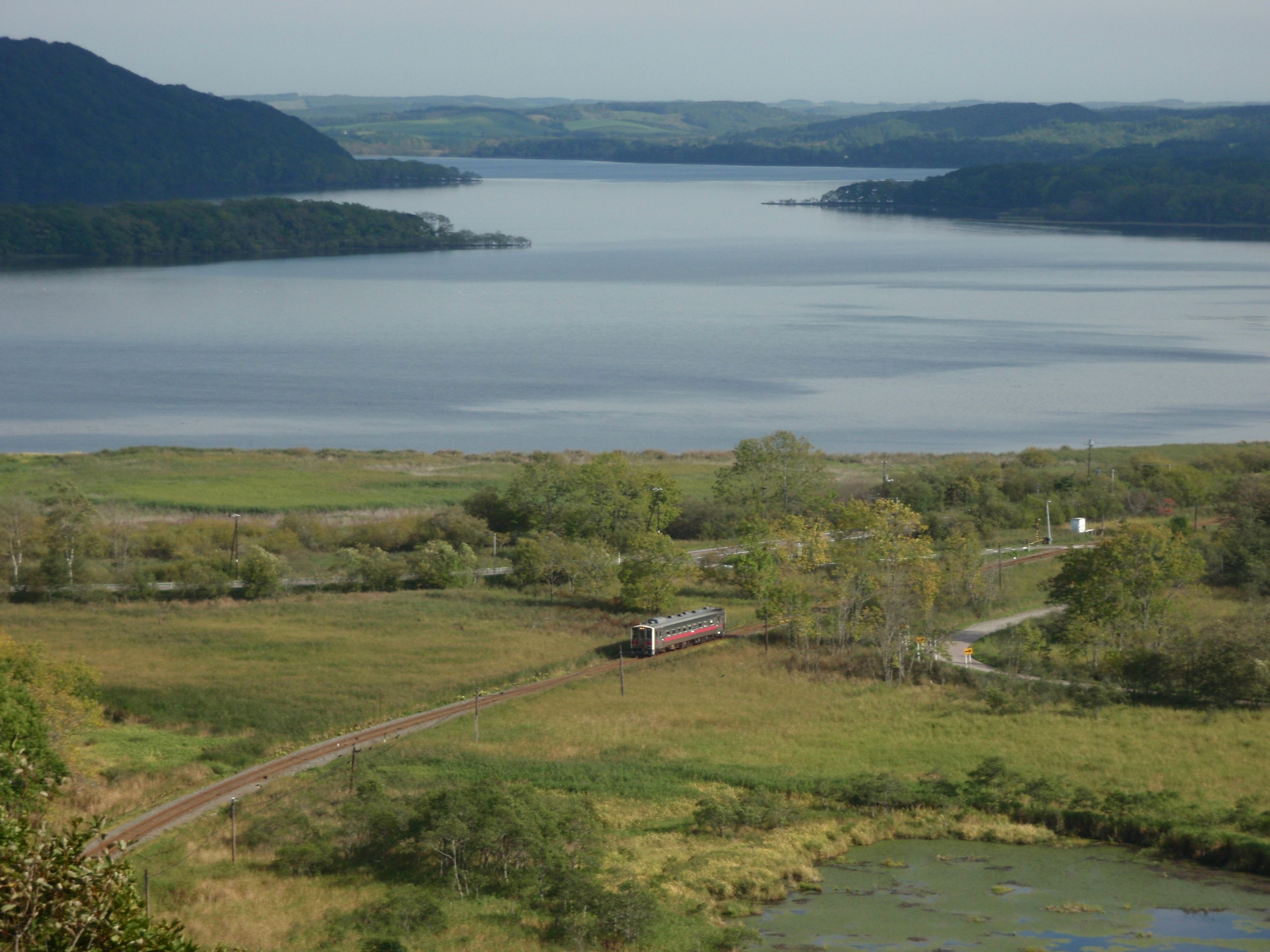
Train passing through, Kushiro Wetlands, in Hokkaido, Japan

== Related cities, towns, and villages ==
- Kushiro Subprefecture
  - Kushiro, Hokkaidō
  - Kushiro, Hokkaidō (town)
  - Shibecha, Hokkaidō
  - Tsurui, Hokkaidō

== See also ==
- List of national parks of Japan
