= Onbetsu, Hokkaido =

Onbetsu 音別町
- Town
- Flag Emblem

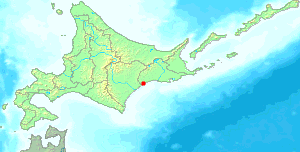
- Location of Onbetsu in Hokkaido (Kushiro Subprefecture)

- Location in Japan
- Coordinates: 42°59′N 144°23′E
- Country: Japan
- Region: Hokkaido
- Prefecture: Hokkaido (Kushiro Subprefecture)
- Now part of Kushiro: October 11, 2005

Area
  - Total: 401.40 km^{2} (154.98 sq mi)

Population (September 30, 2004)
  - Total: 2,821
- Time zone: UTC+09:00 (JST)
- City hall address: 1-40 Honmachi, Onbetsu-cho, Shiranuka-gun, Hokkaido; 088-0192
- Website: web.archive.org/web/20050617235520/http://www.onbetsu-hokkaido.jp/
- Symbols
- Flower: Gentiana triflora var. japonica
- Tree: Sorbus commixta

Onbetsu (音別町, Onbetsu-chō) was a town located in Shiranuka District, Kushiro Subprefecture, Hokkaido, Japan.

== Population ==
As of September 30, 2004, it had an estimated population of 2,821 and an area of 401.40 km^{2}.

== History ==
- 1919 - Established as a village
- 1922 - Renamed to Onbetsu Village
- 1959 - Becomes Onbetsu Town
- October 11, 2005 - Onbetsu was merged into the expanded Kushiro City

== Merge ==
On October 11, 2005, Onbetsu, along with the town of Akan (from Akan District) was merged into the expanded city of Kushiro.

== Industry ==
Onbetsu is the location of the Onbetsu Power Station, a diesel-powered facility.
