= Otanoshike Station =

Railway station in Kushiro, Hokkaido, Japan

K50 Otanoshike Station 大楽毛駅
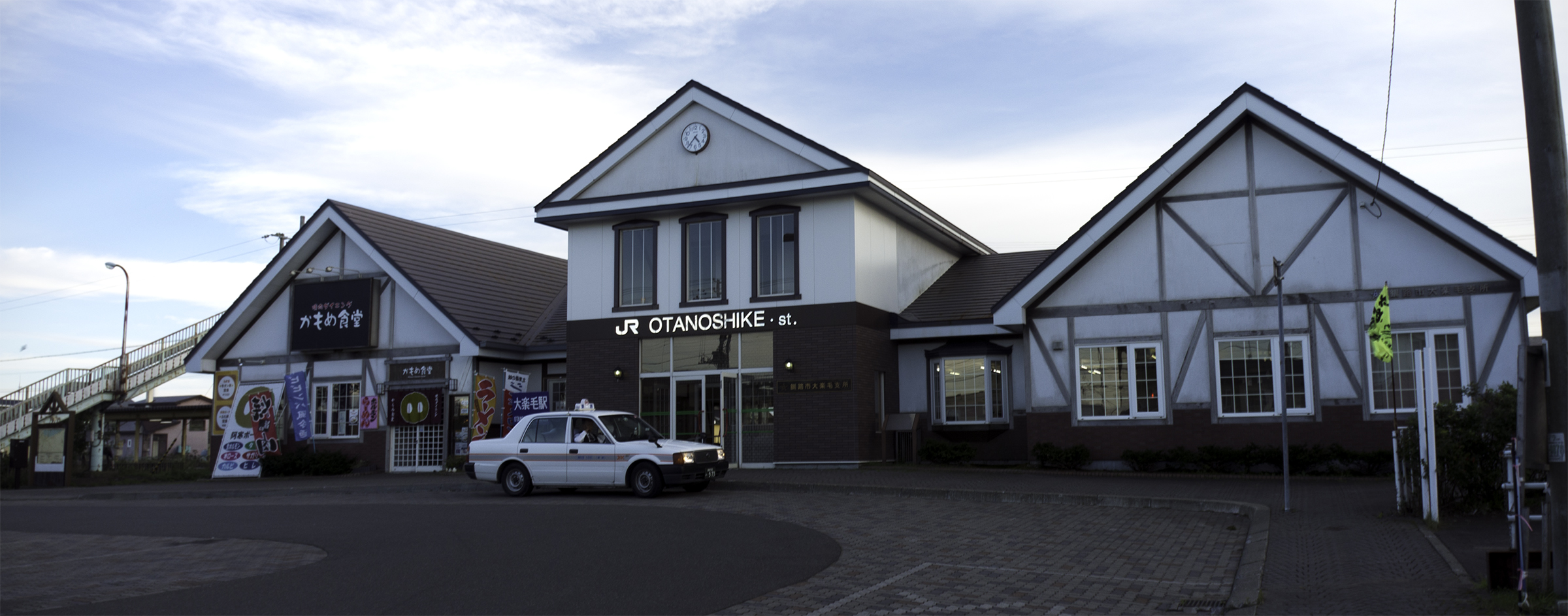
- Station building in September 2013

General information
- Location: 5-chōme-1 Otanoshike, Kushiro, Hokkaido 084-0917; Japan
- Coordinates: 43°0′33.57″N 144°16′21.54″E
- System: regional rail
- Operator: JR Hokkaido; JR Freight
- Line: Nemuro Main Line
- Distance: 162.7 km from Shintoku
- Platforms: 1 island platform
- Tracks: 2

Other information
- Status: Unattended
- Station code: K50
- Website: Official website

History
- Opened: 20 July 1901; 125 years ago

Passengers
- FY2014: 150 daily

Services
Preceding station	JR Hokkaido	Following station
Shin-Otanoshike towards Takikawa	Nemuro Main Line Local	Shiranuka towards Nemuro
Location
- Location within Hokkaido Location within Japan

Otanoshike Station (大楽毛駅, Otanoshike-eki) is a railway station located in the city of Kushiro, Hokkaidō, Japan. It is operated by JR Hokkaido. The station is also a freight depot for the Japan Freight Railway Company (JR Freight).

== Lines ==
The station is served by the Nemuro Main Line, and lies 162.7 km from the starting point of the line at Shintoku .

== Layout ==
Otanoshike Station has one island platform, connected by an open footbridge to the station building. All trains normally use Platform 1. The station is unattended, but the station building doubles as a branch of Kushiro city hall. The building exterior is modeled after a former horse inspection station.

=== Platforms ===
1	■ Nemuro Main Line	for Obihiro and Shintoku
2	■ Nemuro Main Line	for Kushiro

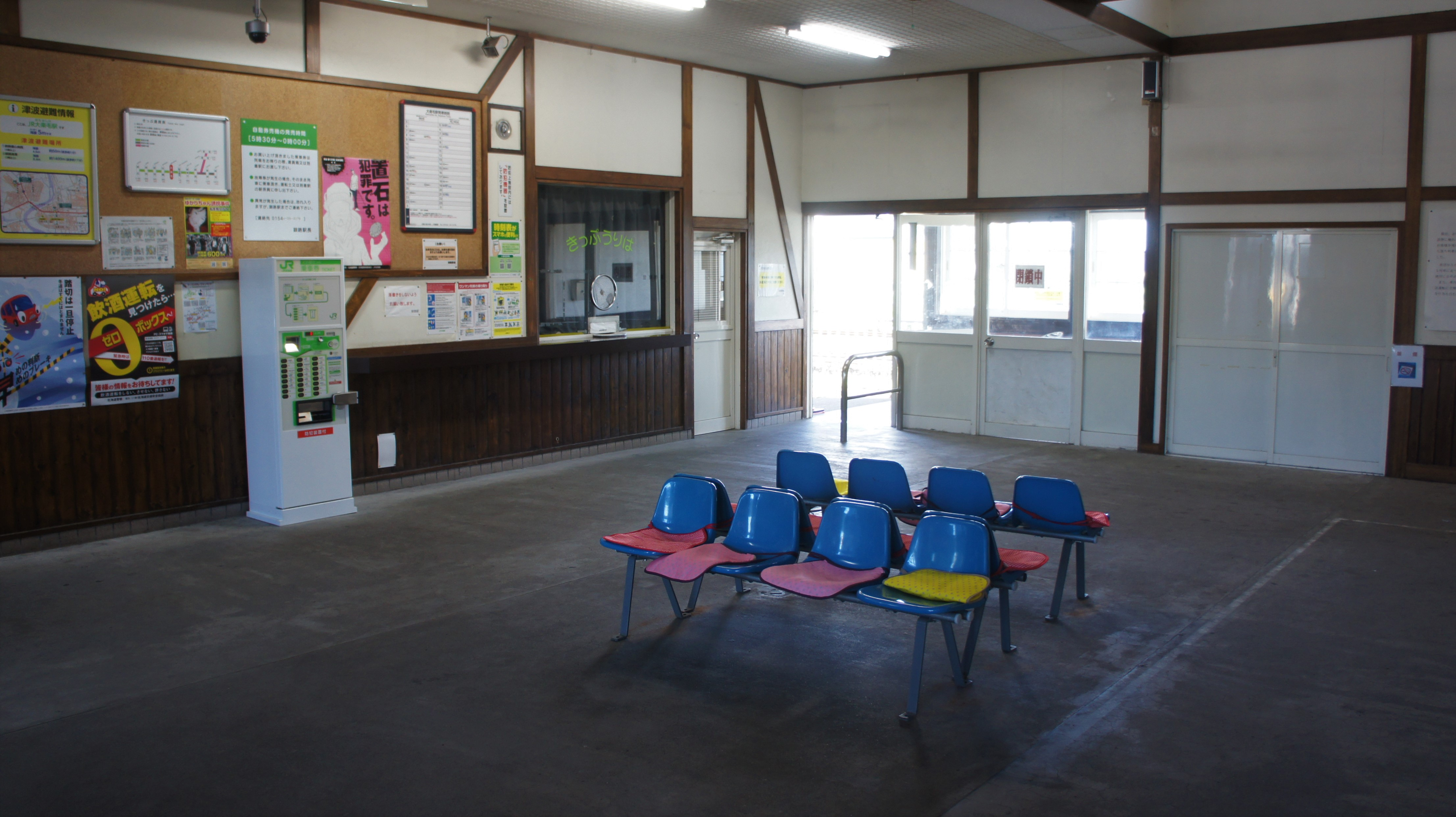
Waiting room

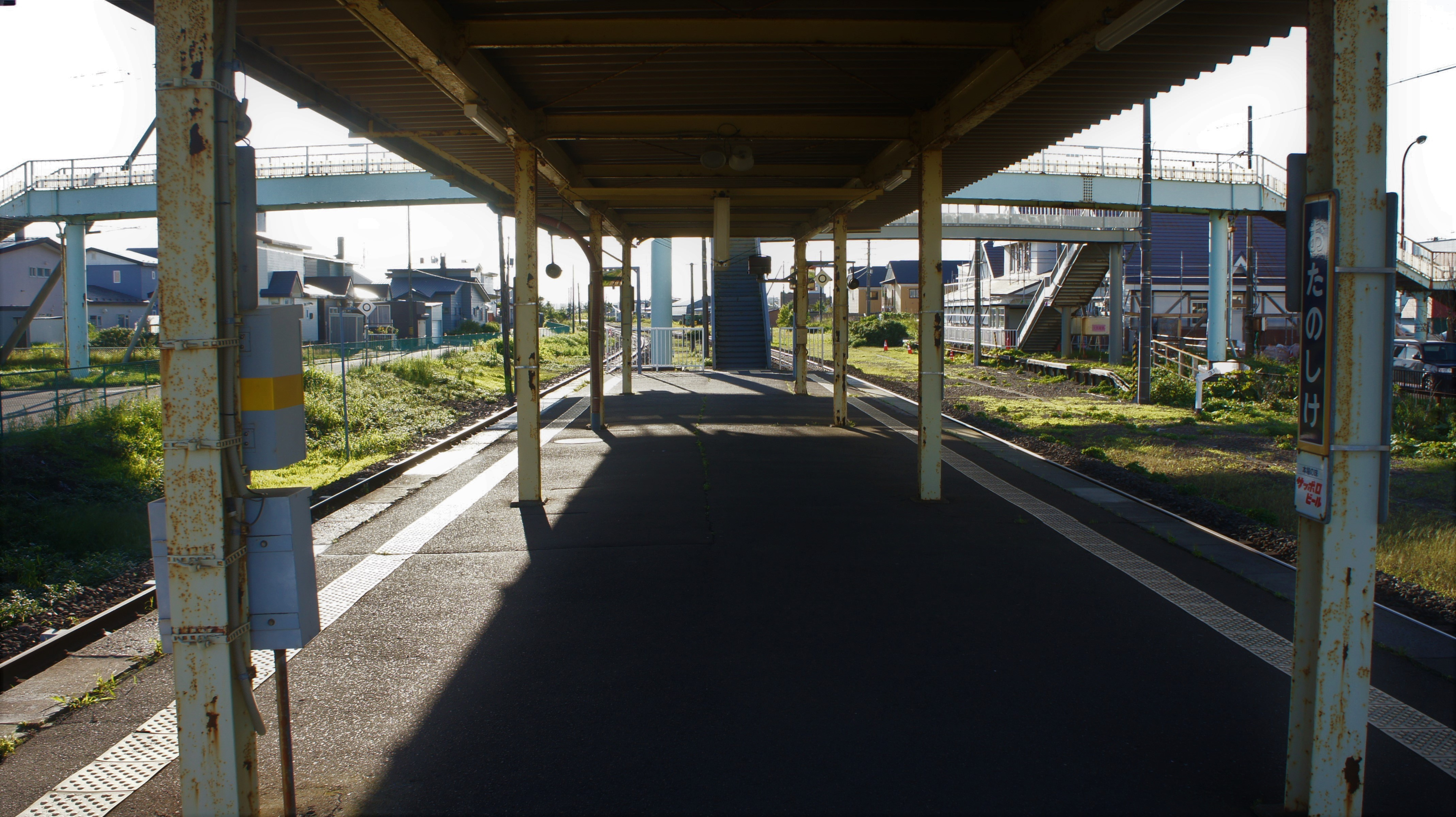
Platform

== History ==
The station opened on 20 July 1901 as a station on the Hokkaidō Kansetsu Tetsudō. It was transferred to the Ministry of Railways on 1 April 1905. Before World War II, the area was a major production region for cavalry horses, and after the war, it developed as a freight center for handling wood chips for nearby paper mills. However, from around the 1970s, wood chips were gradually transported by truck, and freight handling was discontinued and the dedicated freight line was removed. Following the privatization of the Japanese National Railways on 1 April 1987, the station came under the control of JR Hokkaido. The current station building dates to 2 October 1989.

== Passenger statistics ==
In fiscal 2014, the station was used by an average of 150 passengers daily.

== Surrounding area ==
The station serves suburban residential area of Kushiro City. It is frequently used by commuters to Kushiro city center, as well as by students commuting to technical colleges.

- Japan National Route 38
- Japan National Route 240
- National Institute of Technology, Kushiro College
- Kushiro Livestock Market

== See also ==
- List of railway stations in Japan
