= Tsurui =

Tsurui 鶴居村 Tsurui-mura
- Village
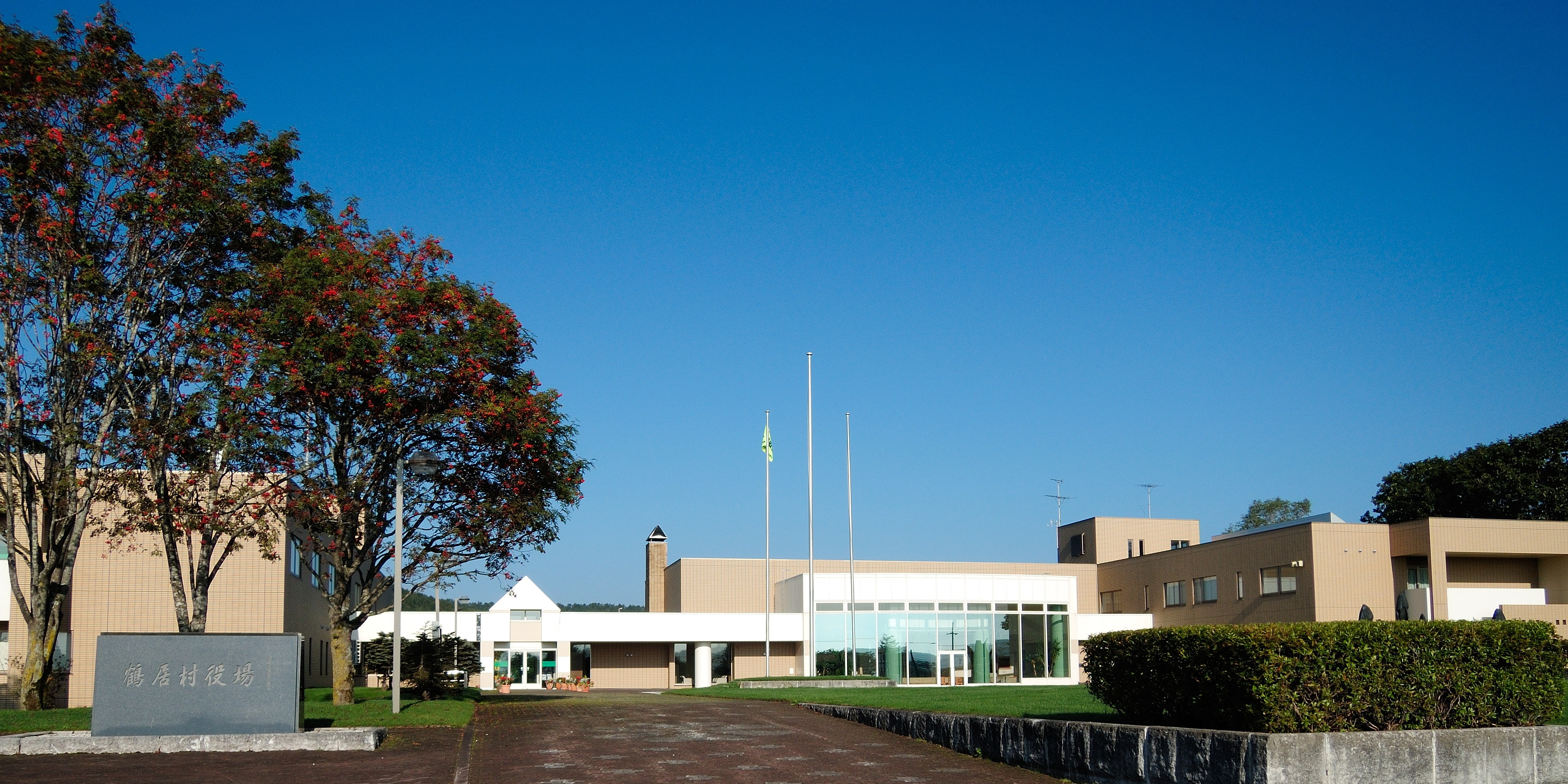
- Tsurui village hall

- Flag Emblem

- Location of Tsurui in Hokkaido (Kushiro Subprefecture)
- Interactive map of Tsurui
- Location within Japan
- Coordinates: 43°13′48″N 144°19′16″E
- Country: Japan
- Region: Hokkaido
- Prefecture: Hokkaido (Kushiro Subprefecture)
- District: Akan

Area
  - Total: 1,099.37 km^{2} (424.47 sq mi)

Population (November 30, 2025)
  - Total: 2,362
  - Density: 2.149/km^{2} (5.565/sq mi)
- Time zone: UTC+09:00 (JST)
- City hall address: 1-1 Tsurui-nishi, Tsurui-mura, Akan-gun, Hokkaido, Japan.
- Climate: Dfb
- Website: www.vill.tsurui.lg.jp
- Symbols
- Bird: Red-crowned crane
- Flower: Cosmos
- Tree: Japanese White Birch

Tsurui (鶴居村, Tsurui-mura) is a village located in Kushiro Subprefecture, Hokkaidō, Japan. As of 30 November 2025, the village had an estimated population of 2,362 in 1186 households, and a population density of 2.1 people per km^{2}. The total area of the village is 571.80 km^{2} (220.77 sq mi). Tsurui is a breeding ground for the red-crowned crane, deemed one of the 100 Soundscapes of Japan. It is a member of "The Most Beautiful Villages in Japan" Association.

== Geography ==
Tsurui is located approximately in the center of the Kushiro Subprefecture. It consists of wilderness areas spread across the drainage basins of three rivers: the Setsuri River, the Hororo River, and the Kuchoro River, which flow through the Akan Caldera.

The village's lowest elevation is 3.6 meters in the southern marshland area, and its highest point is 812 meters in the primeval forest at the foot of Mount Akan. Part of the village is within the borders of the Kushiro-shitsugen National Park.

=== Neighboring municipalities ===
  - Kushiro town
  - Kushiro city
  - Shibecha

=== Climate ===
According to the Köppen climate classification, Tsurui has a subarctic climate or a humid continental climate depending on location. It has large temperature differences, including large annual and daily temperature ranges. It receives a lot of snow, and is designated as a heavy snow area. In winter, temperatures below -20 °C are not uncommon, making it extremely cold.

Climate data for Tsurui（1991 - 2020）
| Month | Jan | Feb | Mar | Apr | May | Jun | Jul | Aug | Sep | Oct | Nov | Dec | Year |
|---|---|---|---|---|---|---|---|---|---|---|---|---|---|
| Record high °C (°F) | 8.8 (47.8) | 13.9 (57.0) | 16.3 (61.3) | 27.1 (80.8) | 35.0 (95.0) | 32.0 (89.6) | 34.7 (94.5) | 35.1 (95.2) | 32.0 (89.6) | 26.1 (79.0) | 21.0 (69.8) | 13.1 (55.6) | 35.1 (95.2) |
| Mean daily maximum °C (°F) | −0.8 (30.6) | −0.3 (31.5) | 3.8 (38.8) | 10.1 (50.2) | 15.8 (60.4) | 18.9 (66.0) | 22.2 (72.0) | 23.7 (74.7) | 21.1 (70.0) | 15.7 (60.3) | 8.7 (47.7) | 1.8 (35.2) | 11.7 (53.1) |
| Daily mean °C (°F) | −7.1 (19.2) | −6.5 (20.3) | −1.7 (28.9) | 4.0 (39.2) | 9.4 (48.9) | 13.3 (55.9) | 17.2 (63.0) | 18.7 (65.7) | 15.7 (60.3) | 9.4 (48.9) | 2.5 (36.5) | −4.4 (24.1) | 5.9 (42.6) |
| Mean daily minimum °C (°F) | −13.9 (7.0) | −13.8 (7.2) | −7.8 (18.0) | −1.8 (28.8) | 3.6 (38.5) | 8.8 (47.8) | 13.4 (56.1) | 14.9 (58.8) | 10.8 (51.4) | 3.2 (37.8) | −3.6 (25.5) | −10.8 (12.6) | 0.3 (32.5) |
| Record low °C (°F) | −27.2 (−17.0) | −26.9 (−16.4) | −21.4 (−6.5) | −13.5 (7.7) | −7.0 (19.4) | −2.4 (27.7) | 0.9 (33.6) | 5.9 (42.6) | −0.2 (31.6) | −6.6 (20.1) | −15.5 (4.1) | −22.5 (−8.5) | −27.2 (−17.0) |
| Average precipitation mm (inches) | 47.9 (1.89) | 30.0 (1.18) | 70.1 (2.76) | 87.7 (3.45) | 122.8 (4.83) | 112.2 (4.42) | 136.6 (5.38) | 168.8 (6.65) | 170.9 (6.73) | 123.8 (4.87) | 75.7 (2.98) | 61.9 (2.44) | 1,203.6 (47.39) |
| Average snowfall cm (inches) | 80 (31) | 72 (28) | 82 (32) | 26 (10) | 1 (0.4) | 0 (0) | 0 (0) | 0 (0) | 0 (0) | 0 (0) | 8 (3.1) | 62 (24) | 332 (131) |
| Average precipitation days (≥ 1.0 mm) | 5.7 | 4.7 | 7.5 | 9.0 | 10.5 | 9.7 | 11.1 | 11.6 | 12.0 | 8.8 | 8.1 | 6.8 | 102.5 |
| Mean monthly sunshine hours | 148.8 | 151.6 | 176.4 | 169.0 | 170.5 | 134.7 | 109.5 | 120.2 | 131.9 | 160.9 | 151.7 | 146.1 | 1,768.4 |
Source 1: Japan Meteorological Agency
Source 2: JMA

=== Demographics ===
Per Japanese census data, the population of Tsurui has remained relatively stable for several decades

Historical population
| Year | Pop. | ±% |
|---|---|---|
| 1970 | 3,015 | — |
| 1980 | 2,638 | −12.5% |
| 1990 | 2,829 | +7.2% |
| 2000 | 2,728 | −3.6% |
| 2010 | 2,629 | −3.6% |
| 2020 | 2,558 | −2.7% |

== History ==
Tsurui was separated from Shitakara Village (present-day Akan Town, Kushiro City) on April 1, 1937.

== Government ==
Tsurui has a mayor-council form of government with a directly elected mayor and a unicameral village council of nine members. Tsurui, as part of Kushiro Subprefecture, contributes one member to the Hokkaidō Prefectural Assembly. In terms of national politics, the village is part of the Hokkaidō 7th district of the lower house of the Diet of Japan.

== Economy ==
Dairy farming and agriculture are the main industries in Tsurui. Per-household agricultural income is among the highest in Japan. The city's cheese has won numerous awards, including the Minister of Agriculture, Forestry and Fisheries Award. Craft beer is brewed here, and grapes for wine are cultivated.

The high winter arrival of red-crowned cranes attracts many long-term photographers from Japan and abroad, contributing to the village's tourism industry.

== Education ==
Tsurui has two public elementary schools and one public middle school operated by the village government. The village does not have a high school.

== Transportation ==
Tsurui does not have any passenger train service. The nearest station is Kushiro Station on the JR Hokkaido Nemuro Main Line.

=== Highways ===
- National Route 274

== Local attractions ==
- Kushiro-shitsugen National Park
- Otowa Bridge (World-famous spot for observing red-crowned cranes)
- Yamazaki Forest (Hokkaido's only and Japan's first privately operated forest therapy base)
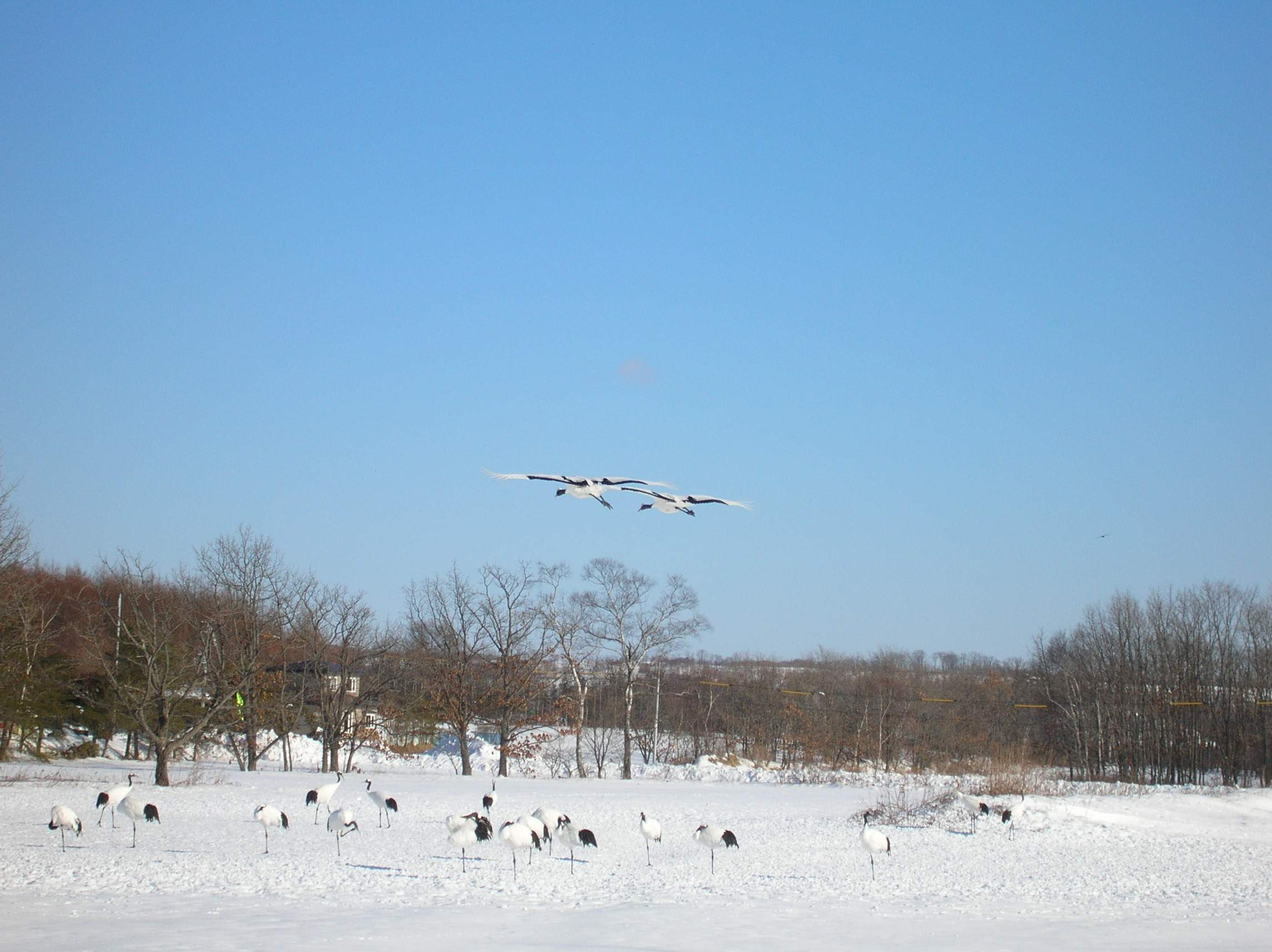
red-crowned cranes

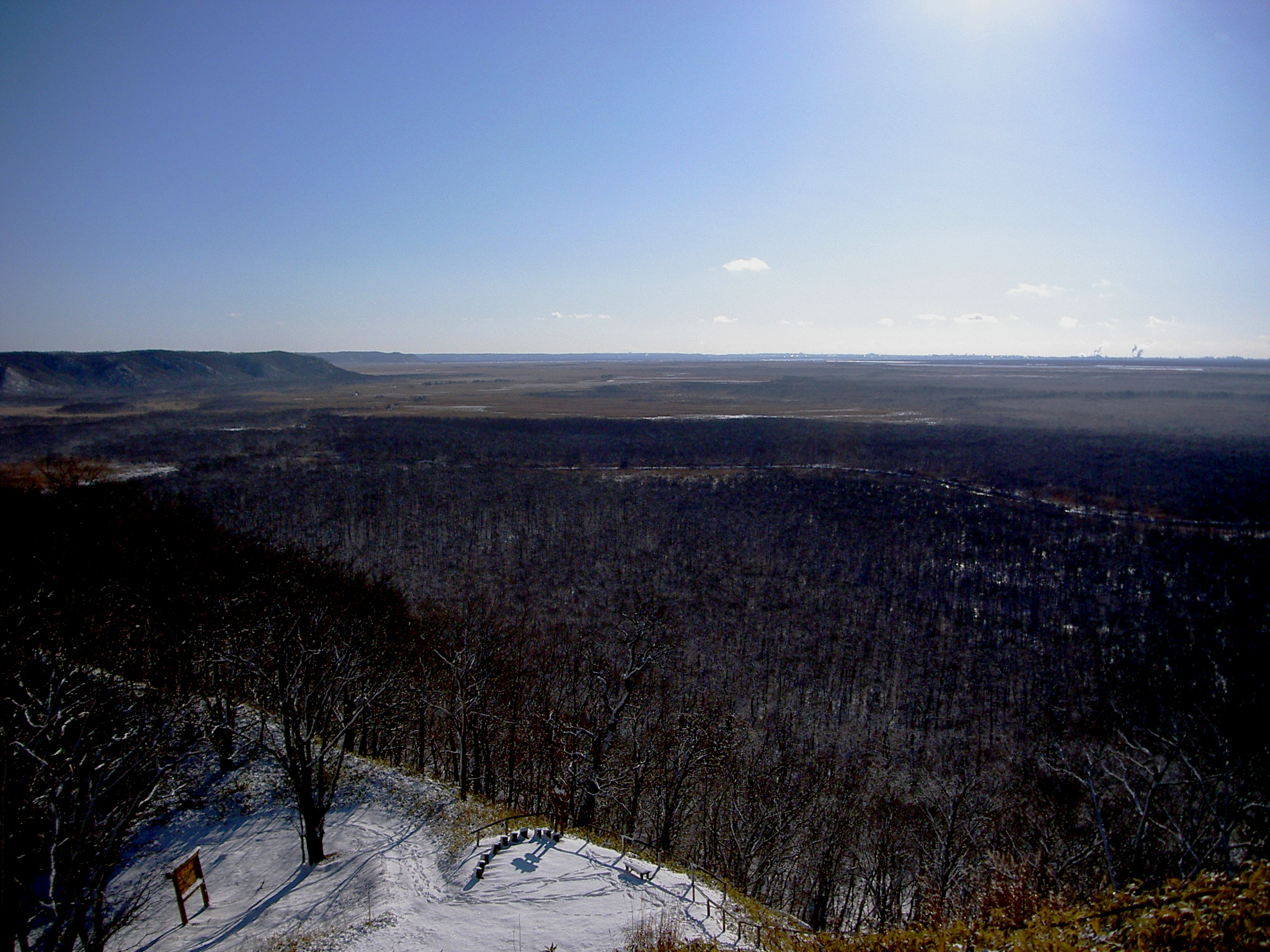
Kushiro Wetlands

== Mascots ==
Tsurubo and Hinabo, the town's mascots

Tsurui's mascots are Tsurubo (つるぼー) and Hinabo (ひなぼー). They are red-crowned crane brothers. They are shaped like bogs of the Kushiro-shitsugen National Park.

- Tsurubo is the oldest of the siblings. His tail resembles a cosmos flower.
- Hinabo is the youngest of the siblings.
