= Kushiro Junior College =

Coordinates: 42°59′12.6″N 144°24′28″E

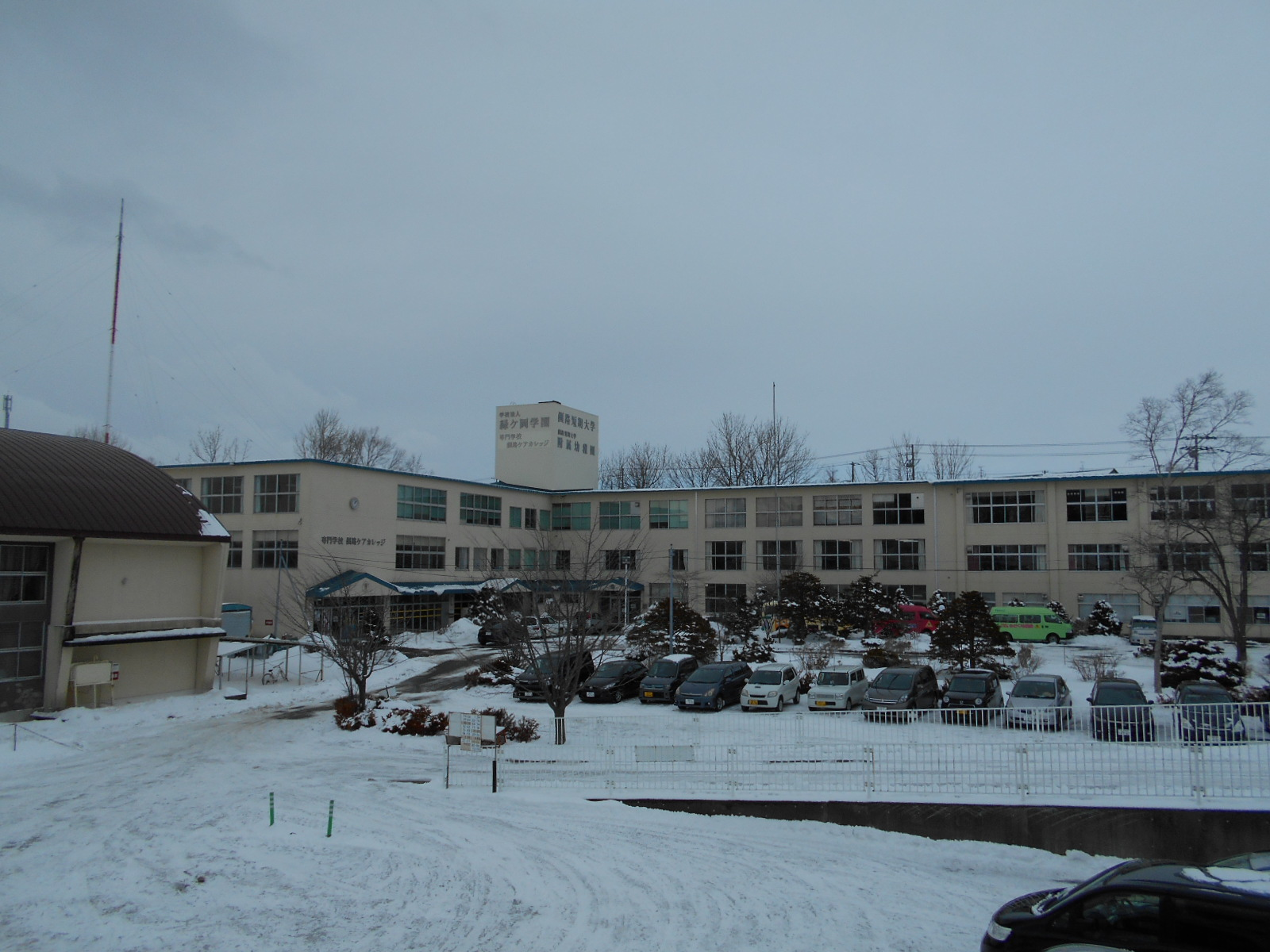

Kushiro Junior College (釧路短期大学, Kushiro tanki daigaku) is a private junior college in Kushiro, Hokkaido, Japan. It was established in 1964 as the Kushiro Women's Junior College and became the Kushio Junior College in 1973. For years it was the only private higher education institute in eastern Hokkaido.
