= Kushiro City Museum =

Museum in Kushiro, Hokkaidō, Japan

- 釧路市立博物館
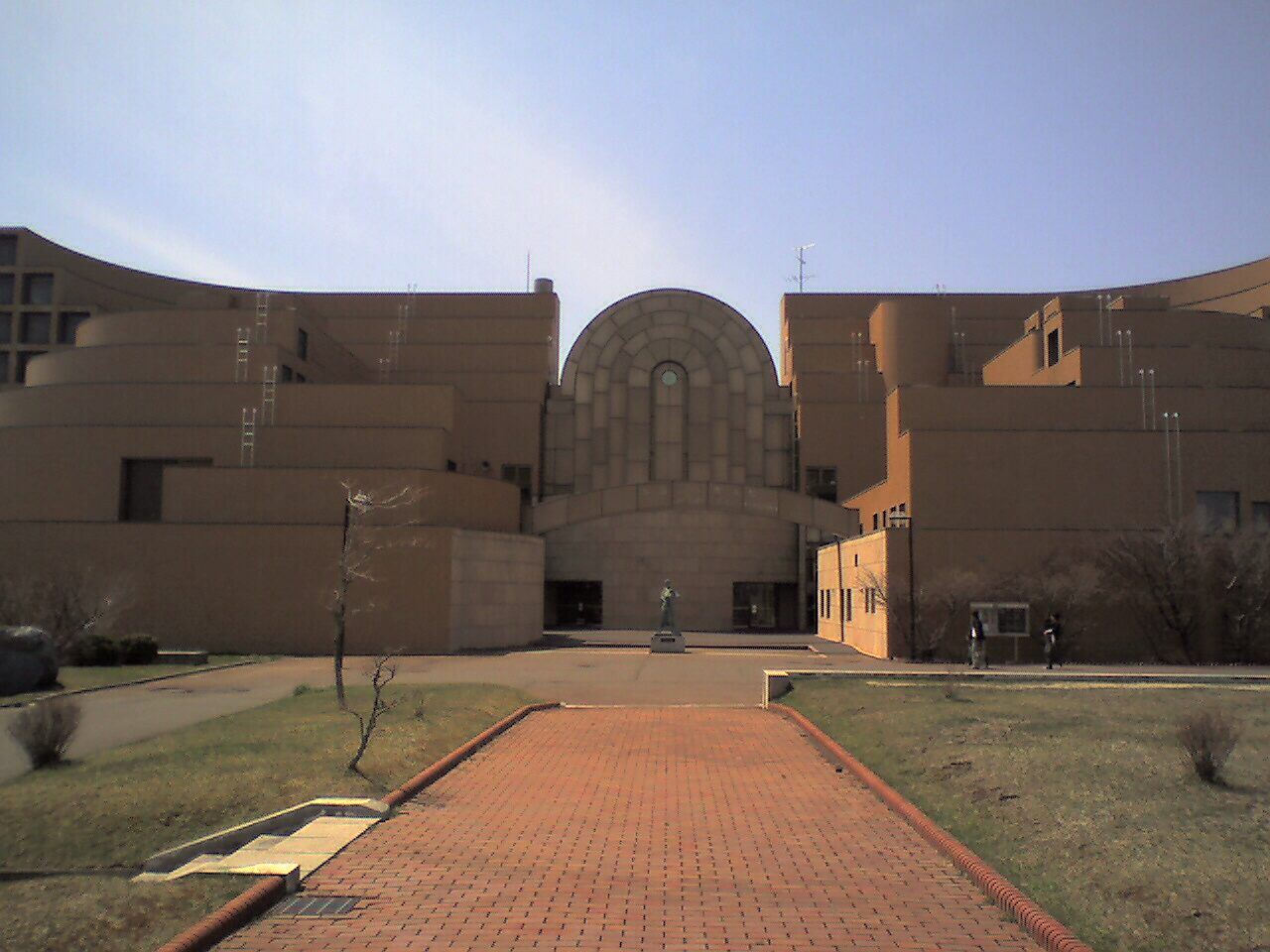
- Interactive map of the Kushiro City Museum area

General information
- Location: 1-7 Shunkodai, Kushiro, Hokkaidō, Japan
- Coordinates: 42°58′29″N 144°24′13″E
- Opened: 3 November 1983

Design and construction
- Architect: Mozuna Kikō

Website
- Official website

Kushiro City Museum (Japanese: 釧路市立博物館, Hepburn: Kushiro Shiritsu Hakubutsukan) is a registered museum in Kushiro, Hokkaidō, Japan. The Museum's predecessor institution, the Kushiro City Folk Museum (釧路市立郷土博物館), began as an exhibition room at the offices of the local water board in 1936, before moving to a department store, then from 1949 to the relocated former Kushiro City Police Station. Upon completion of the new, dedicated museum building in 1983, the museum was renamed the Kushiro City Museum. The displays centre around the geology, flora and fauna, and history of the area, with exhibits including the fossil jaw from which the Kushiro tapir [ja] (Plesiocolopirus kushiroensis) was described as well as Jōmon, Satsumon, and Ainu materials.

== See also ==
- List of Historic Sites of Japan (Hokkaidō)
- Hokkaido Museum
- Moshiriya Chashi
