= Akan District, Hokkaido =

District in Hokkaido, Japan

Akan District in Kushiro Subprefecture

Akan (阿寒郡, Akan-gun) is a district in Kushiro Subprefecture, Hokkaido, Japan. It includes Akan National Park, which has many dormant volcanoes.

== Towns and villages ==
- Tsurui 43°13′59″N 144°19′24″E

== Merger ==
- On October 11, 2005, the town of Akan, along with the town of Onbetsu (from Shiranuka District), merged into the expanded city of Kushiro.
