= Shiranuka District, Hokkaido =

District in Hokkaido, Japan

Coordinates: 43.159°N 143.918°E

Shiranuka District in Kushiro Subprefecture

Shiranuka (白糠郡, Shiranuka-gun) is a district located in western Kushiro Subprefecture, Hokkaido, Japan.

== Towns ==
- Shiranuka

== Merger ==
- On October 11, 2005, the town of Onbetsu, along with the town of Akan (from Akan District), merged into the expanded city of Kushiro.
