= National Institute of Technology, Kushiro College =

Coordinates: 43.0159°N 144.2621°E

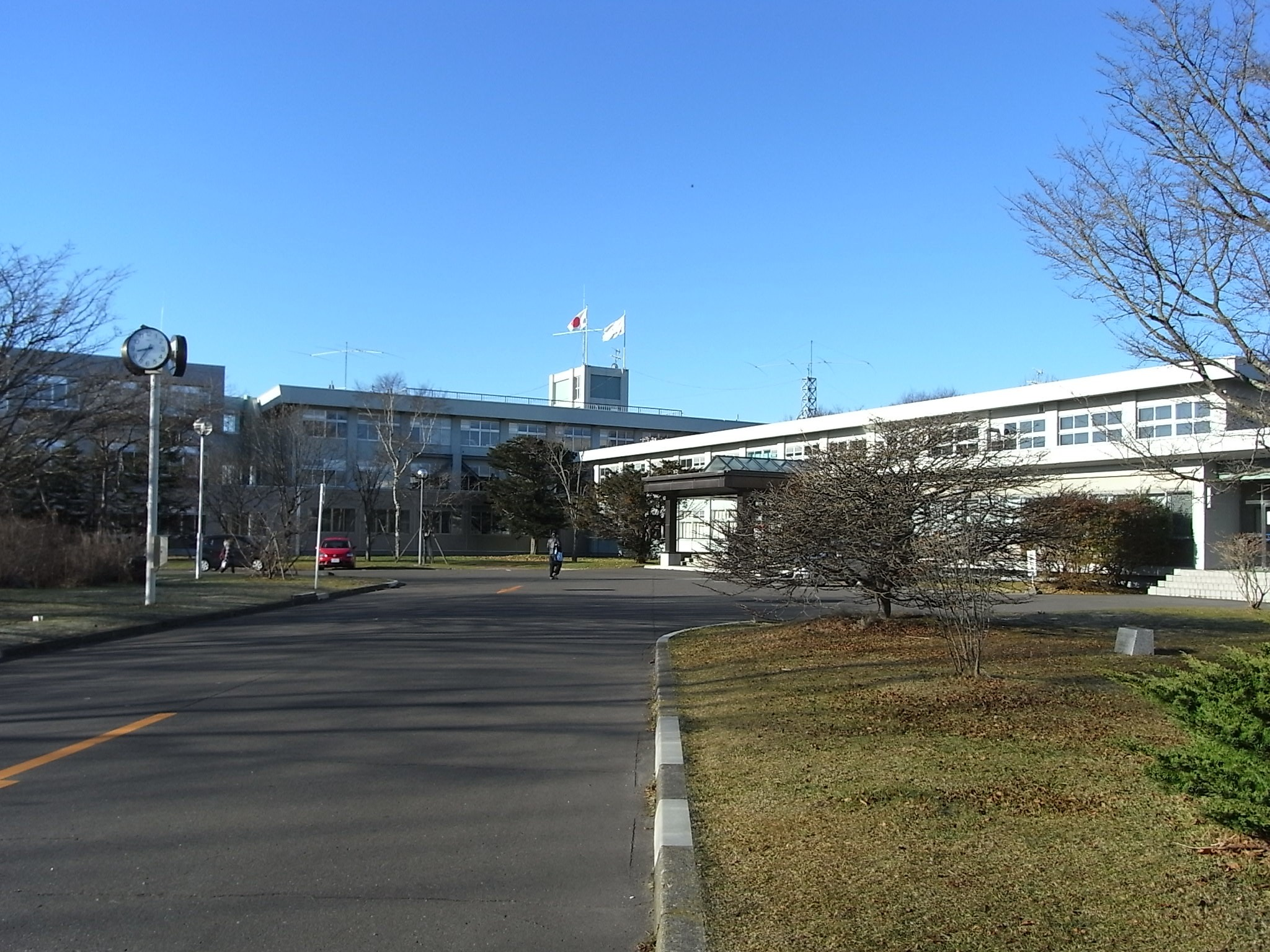
Kushiro national college of technology

Kushiro National College of Technology (Japanese: 釧路工業高等専門学校 (くしろこうぎょうこうとうせんもんがっこう) ) is a national college of technology in Kushiro, Hokkaido, Japan. It was founded in 1965.

== Departments ==
=== Department（Associate Course） ===
==== Students admitted after 2016 ====
- Department of Creative Engineering
  - Smart Mechanics Course
    - Field of Information Engineering, Field of Mechanical Engineering
  - Electronics Course
    - Field of Electrical Engineering, Field of Electronic Engineering
  - Architecture Course
    - Field of Architecture

==== Students admitted before 2015 ====
- Department of Mechanical Engineering
- Department of Electrical Engineering
- Department of Electronic Engineering
- Department of Information Engineering
- Department of Architecture

=== Advanced Course ===
- Advanced Course of Construction and Manufacturing Systems Engineering
- Advanced Course of Electronic and Information Systems Engineering

=== Library ===
The library encompasses an area of 1,550 m^{2} (16,700 sq ft) and holds about 96,764 books as of 27 February 2012. Following renovation work in 2013, it has since become barrier-free. In addition to books, the library also offers magazines, DVD, CD-ROM, etc. PCs are available for information searching. The library is open to all; be they students, faculty staff, or outsiders, allowing anyone to request book loans.

=== Cooperative Technology Center ===
Established in 2000 with the aim of supporting local industries through joint research.

=== Dormitory ===
Tsurusho Dormitory, as the dormitory on school grounds is called, has a total capacity of 431 students (336 males and 95 females) as of 2019.

Only graduate students who live outside Kushiro are allowed to stay in the dormitory, for up to 5 years.
