= Kushiro =

Kushiro 釧路市
- City
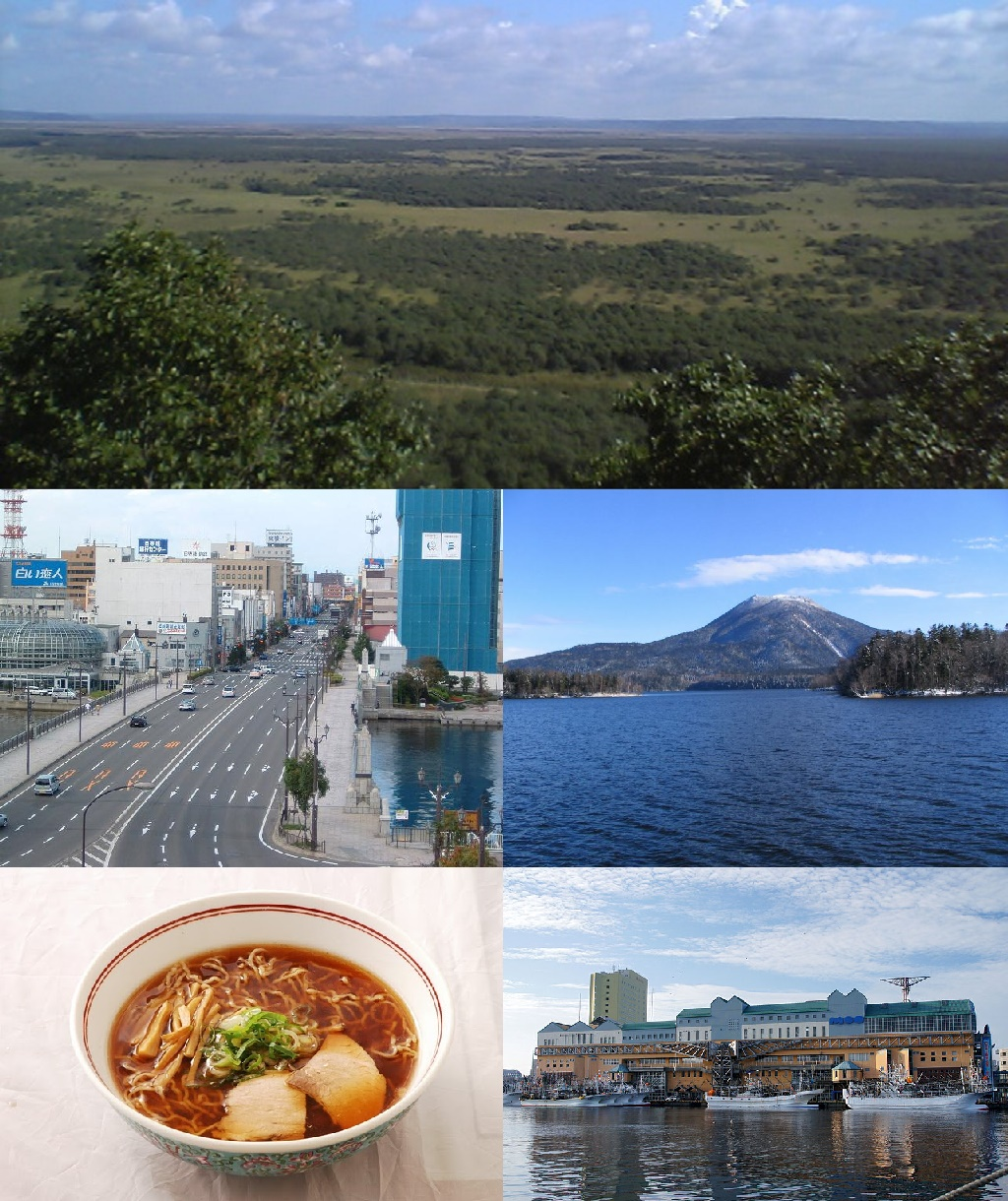
- Top：Kushiro Wetland Park; 2nd left：Nusamai Bridge, 2nd right：Lake Akan and Mount Oakan; 3rd left：Kushiro Ramen, 3rd right：Port of Kushiro

- Flag Emblem

- Location of Kushiro in Hokkaido
- Interactive map of Kushiro
- Coordinates: 42°59′6″N 144°22′54″E
- Country: Japan
- Region: Hokkaido
- Prefecture: Hokkaido (Kushiro Subprefecture)

Government
  - Mayor: Hidenori Tsuruma

Area
  - Total: 1,363.26 km^{2} (526.36 sq mi)

Population (October 31, 2025)
  - Total: 151,833
  - Density: 111.375/km^{2} (288.460/sq mi)
- Time zone: UTC+09:00 (JST)
- City hall address: 7-5 Kuroganechō, Kushiro-shi, Hokkaido 085-8505
- Website: www.city.kushiro.lg.jp
- Symbols
- Flower: Nasturtium, Lily of the valley, Ezo rindo
- Mascot: Rin-chan (りんちゃん)
- Tree: Lilac, North Japanese hill cherry, Japanese rowan

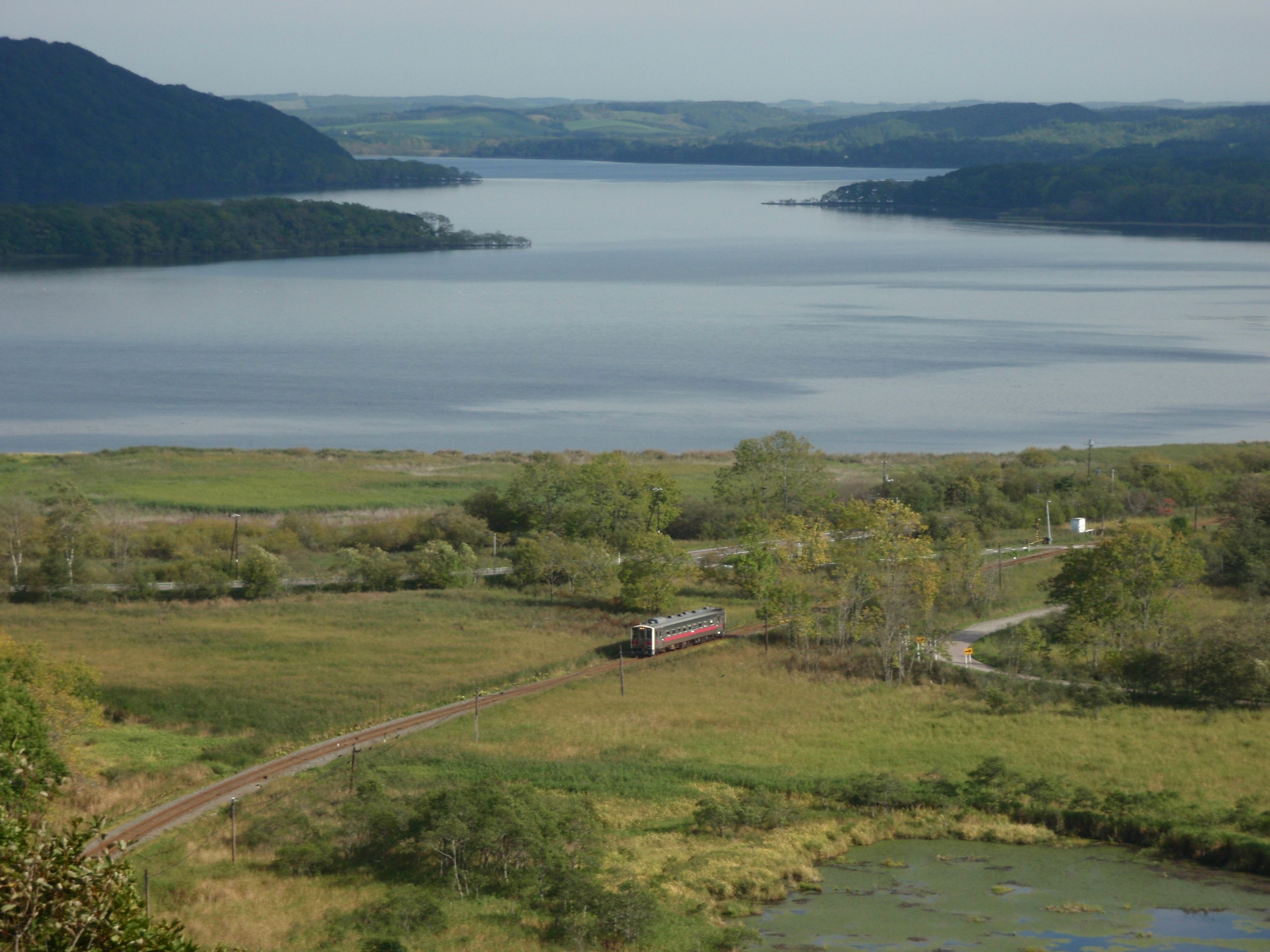
Train passing through Kushiro Wetlands, in Hokkaido, Japan

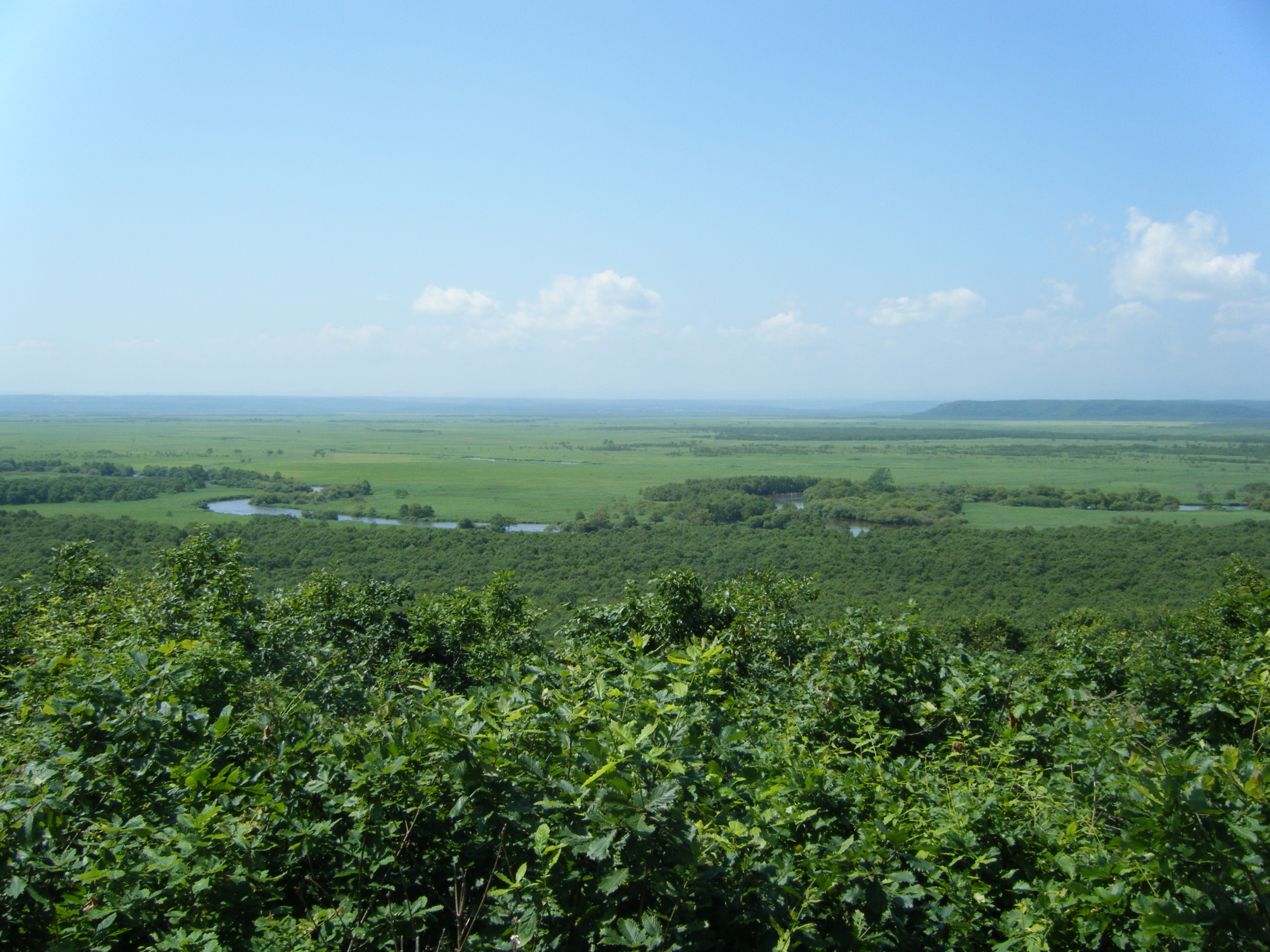
Kushiro Marsh

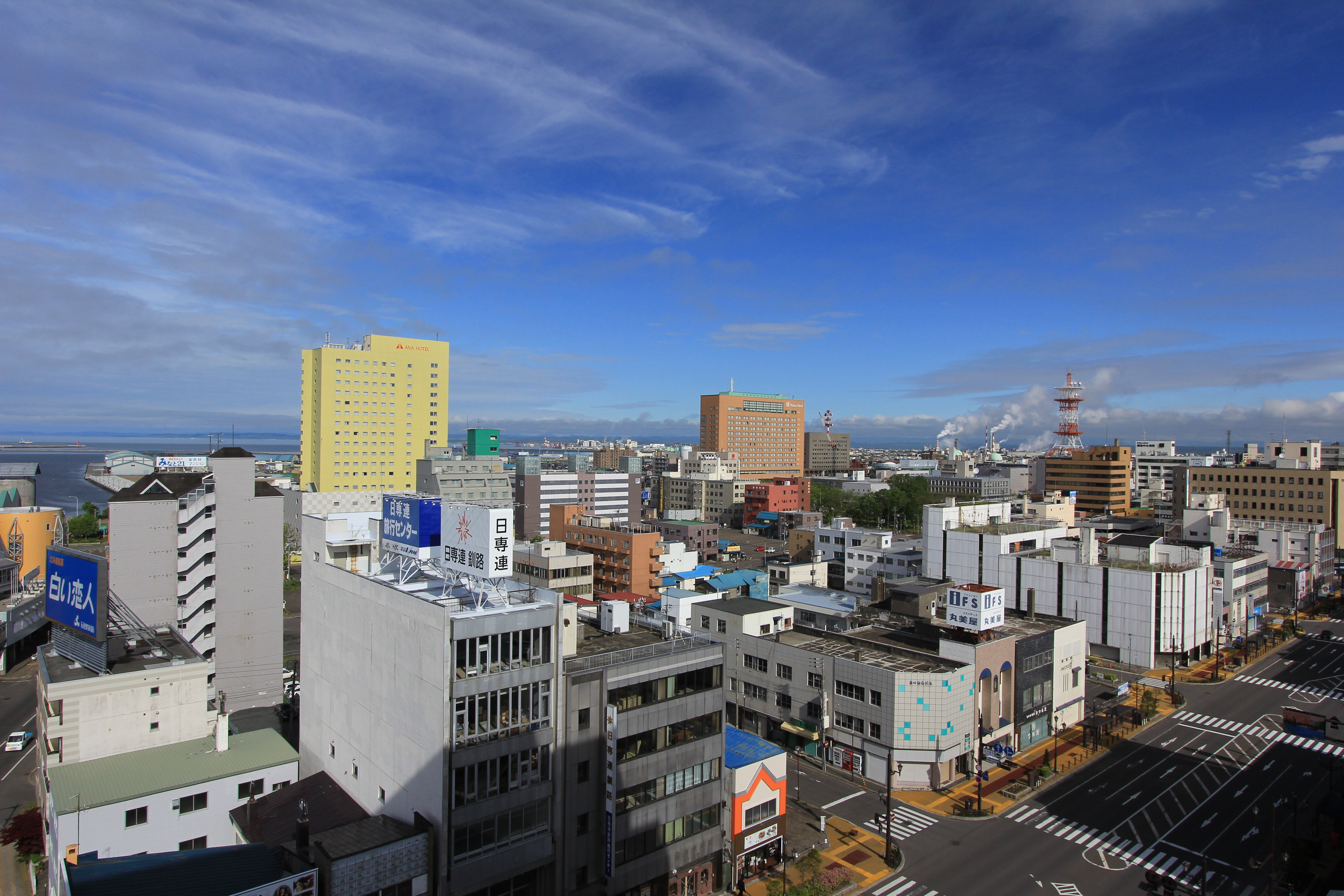
Central business district of Kushiro City

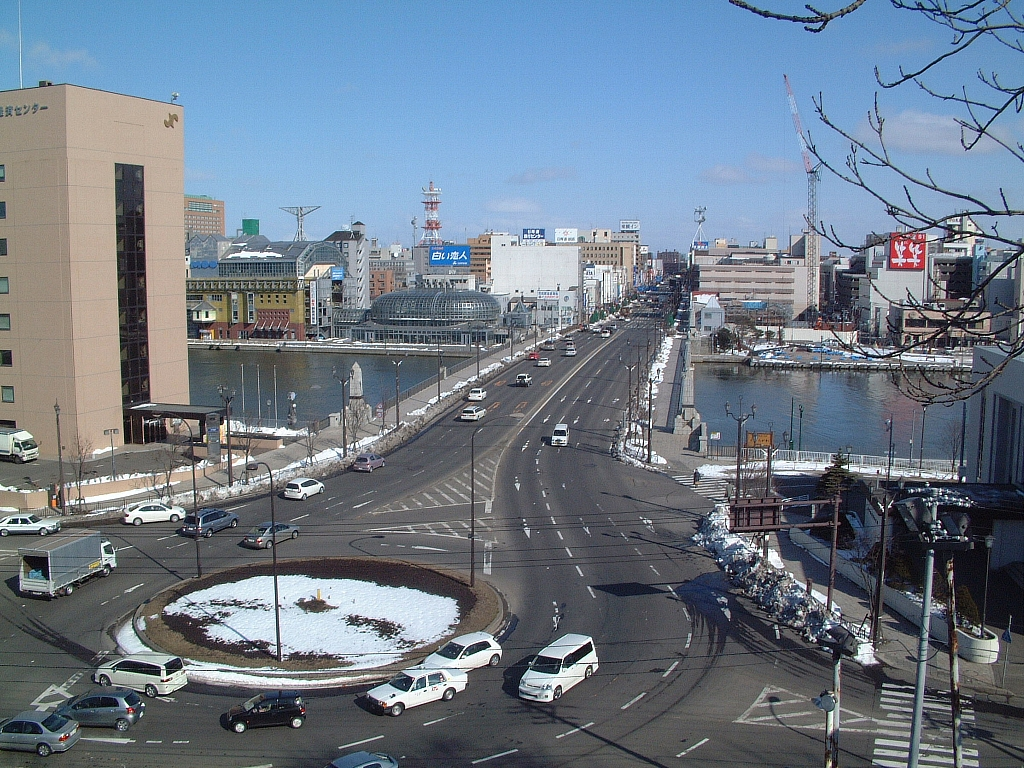
City central

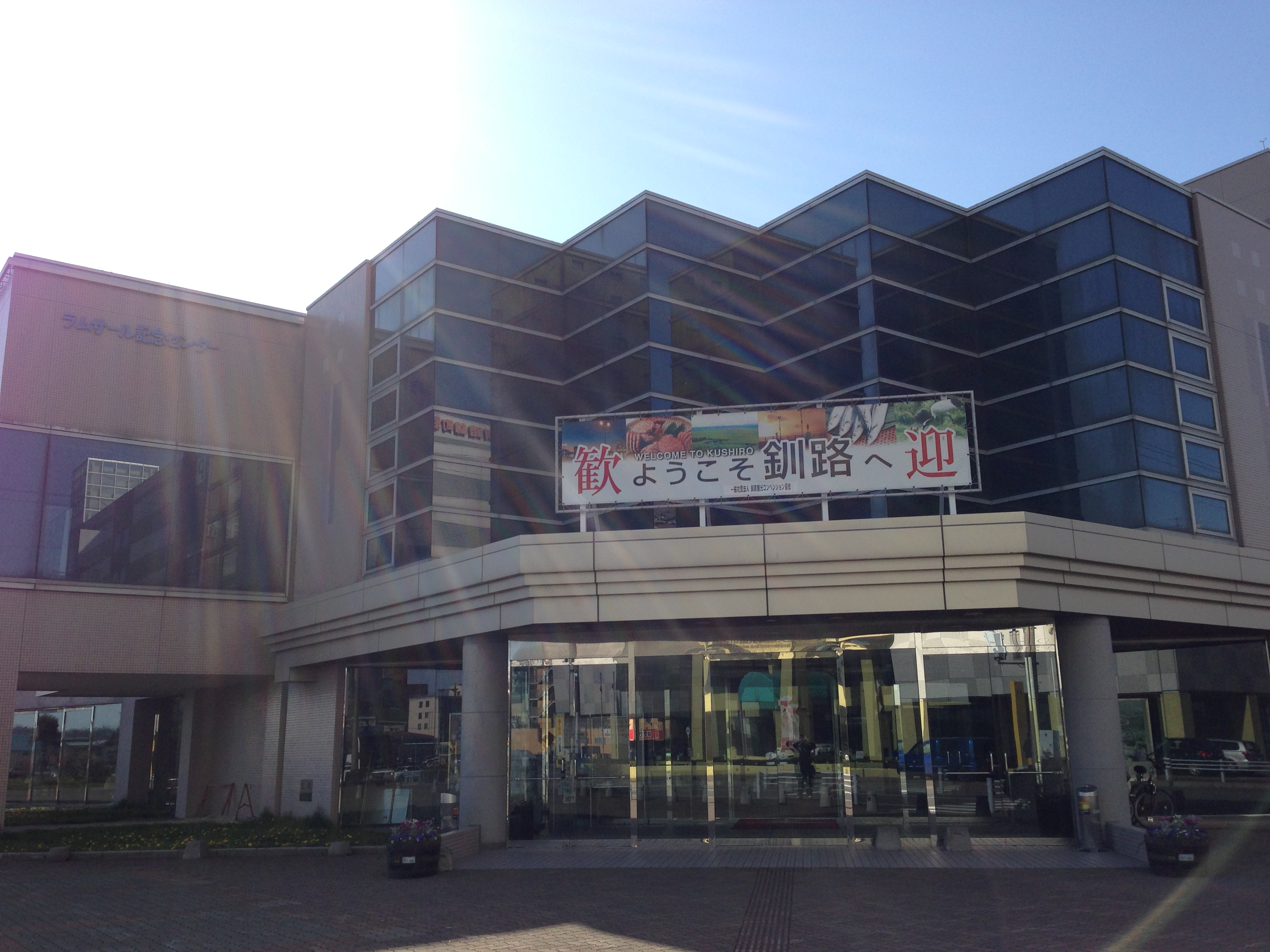
Kushiro Tourism and International Relations Center

Kushiro (釧路市, Kushiro-shi; Japanese pronunciation: [kɯ̥̈.ɕí.ɾò̞, -ɕì.ɾò̞, -ɕí.ɾó̞.ɕì]) is a city in Kushiro Subprefecture on the island of Hokkaido, Japan. Located along the coast of the North Pacific Ocean, it serves as the subprefecture's capital and it is the most populated city in the eastern part of the island. As of 31 October 2025, the city had an estimated population of 151,833 in 90771 households, and a population density of 111 people per km^{2}. The total area of the city is 1,363.26 km^{2} (526.36 sq mi).

== Geography ==
Kushiro is located in southeastern Hokkaido. The Kushiro River and Akan River flow through the city, as well as Lake Akan is within the city borders. Following a merger in 2005, the former town of Onbetsu is an enclave to the west of the main city. The northeastern portion of Kushiro borders Kushiro-shitsugen National Park.

=== Mountains ===
- Mount Akan-Fuji
- Mount Meakan
- Mount Oakan

=== Rivers ===
- Akan River
- Kushiro River
- Shitakara River

=== Lakes ===
- Lake Akan
- Lake Harutori
- Lake Panketō
- Lake Penketō
- Lake Shunkushitakara

=== Neighboring municipalities ===
- Shiranuka
- Kushiro Town
- Shibecha
- Teshikaga
- Ashoro
- Urahoro
- Tsubetsu

== Climate ==
Kushiro has a humid continental climate (Dfb) but its winter temperatures are less severe than those of inland East Asia at the same latitude. Its port is the most reliably ice-free throughout winter in all of Hokkaido, due to the lack of indentation in the coastline and absence of large inflows of cold fresh water nearby. It is also markedly sunnier than the extremely gloomy Kuril Islands to its north, being sheltered by Hokkaido's mountains from the heavy snowfalls produced on the Sea of Japan side by the Aleutian Low. It receives only a third as much snowfall as Sapporo and almost twice as much sunshine as the Kuril Islands are estimated to. Its daytime summer temperatures are noticeably cooler than in the interior, sheltered coastal areas and the south coast of Hokkaido.

Climate data for Kushiro (elevation 4.5 m, 1991–2020 normals, extremes 1889–present)
Month	Jan	Feb	Mar	Apr	May	Jun	Jul	Aug	Sep	Oct	Nov	Dec	Year
Record high °C (°F)	7.6 (45.7)	11.0 (51.8)	15.9 (60.6)	23.5 (74.3)	28.0 (82.4)	32.4 (90.3)	33.5 (92.3)	31.1 (88.0)	29.6 (85.3)	23.7 (74.7)	18.7 (65.7)	12.4 (54.3)	33.5 (92.3)
Mean maximum °C (°F)	4.6 (40.3)	5.1 (41.2)	9.6 (49.3)	15.6 (60.1)	20.6 (69.1)	23.2 (73.8)	26.0 (78.8)	27.7 (81.9)	25.4 (77.7)	20.2 (68.4)	14.8 (58.6)	8.9 (48.0)	28.2 (82.8)
Mean daily maximum °C (°F)	−0.2 (31.6)	−0.1 (31.8)	3.3 (37.9)	8.0 (46.4)	12.6 (54.7)	15.8 (60.4)	19.6 (67.3)	21.5 (70.7)	20.1 (68.2)	15.1 (59.2)	8.9 (48.0)	2.5 (36.5)	10.6 (51.1)
Daily mean °C (°F)	−4.8 (23.4)	−4.3 (24.3)	−0.4 (31.3)	4.0 (39.2)	8.6 (47.5)	12.2 (54.0)	16.1 (61.0)	18.2 (64.8)	16.5 (61.7)	11.0 (51.8)	4.7 (40.5)	−1.9 (28.6)	6.7 (44.1)
Mean daily minimum °C (°F)	−9.8 (14.4)	−9.4 (15.1)	−4.2 (24.4)	0.7 (33.3)	5.4 (41.7)	9.5 (49.1)	13.6 (56.5)	15.7 (60.3)	12.9 (55.2)	6.1 (43.0)	−0.3 (31.5)	−7.0 (19.4)	2.8 (37.0)
Mean minimum °C (°F)	−17.3 (0.9)	−17.6 (0.3)	−11.7 (10.9)	−4.2 (24.4)	0.3 (32.5)	4.9 (40.8)	9.7 (49.5)	11.5 (52.7)	5.9 (42.6)	−0.9 (30.4)	−7.5 (18.5)	−14.0 (6.8)	−18.5 (−1.3)
Record low °C (°F)	−34.5 (−30.1)	−31.6 (−24.9)	−28.9 (−20.0)	−17.5 (0.5)	−7.2 (19.0)	−3.7 (25.3)	−0.7 (30.7)	1.4 (34.5)	−4.2 (24.4)	−11.1 (12.0)	−17.4 (0.7)	−30.7 (−23.3)	−34.5 (−30.1)
Average precipitation mm (inches)	40.4 (1.59)	24.8 (0.98)	55.9 (2.20)	79.4 (3.13)	115.7 (4.56)	114.2 (4.50)	120.3 (4.74)	142.3 (5.60)	153.0 (6.02)	112.7 (4.44)	64.7 (2.55)	56.6 (2.23)	1,080.1 (42.52)
Average snowfall cm (inches)	32 (13)	27 (11)	31 (12)	7 (2.8)	0 (0)	0 (0)	0 (0)	0 (0)	0 (0)	0 (0)	4 (1.6)	26 (10)	127 (50)
Average precipitation days (≥ 0.5 mm)	6.4	5.6	8.1	9.8	11.3	10.2	11.5	11.8	11.8	8.7	8.0	7.7	110.8
Average snowy days	14.3	13.9	15.1	9.8	1.4	0.0	0.0	0.0	0.0	1.0	5.7	12.6	74.3
Average relative humidity (%)	67	69	71	77	80	87	88	87	84	76	69	67	77
Mean monthly sunshine hours	186.7	183.1	200.8	182.2	177.5	126.8	118.9	117.6	143.9	177.0	167.6	175.6	1,957.6
Source: Japan Meteorological Agency (1991–2020 normals, extremes 1889–present)

Climate data for Nakateshibetsu, Kushiro (elevation 80 m, 1991–2020 normals, extremes 1977–present)
Month	Jan	Feb	Mar	Apr	May	Jun	Jul	Aug	Sep	Oct	Nov	Dec	Year
Record high °C (°F)	9.0 (48.2)	15.6 (60.1)	17.8 (64.0)	31.0 (87.8)	36.1 (97.0)	33.7 (92.7)	36.6 (97.9)	36.1 (97.0)	33.1 (91.6)	28.1 (82.6)	22.9 (73.2)	14.3 (57.7)	36.6 (97.9)
Mean daily maximum °C (°F)	−0.8 (30.6)	−0.2 (31.6)	3.9 (39.0)	10.7 (51.3)	16.6 (61.9)	19.7 (67.5)	23.0 (73.4)	24.3 (75.7)	21.3 (70.3)	16.0 (60.8)	8.9 (48.0)	1.7 (35.1)	12.1 (53.8)
Daily mean °C (°F)	−7.8 (18.0)	−7.2 (19.0)	−2.1 (28.2)	3.9 (39.0)	9.6 (49.3)	13.6 (56.5)	17.5 (63.5)	18.8 (65.8)	15.3 (59.5)	8.9 (48.0)	2.0 (35.6)	−5.0 (23.0)	5.7 (42.3)
Mean daily minimum °C (°F)	−15.3 (4.5)	−15.2 (4.6)	−8.9 (16.0)	−2.5 (27.5)	3.1 (37.6)	8.5 (47.3)	13.3 (55.9)	14.7 (58.5)	10.1 (50.2)	2.2 (36.0)	−4.4 (24.1)	−11.8 (10.8)	−0.5 (31.1)
Record low °C (°F)	−28.8 (−19.8)	−28.8 (−19.8)	−22.9 (−9.2)	−14.0 (6.8)	−8.0 (17.6)	−2.8 (27.0)	1.2 (34.2)	3.9 (39.0)	−2.1 (28.2)	−9.1 (15.6)	−15.2 (4.6)	−25.7 (−14.3)	−28.8 (−19.8)
Average precipitation mm (inches)	54.8 (2.16)	34.9 (1.37)	72.2 (2.84)	96.4 (3.80)	139.2 (5.48)	111.5 (4.39)	130.8 (5.15)	176.3 (6.94)	178.5 (7.03)	132.8 (5.23)	80.5 (3.17)	72.3 (2.85)	1,277.5 (50.30)
Average snowfall cm (inches)	86 (34)	75 (30)	84 (33)	20 (7.9)	1 (0.4)	0 (0)	0 (0)	0 (0)	0 (0)	0 (0)	8 (3.1)	67 (26)	342 (135)
Average precipitation days (≥ 1.0 mm)	5.7	5.3	8.0	9.4	11.0	10.2	11.6	12.5	12.0	9.5	8.2	7.1	110.3
Mean monthly sunshine hours	167.1	152.4	175.4	170.9	176.4	146.1	117.9	124.1	135.3	164.5	159.3	160.0	1,847.7
Source: Japan Meteorological Agency (1991–2020 normals, extremes 1977–present)

Climate data for Akankohan, Kushiro (elevation 426 m, 1991–2020 normals, extremes 1977–present)
Month	Jan	Feb	Mar	Apr	May	Jun	Jul	Aug	Sep	Oct	Nov	Dec	Year
Record high °C (°F)	6.2 (43.2)	13.7 (56.7)	16.5 (61.7)	28.3 (82.9)	35.5 (95.9)	34.5 (94.1)	34.9 (94.8)	33.9 (93.0)	31.4 (88.5)	28.1 (82.6)	19.0 (66.2)	11.8 (53.2)	35.5 (95.9)
Mean daily maximum °C (°F)	−4.2 (24.4)	−3.1 (26.4)	1.4 (34.5)	8.1 (46.6)	15.1 (59.2)	18.9 (66.0)	22.3 (72.1)	22.8 (73.0)	19.0 (66.2)	13.2 (55.8)	5.8 (42.4)	−1.4 (29.5)	9.8 (49.6)
Daily mean °C (°F)	−10.0 (14.0)	−9.4 (15.1)	−4.2 (24.4)	2.3 (36.1)	8.5 (47.3)	13.1 (55.6)	17.1 (62.8)	18.0 (64.4)	14.0 (57.2)	7.5 (45.5)	0.7 (33.3)	−6.5 (20.3)	4.3 (39.7)
Mean daily minimum °C (°F)	−16.7 (1.9)	−16.8 (1.8)	−10.8 (12.6)	−3.3 (26.1)	2.3 (36.1)	8.0 (46.4)	12.9 (55.2)	13.9 (57.0)	9.3 (48.7)	2.1 (35.8)	−4.3 (24.3)	−12.1 (10.2)	−1.3 (29.7)
Record low °C (°F)	−30.2 (−22.4)	−30.7 (−23.3)	−26.6 (−15.9)	−20.9 (−5.6)	−7.5 (18.5)	−3.3 (26.1)	1.8 (35.2)	3.2 (37.8)	−1.2 (29.8)	−7.6 (18.3)	−17.3 (0.9)	−26.9 (−16.4)	−30.7 (−23.3)
Average precipitation mm (inches)	63.2 (2.49)	44.5 (1.75)	70.2 (2.76)	90.8 (3.57)	105.7 (4.16)	84.4 (3.32)	103.2 (4.06)	160.0 (6.30)	165.7 (6.52)	137.8 (5.43)	85.2 (3.35)	87.4 (3.44)	1,197.9 (47.16)
Average snowfall cm (inches)	132 (52)	96 (38)	105 (41)	54 (21)	3 (1.2)	0 (0)	0 (0)	0 (0)	0 (0)	1 (0.4)	31 (12)	123 (48)	548 (216)
Average precipitation days (≥ 1.0 mm)	10.2	8.9	11.5	11.3	11.0	10.1	10.4	11.4	12.0	10.5	9.8	9.8	127.0
Mean monthly sunshine hours	97.5	111.9	137.1	154.0	169.4	146.3	132.2	115.7	110.1	123.3	110.6	107.3	1,546
Source: Japan Meteorological Agency (1991–2020 normals, extremes 1977–present)

== History ==
The origins of Kushiro Port are said to date back to the mid-17th century, when Matsumae Domain sent trading ships to trade with the Ainu people who lived near the mouth of the Kushiro River. During the Edo period, Kushiro Port was called Kusuri-tomari. Around 1799 Itsukushima Jinja was founded by the Tokugawa shogunate. In 1869 the name of the settlement was changed from "Kusuri" to "Kushiro." In 1897 Yasuda Coal Mine opened. An Imperial decree in July 1899 established Kushiro as an open port for trading with the United States and the United Kingdom. On 10 July 1900, with the implementation of the Hokkaido First- and Second-Class Municipalities System, Kushiro Town, Kushiro District, was established.

Kushiro was an important port because it is more reliably ice-free during winter than alternative Russian Far East warm-water ports such as Petropavlovsk-Kamchatsky or other ports in Hokkaido such as Hakodate, which occasionally freeze for short periods due to the lower salinity of the Sea of Japan. For this reason, Kushiro was considered a valuable target during the Russo-Japanese Wars. Its importance grew during the 1920s with the growth of commercial fishing, for which its reliable freedom from ice reduced costs. Kushiro was accorded city status on August 1, 1922.

On July 14–15, 1945 the city of Kushiro was bombed by American naval aircraft; resulting in 192 mostly civilian deaths, 1,618 houses burned or destroyed, 6,211 people affected, and 273 people injured. The city center was reduced to a burnt wasteland. Following the Invasion of the Kuril Islands in August 1945, Kushiro was favoured by the Russians as the eastern cornerstone of a border between an American-occupied south and a Soviet-occupied north-coupled with Rumoi as the western cornerstone. However, these plans were cancelled after pressure by US President Harry S. Truman.

In October 1949, the neighboring town of Tottori was incorporated into Kushiro City. On March 4, 1952, the Tokachi-oki earthquake occurred, resulting in 15 deaths. A gas explosion at the Kushiro Mine of the Pacific Coal Mine occurred on August 31, 1954, killing 39 workers.

On October 11, 2005, the town of Akan, from Akan District, and the town of Onbetsu, from Shiranuka District, was merged into Kushiro. The town of Shiranuka now lies between the two sections of Kushiro.

== Government ==
Kushiro has a mayor-council form of government with a directly elected mayor and a unicameral city council of 28 members. Kushiro contributes four members to the Hokkaidō Prefectural Assembly. In terms of national politics, the city is part of the Hokkaidō 7th district of the lower house of the Diet of Japan.

== Economy ==
Kushiro is a regional commercial center. In terms of industry, paper and pulp, agriculture, commercial fishing and food processing and the chemicals industry are major contributors.

Avenue Kushiro, also known as Avenue 946, was a shopping centre near Kushiro Station that closed on 31 August 2016.

== Education ==
Kushiro has 24 public elementary schools, 13 public middle schools, one public combined elementary/middle school and two public high schools operated by the city. The city has six public high schools operated by the Hokkaido Board of Education and one private high school. The prefecture also operates two special education schools for the handicapped. In terms of higher education, the Kushiro Junior College, National Institute of Technology, Kushiro College and the Kushiro Public University of Economics are located in the city.

=== Public high schools ===
- Hokkaido Akan High School (Municipal)
- Hokkaido Kushiro Commercial High School
- Hokkaido Kushiro Hokuyo High School
- Hokkaido Kushiro Konan High School
- Hokkaido Kushiro Koryo High School
- Hokkaido Kushiro Meiki High School
- Hokkaido Kushiro Technical High School

=== Private high schools ===
- Bushukan High School
- Ikegami Gakuen High School, Kushiro Campus

== Transportation ==
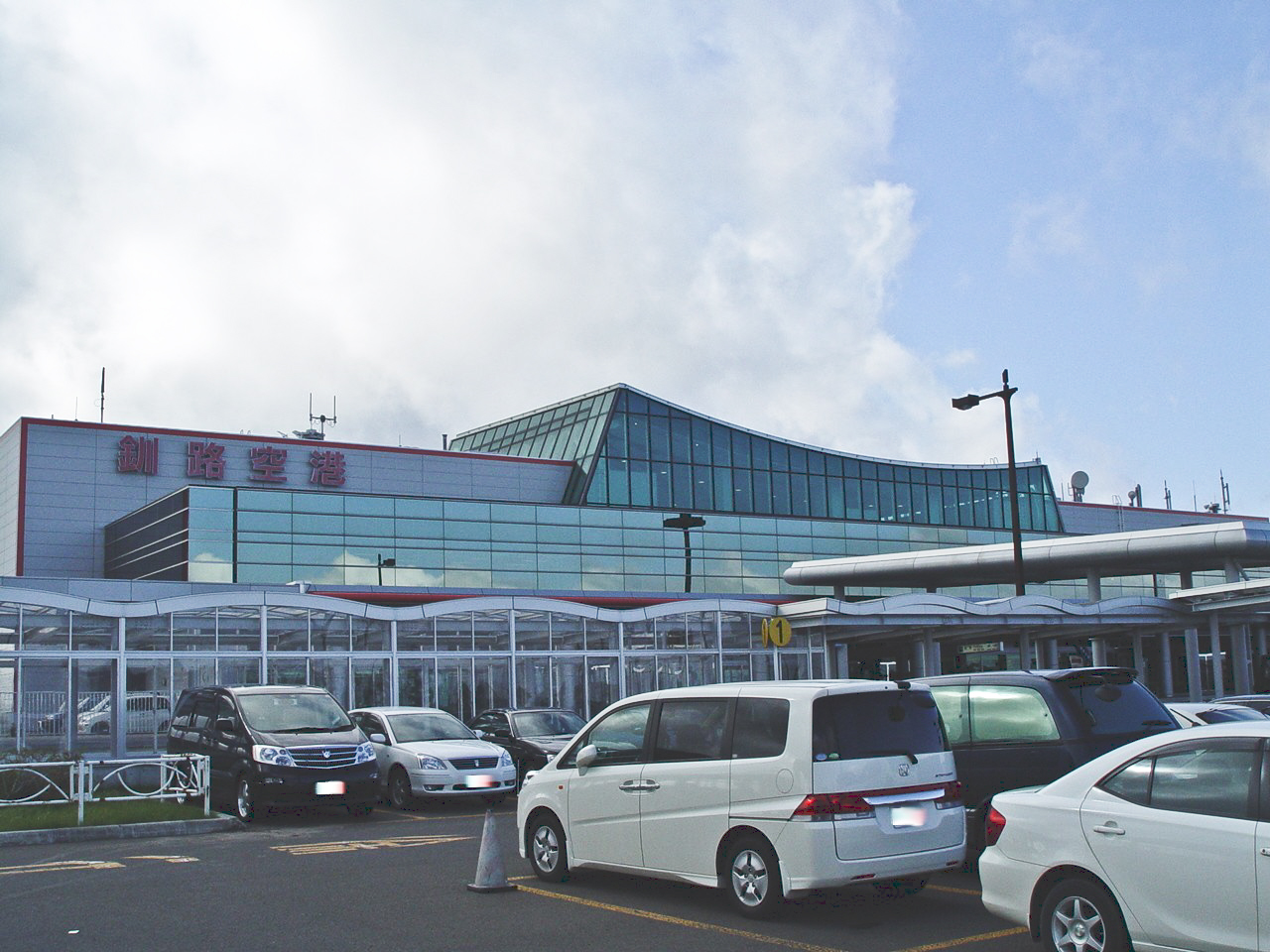
Kushiro Airport

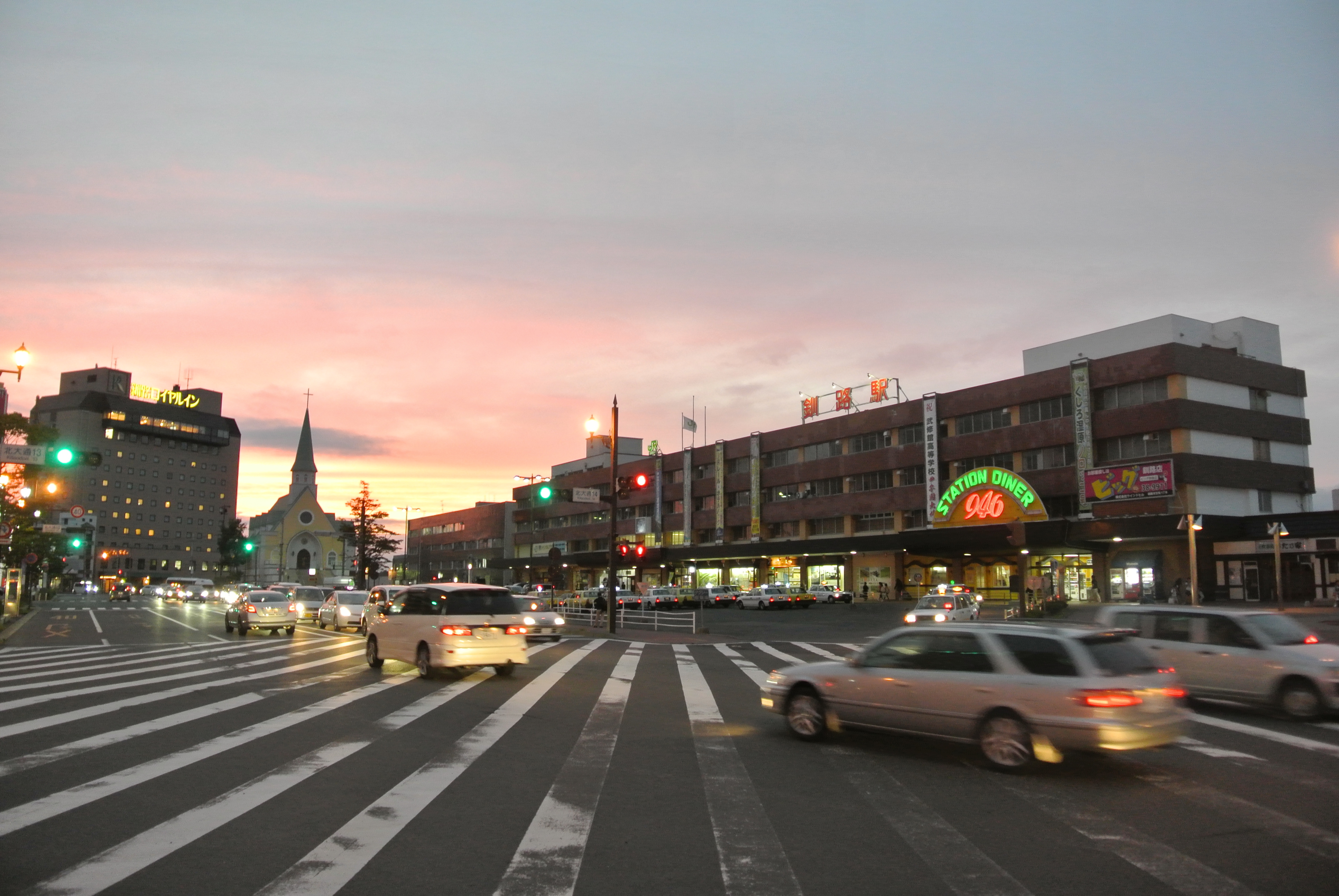
Kushiro Station

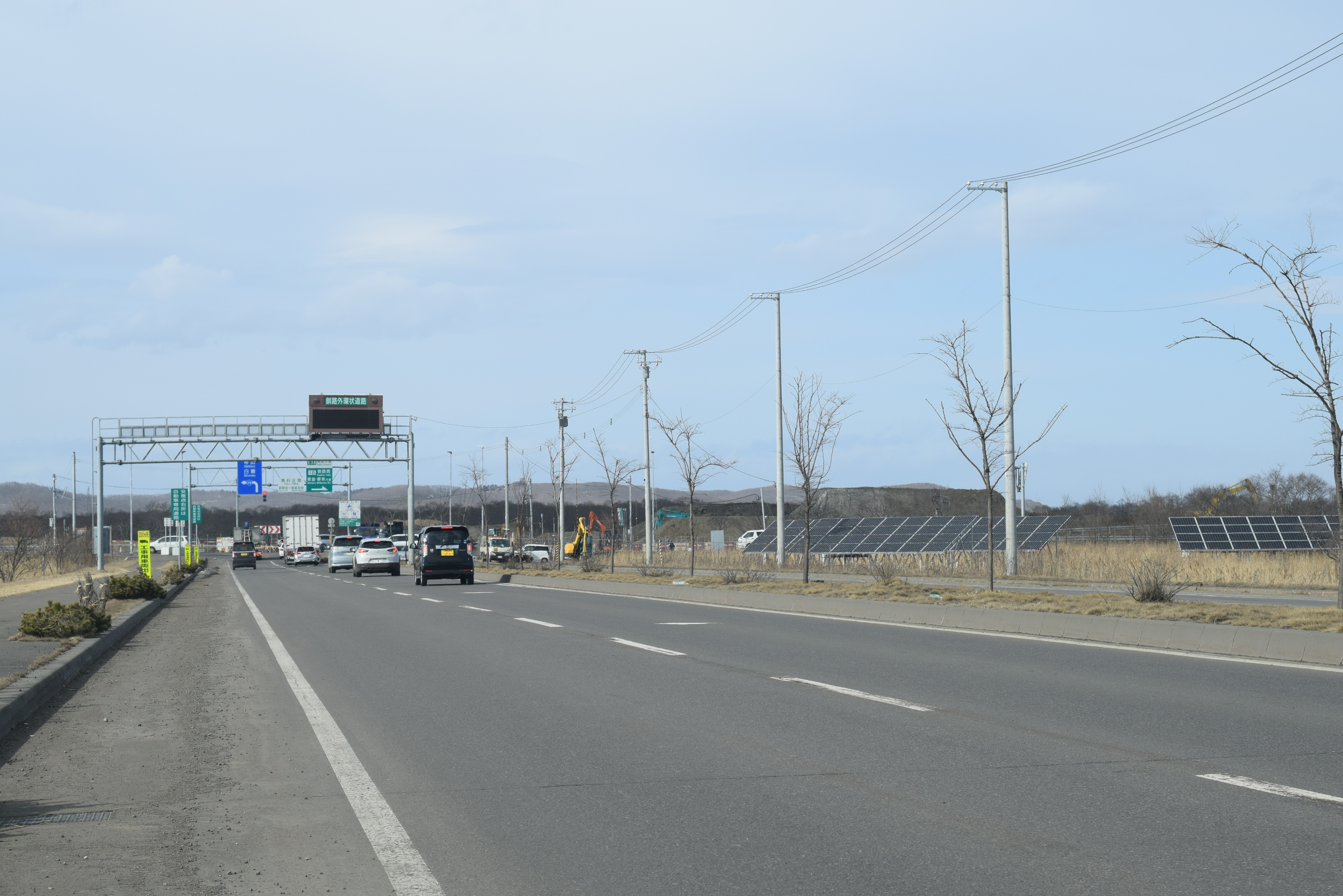
Kushiro-nishi IC

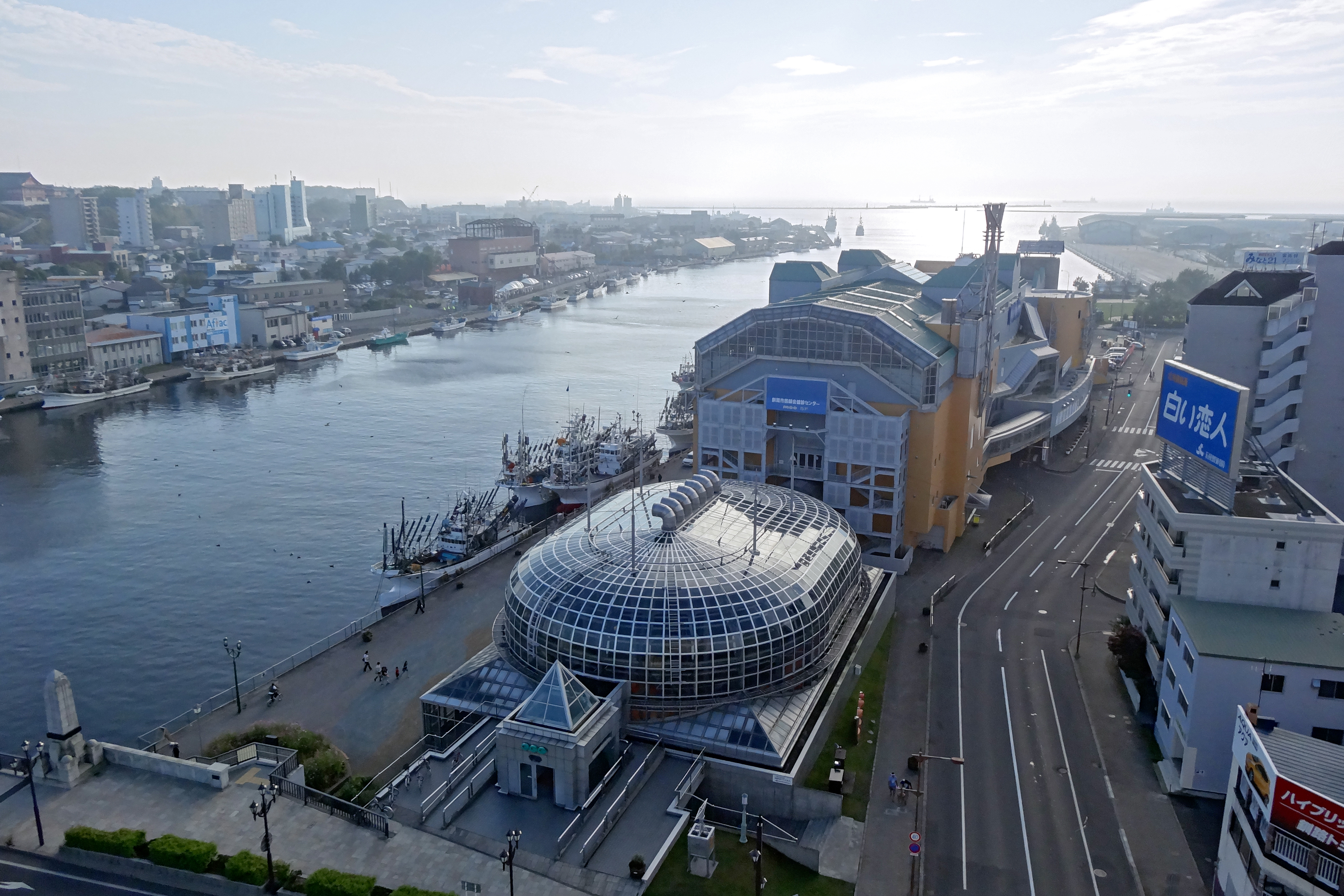
Port of Kushiro

=== Airport ===
- Kushiro Airport

=== Railways ===
JR Hokkaido - Nemuro Main Line

■ Onbetsu - <Shiranuka> - Otanoshike - Shin-Otanoshike - Shin-Fuji - Kushiro - Higashi-Kushiro - Musa

JR Hokkaido - Senmō Main Line

■ Higashi-Kushiro

JR Freight

- Nemuro Main Line: Kushiro Freight Terminal

Taiheiyō Coal Services

- Rinkō Line

=== Highways ===
- Dōtō Expressway
- Kushiro Sotokan Road
- National Route 38
- National Route 44
- National Route 240
- National Route 241
- National Route 274
- National Route 391

==== Ports ====
- Port of Kushiro

== Sister cities ==
=== International ===
Sister cities

City	Country	State	since
Burnaby	Canada	British Columbia	1965
Kholmsk	Russia	Sakhalin Oblast	1975

Partner cities

City	Country	State	since
Petropavlovsk-Kamchatsky	Russia	Kamchatka Krai	1998

=== Domestic ===
Sister cities

City	Prefecture	region	since
Yuzawa	(Akita Prefecture) Akita	Tōhoku region	October 4, 1963
Tottori	(Tottori Prefecture) Tottori	Chūgoku region	October 4, 1963
Okayama	(Okayama Prefecture) Okayama	Chūgoku region	October 9, 1980

Partner cities

City	Prefecture	region	since
Yachiyo	(Chiba Prefecture) Chiba	Kantō region	1982
Izumi	(Kagoshima Prefecture) Kagoshima	Kyushu region	August 22, 1989
Tsuru	(Yamanashi Prefecture) Yamanashi	Chūbu region	September 1, 1992
Naka (Naka District)	(Tokushima Prefecture) Tokushima	Shikoku region	September 2, 2006

=== Sister ports ===
Port of Kushiro's sister ports are:

- Port of New Orleans, Louisiana, United States (since 1984)
- Port Stephens, New South Wales, Australia (since 1994)

== Local attractions ==
- Itsukushima Jinja
- Kushiro Wetland Park
- Kushiro City Museum
- Lake Akan
  - Lake Akan Kotan
- Manabot Nusamai
  - Kushiro City Museum of Art
- Moshiriya Chashi (Castle)
- Tottori Jinja

=== National parks ===
- Akan National Park
- Kushiro-shitsugen National Park
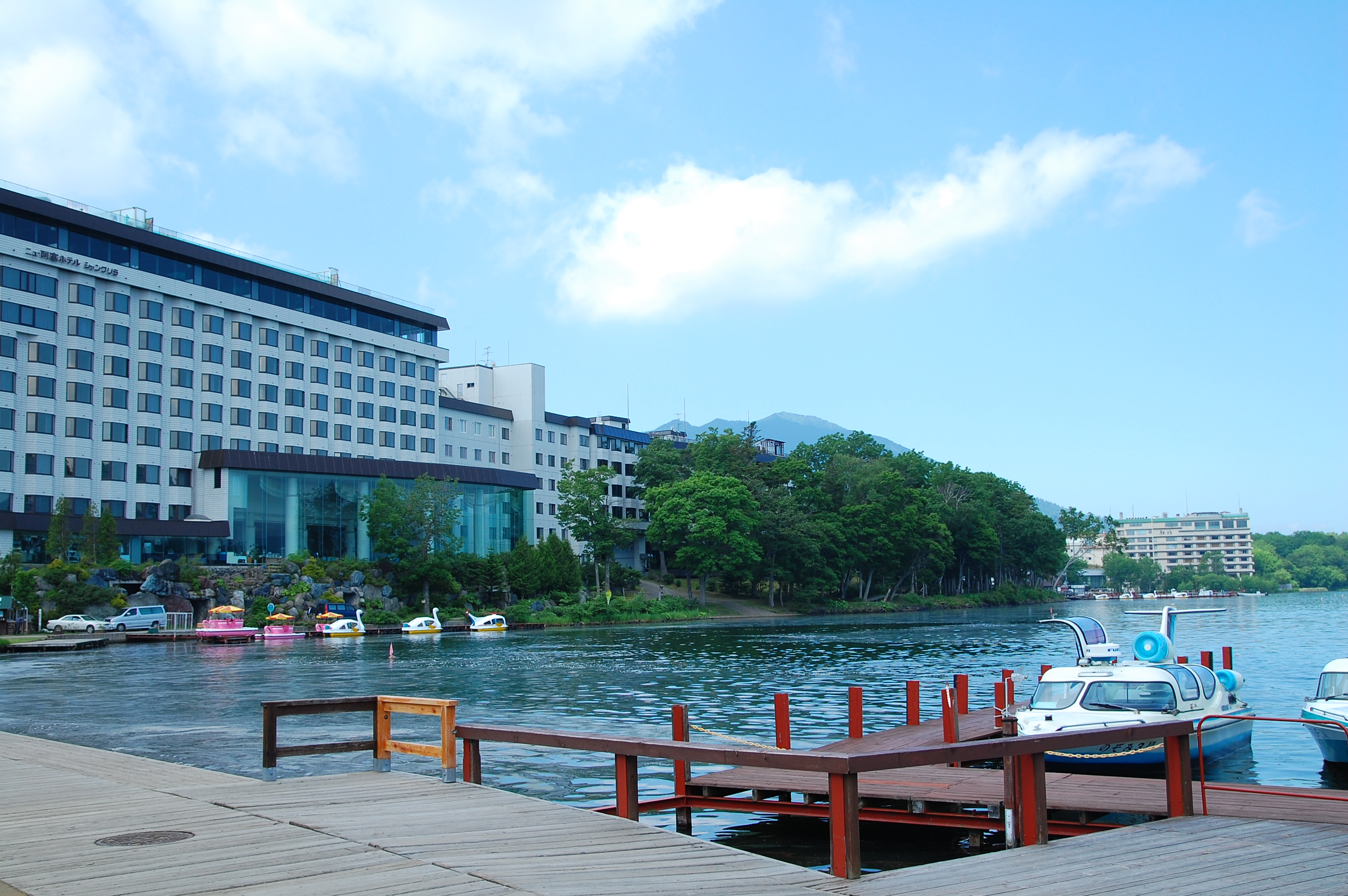
Lake Akan

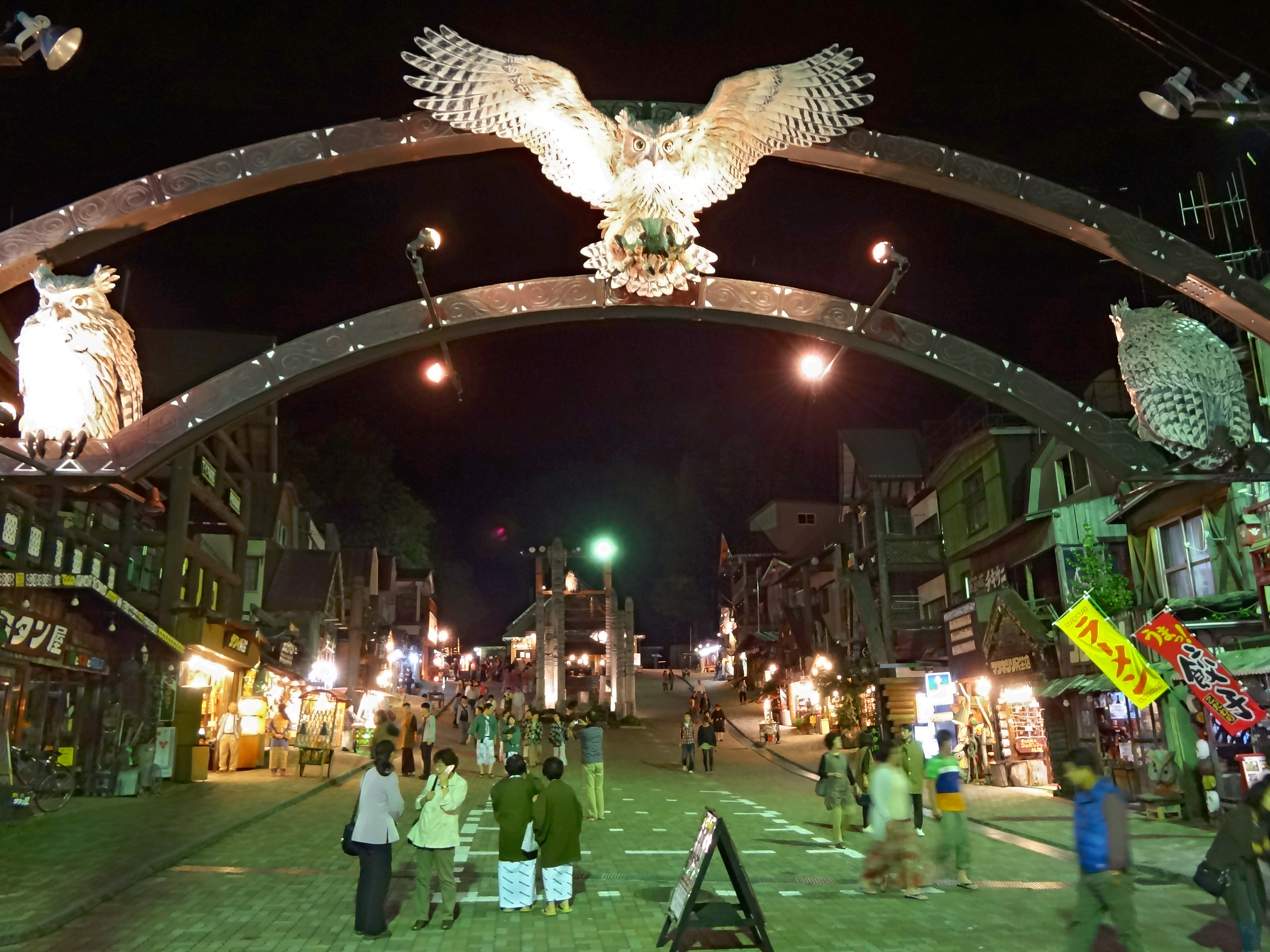
Lake Akan Kotan

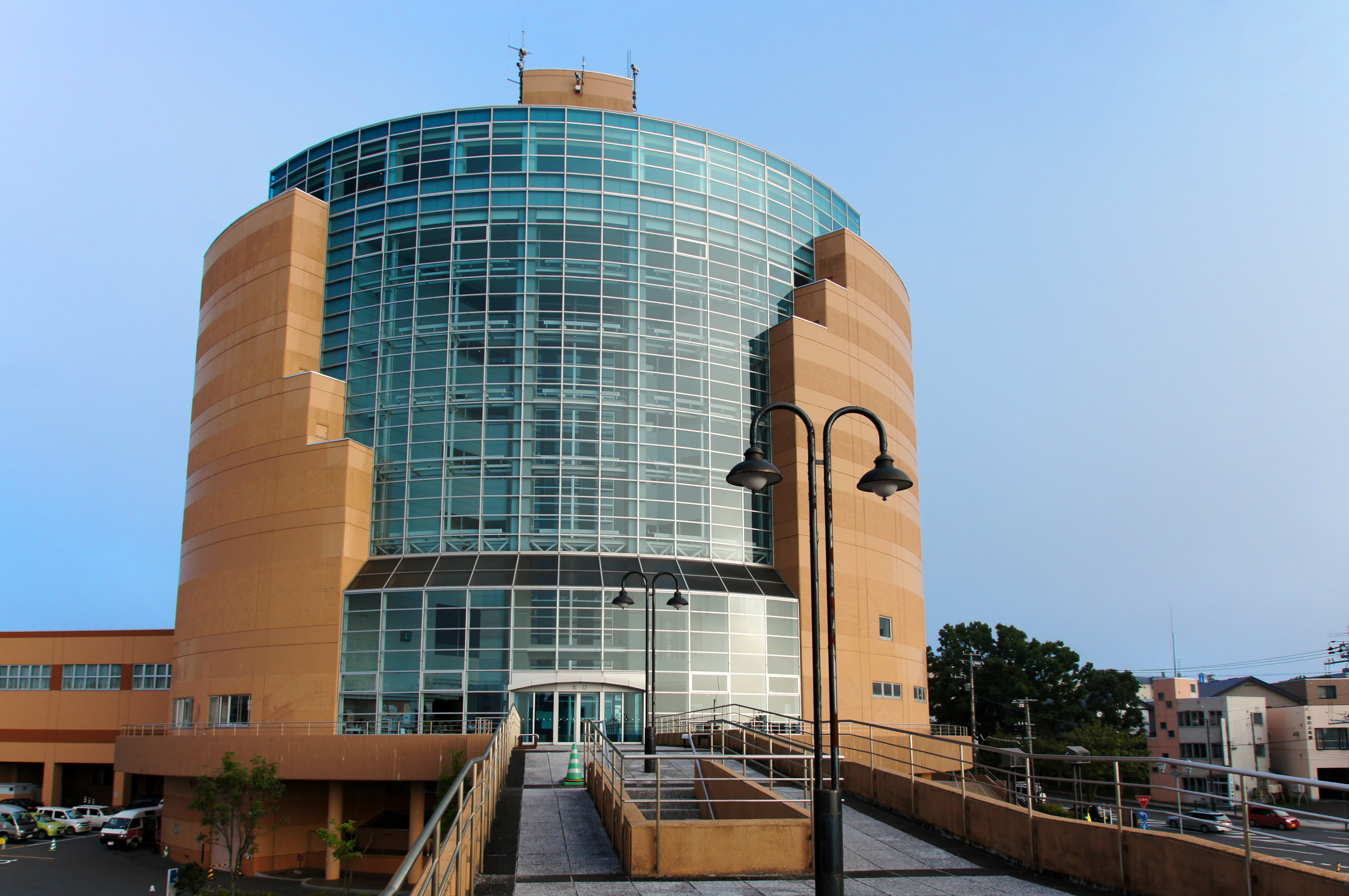
Manabot Nusamai

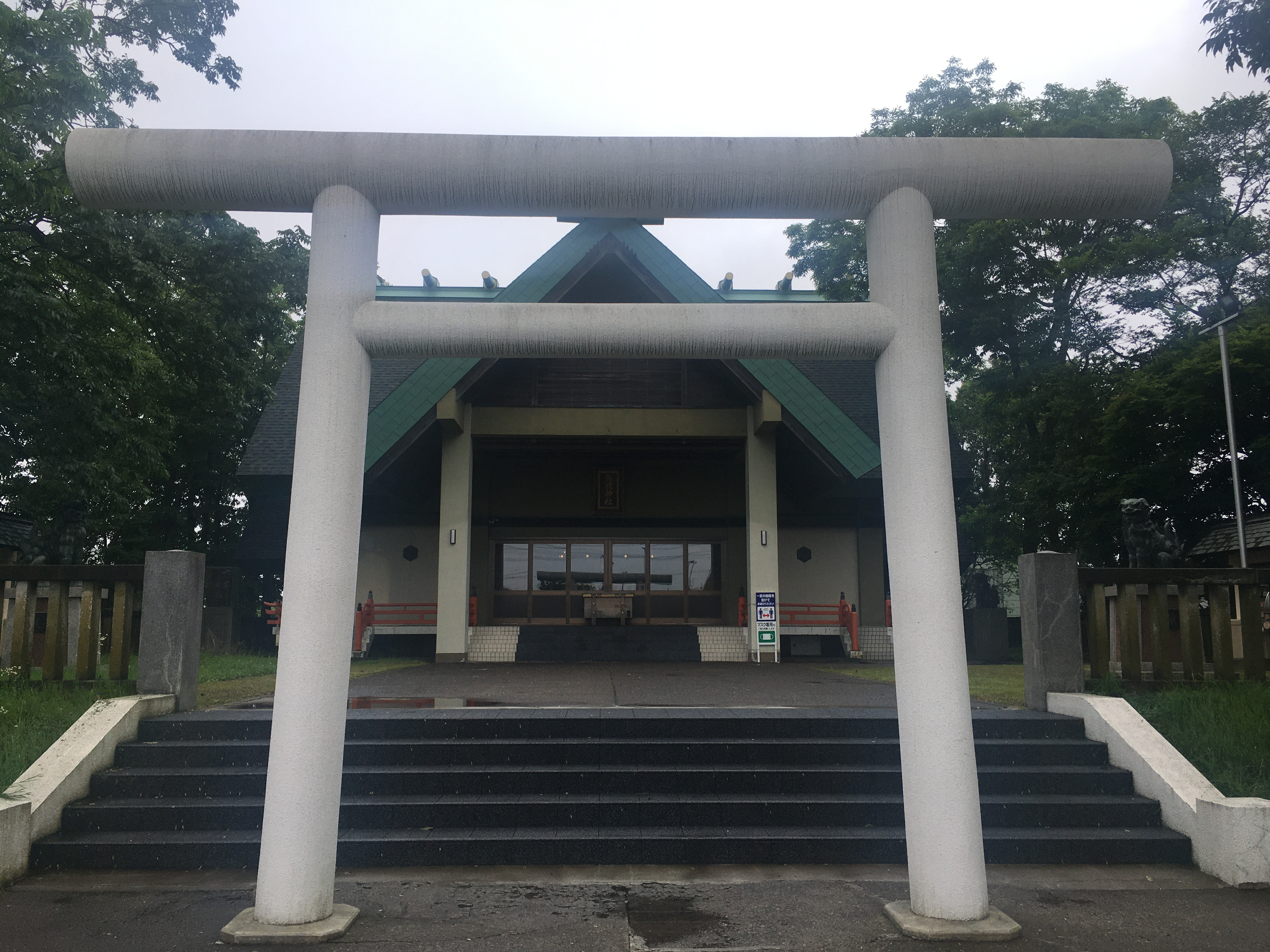
Tottori Jinja

== Culture ==
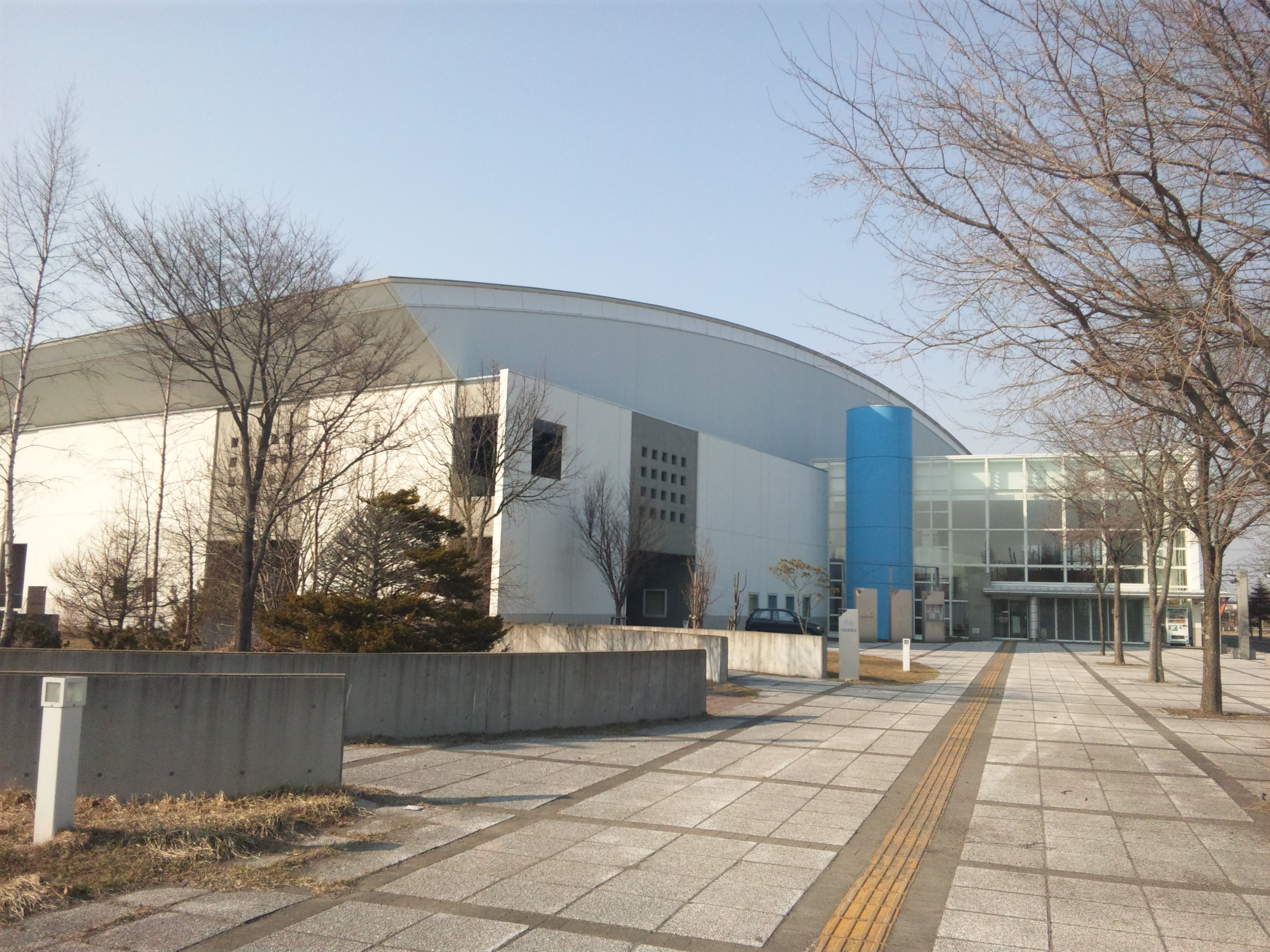
Kushiro Ice Arena

Rin-chan, the city's mascot

=== Sports ===
Ice hockey

Ice hockey is one of the most popular winter sports in Kushiro. In addition to several leagues devoted to amateur play of all ages, Kushiro is home to the Asia League Ice Hockey Nippon Paper Cranes, three time Asia League Champions.

Kushiro and many other cities are interested in hosting bandy teams. On January 8, 2017, the township of Akan hosted the first national championship, although the size of the field was a smaller version than the official rules for a bandy field. In January 2018, the first championship on a full-sized field took place in Shintoku, with participation from three teams, including FACEOFF Kushiro. The national team for women is based in Kushiro and made its World Championship debut in 2020.

- East Hokkaido Cranes (Asia League Ice Hockey)
- Kushiro Bears (Women's Japan Ice Hockey League)
- Daishin (Women's Japan Ice Hockey League)

The Kushiro Ice Arena is the city's biggest stadion for ice hockey, figure skating and shorttrack.

Speed skating

The Yanagimachi Speed Skating Rink hosted the 2003 World Junior Speed Skating Championships and several Japanese Championships. It has an asphalt inline speed skating track on the middle field.

=== Mascot ===
Kushiro's mascot is Rin-chan (りんちゃん). She is a gentiana triflora flower (though she represents all flowers) from Onbetsu. Her favourite drink is milk.

== Notable people from Kushiro ==
- Kazuhiko Chiba, footballer
- Yutaka Fukufuji, ice hockey goaltender
- Yukinobu Hoshino, manga artist
- Akira Ifukube, composer
- Keisuke Itagaki, manga artist
- Saori Kitakaze, sprinter
- Satoshi Kon, anime film director
- Luna H. Mitani, visual artist
- Hiromi Nagakura, photographer
- Maki Nomiya, singer (Pizzicato Five)
- Shinji Somai, film director
- Aina Takeuchi, ice hockey defenseman
- Kazuro Watanabe, astronomer
- Kenji Shiya (Actor)
- GUCHY(FM NORTH WAVE DJ)

== See also ==
- Kushiro wetlands megasolar issue
