= Kushiro Subprefecture =

Coordinates: 42°58′36″N 144°23′06″E

Kushiro Subprefecture 釧路総合振興局
- Kushiro-sōgō-shinkō-kyoku
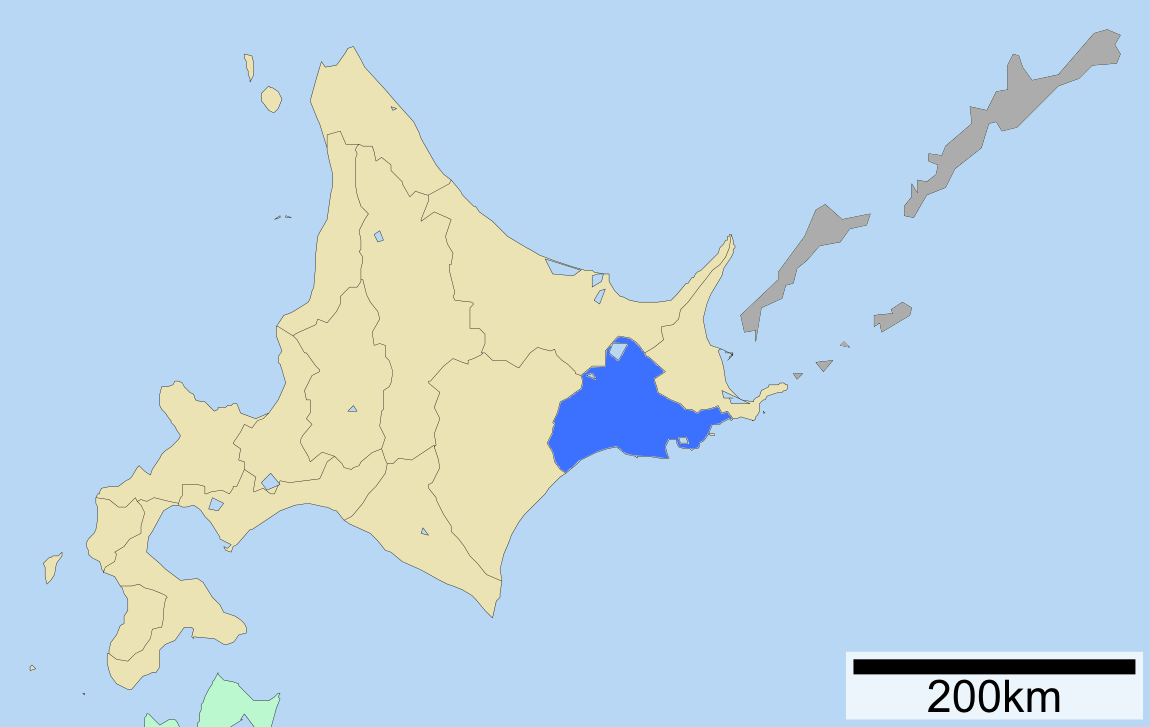
- Prefecture: Hokkaido
- Capital: Kushiro

Area
  - Total: 5,997.38 km^{2} (2,315.60 sq mi)

Population (March 2009)
  - Total: 261,883
  - Density: 44/km^{2} (110/sq mi)
- Website: kushiro.pref.hokkaido.lg.jp

Kushiro Subprefecture (釧路総合振興局, Kushiro-sōgō-shinkō-kyoku) is a subprefecture of Hokkaido Prefecture, Japan. Kushiro is home to a population of red-crowned cranes, estimated in 2022 to number about 1,900.

== Geography ==
=== Municipalities ===
Name		Area (km^{2})	Population	District	Type	Map
Rōmaji	Kanji	Area (km^{2})	Population	District	Type	Map
Akkeshi	厚岸町	734.82	9,048	Akkeshi District	Town	
Hamanaka	浜中町	427.68	6,120	Akkeshi District	Town	
Kushiro (capital)	釧路市	1,362.75	167,875	no district	City	
Kushiro	釧路町	252.57	19,941	Kushiro District	Town	
Shibecha	標茶町	1,099.41	7,862	Kawakami District	Town	
Shiranuka	白糠町	773.74	7,972	Shiranuka District	Town	
Teshikaga	弟子屈町	774.53	7,631	Kawakami District	Town	
Tsurui	鶴居村	571.84	2,516	Akan District	Village	

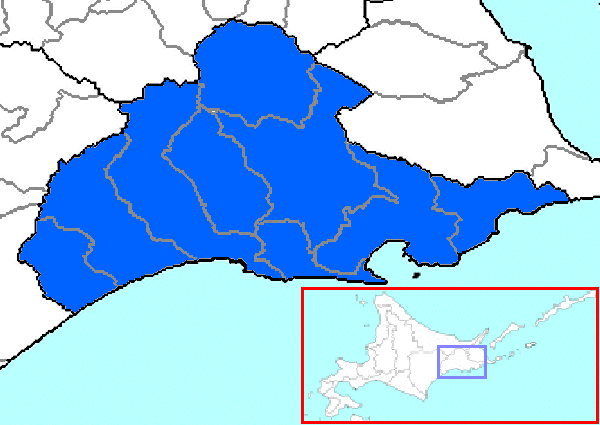
Kushiro Subprefecture

== History ==
- November, 1897: Kushiro Subprefecture established.
- August, 1922: Renamed Kushironokuni Subprefecture (釧路国支庁).
- October 20, 1948: Ashoro District transferred to Tokachi Subprefecture.
- April 1, 1957: Name returned to Kushiro Subprefecture.
