= Kushiro (disambiguation) =

Kushiro is a city in Kushiro subprefecture, Hokkaido in Japan. It may also refer to:

== Education ==
- Kushiro Junior College, a private junior college in Kushiro, Hokkaido, Japan
- Kushiro Public University of Economics, a university in Kushiro, Hokkaido, Japan
- Hokkaido Kushiro Koryo High School, a high school in Kushiro, Hokkaido, Japan

== Municipalities and political divisions ==
- Kushiro Province, a former province in Hokkaido, Japan
- Kushiro Subprefecture, a subprefecture of Hokkaido prefecture in Japan
  - Kushiro District, Hokkaido, a district within the same-named subprefecture
- Kushiro (town), a town in Kushiro subprefecture in Japan

== Transportation ==
- Kushiro Airport, a small international airport near Kushiro, Hokkaido, Japan
- Kushiro Freight Terminal, a JR Freight terminal adjacent to Shin-Fuji Station in Kushiro, Hokkaido, Japan
- Kushiro Station (Hokkaido), a JR Hokkaido train station in Kushiro, Hokkaido, Japan
- Kushiro Station (Shimane), a JR West train station in Hamada, Shimane Prefecture, Japan
- Kushiro-Shitsugen Station, a JR Hokkaido train station in Kushiro Town, Hokkaido, Japan
- Kushiro Sotokan Road, a two-lane national expressway in Kushiro Subprefecture, Hokkaido, Japan
- Higashi-Kushiro Station, a JR Hokkaido train station in Kushiro, Hokkaido, Japan

== Other ==
- Kushiro Ice Arena, an arena in Kushiro, Hokkaido, Japan
- Kushiro Observatory, an observatory in Kushiro, Hokkaido, Japan
- Kushiro River, a river in Hokkaido, Japan
- 4096 Kushiro, a minor planet
