= Kenbokki Island =

Uninhabited island of Japan

Native name: 嶮暮帰島
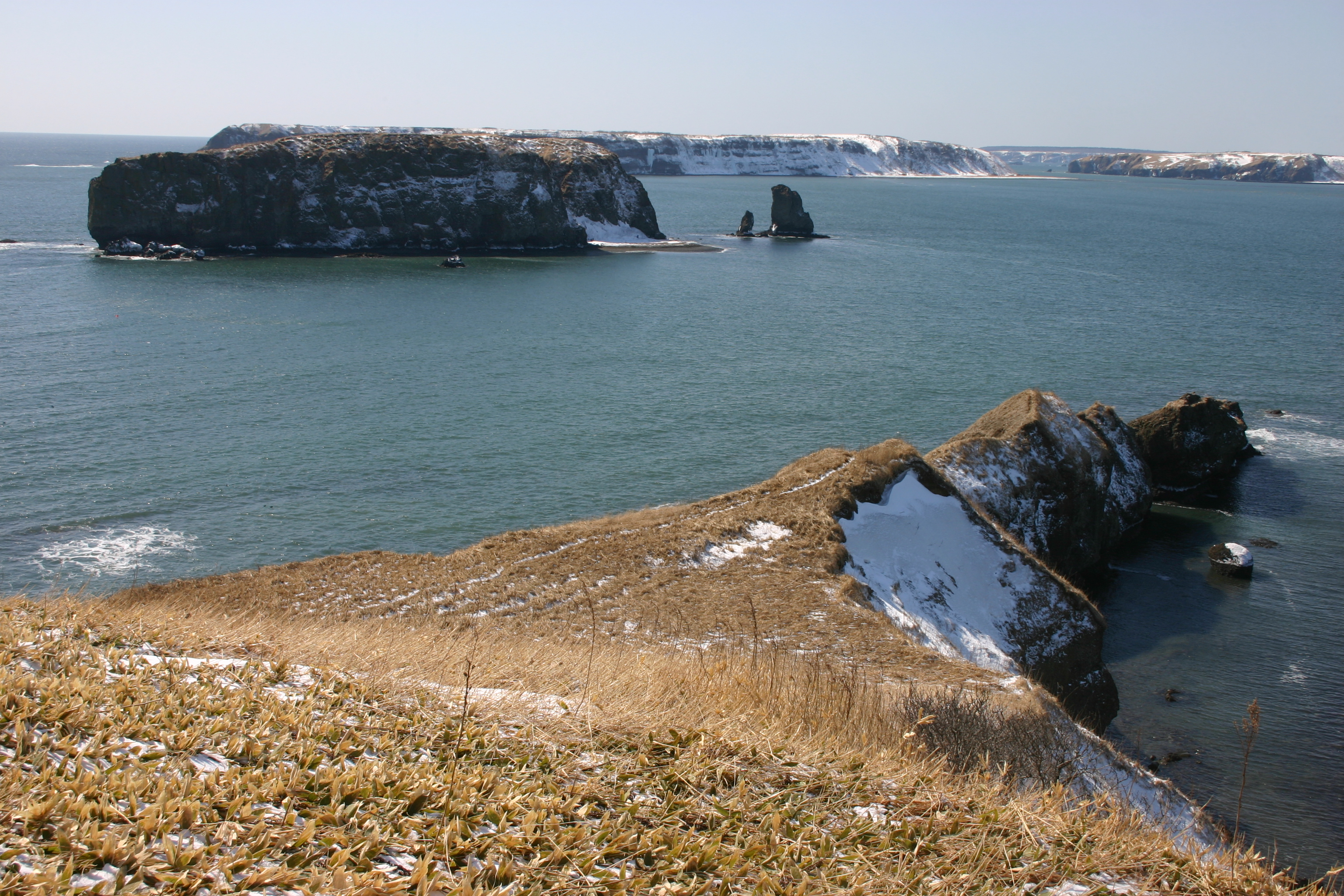
- Kenbokki Island viewed from Cape Azechi
- Interactive map of Kenbokki Island

Geography
- Location: Pacific coast of eastern Hokkaidō
- Coordinates: 43°03′00″N 145°06′18″E
- Coastline: 4.5 km (2.8 mi)

Administration
- Japan
- Prefecture: Hokkaido
- Subprefecture: Kushiro Subprefecture
- District: Akkeshi District
- Town: Hamanaka

Demographics
- Population: uninhabited

Kenbokki Island (嶮暮帰島, Kenbokki-tō) is an uninhabited island in Hamanaka, Hokkaidō, Japan. The island, with a 4.5-kilometer coastline, forms part of Akkeshi Prefectural Natural Park. The name is derived from the Ainu kene-pok or "beneath the alder" (Alnus japonica). During studies in 1999, four species of mammal (long-clawed shrew, grey-sided vole, harbour seal, and visiting sika deer) and forty-one species of birds were recorded on the island; there were no amphibians or reptiles. Of the birds, Leach's storm petrel (some twenty thousand pairs), Japanese cormorant, Japanese snipe, slaty-backed gull, and common reed bunting were identified as breeding on Kenbokki. Flora include Gentiana triflora var. japonica (エゾリンドウ), Hemerocallis esculenta, and lily-of-the-valley. Masanori Hata founded Mutsugorō Animal Kingdom (ムツゴロウ動物王国) after his stay on the island.

== See also ==
- List of Natural Monuments of Japan (Hokkaidō)
