= Hamanaka, Hokkaido =

Hamanaka 浜中町 Hamanaka-chō
- Town
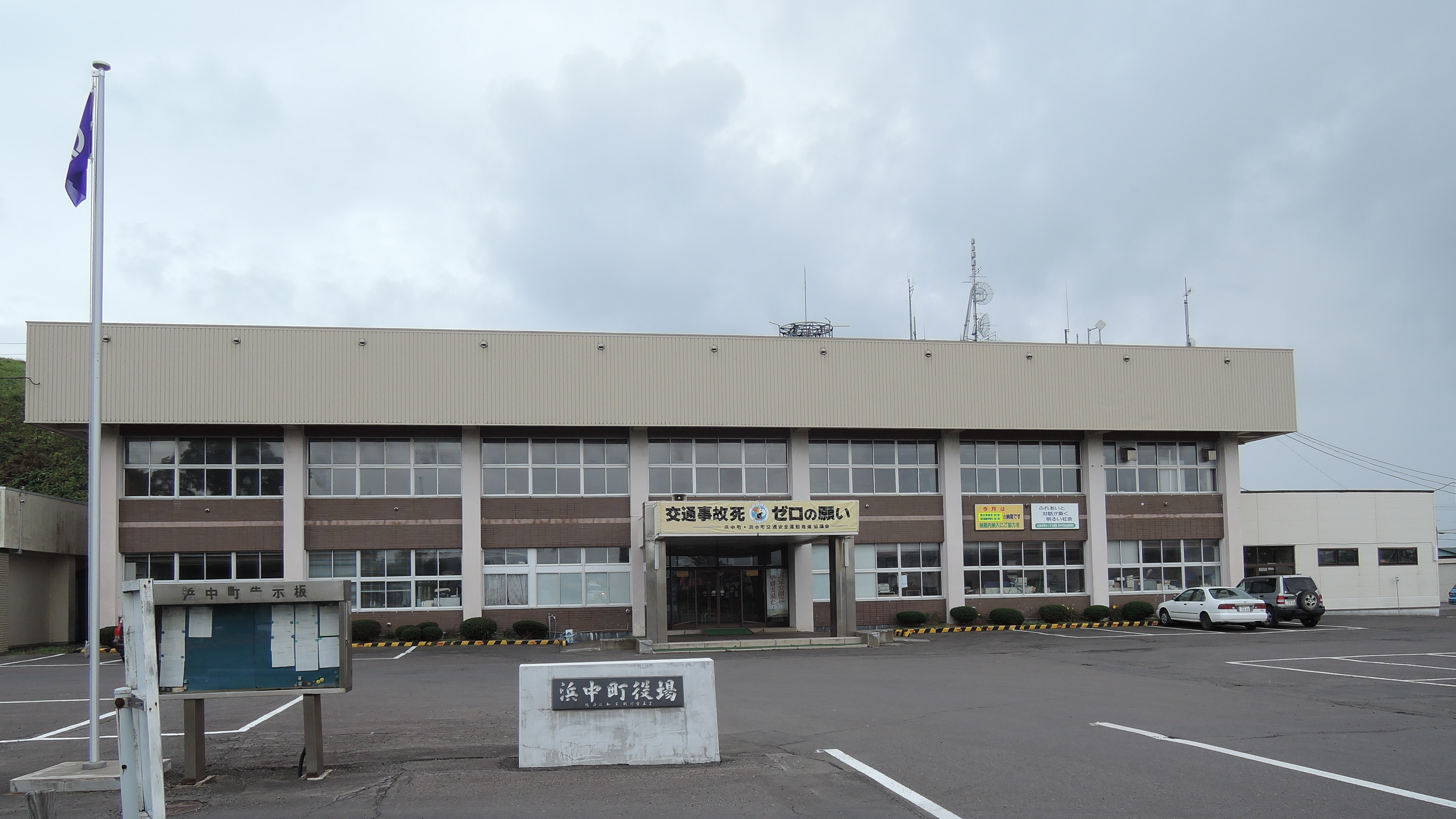
- former Hamanaka town hall

- Flag Emblem

- Location of Hamanaka in Hokkaido (Kushiro Subprefecture)
- Interactive map of Hamanaka
- Coordinates: 43°04′34″N 145°07′53″E
- Country: Japan
- Region: Hokkaido
- Prefecture: Hokkaido (Kushiro Subprefecture)
- District: Akkeshi

Area
  - Total: 423.12 km^{2} (163.37 sq mi)

Population (November 31, 2025)
  - Total: 5,169
  - Density: 12.22/km^{2} (31.64/sq mi)
- Time zone: UTC+09:00 (JST)
- City hall address: 445 Yufutsu, Hamanaka-cho, Akkeshi-gun, Hokkaido 088-1592
- Climate: Dfb
- Website: www.townhamanaka.jp
- Symbols
- Bird: Tufted puffin
- Flower: Ezo Lily
- Tree: Japanese white birch

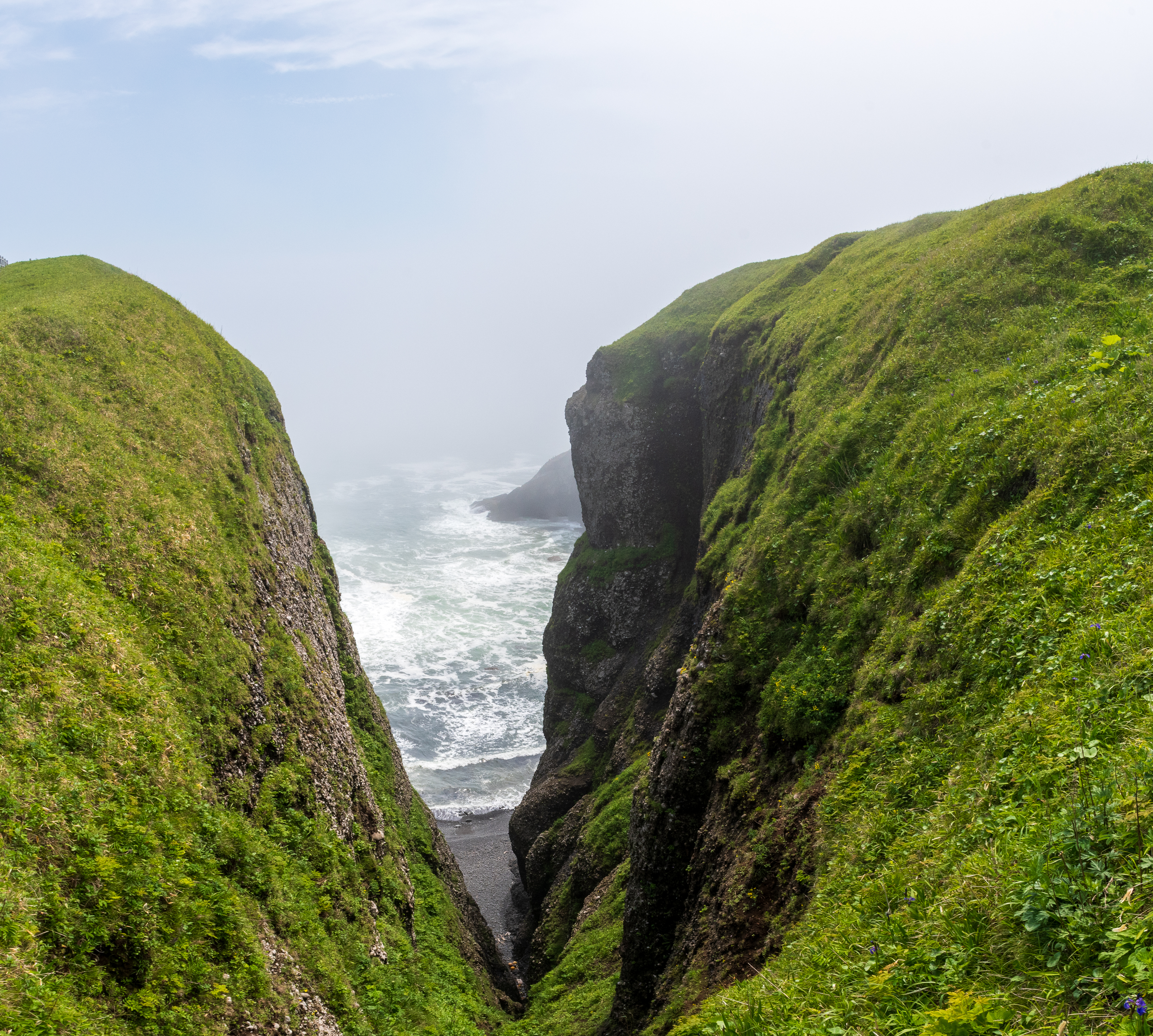
Cape Namida

Hamanaka (浜中町, Hamanaka-chō) is a town located in Kushiro Subprefecture, Hokkaidō, Japan. As of 30 November 2025, the town had an estimated population of 5,169 in 2580 households, and a population density of 12.2 people per km^{2}. The total area of the town is 739.12 km^{2} (285.38 sq mi).

== Geography ==
Hamanaka is located in southeastern Hokkaido. Hamanaka is located in the southeastern part of the Kushiro Regional Subprefectural Bureau, facing the Pacific Ocean. The town hall was previously located in the Kiritappu district, on a tombolo formed between Bokibetsu on the mainland of Hokkaido and the tombolo island of Yufutsu. However, due to concerns about tsunami flooding, it was relocated to the higher ground in this area, and the new building was completed in January 2021.

Hamanaka is located approximately 80 kilometers east of Kushiro City and 50 kilometers west of Nemuro City. It faces the Pacific Ocean with Hamanaka Bay and Biwase Bay. The northern part of the town is hilly, with Japan National Route 44 running east–west. It is home to Akkeshi-Kiritappu-Konbumori Quasi-National Park, and the southern part is a plain containing the approximately 3,168-hectare Kiritappu Wetland. Dense fog is common in summer, and temperatures rarely rise.

=== Neighboring municipalities ===
  - Akkeshi
  - Nemuro
  - Betsukai

=== Climate ===
According to the Köppen climate classification, Hamanaka has a humid continental climate. It has a pronounced continental climate with large temperature differences, including large annual and daily temperature ranges. It receives a lot of snow, and is designated as a heavy snow area. In winter, temperatures of around -20 °C are not uncommon, making it extremely cold.

Climate data for 榊町（1991年 - 2020年）
Month	Jan	Feb	Mar	Apr	May	Jun	Jul	Aug	Sep	Oct	Nov	Dec	Year
Record high °C (°F)	8.7 (47.7)	12.6 (54.7)	15.1 (59.2)	23.5 (74.3)	35.2 (95.4)	30.7 (87.3)	34.1 (93.4)	35.5 (95.9)	30.2 (86.4)	24.7 (76.5)	20.7 (69.3)	13.0 (55.4)	35.5 (95.9)
Mean daily maximum °C (°F)	−0.8 (30.6)	−0.8 (30.6)	2.8 (37.0)	8.1 (46.6)	12.5 (54.5)	15.1 (59.2)	18.6 (65.5)	21.1 (70.0)	19.9 (67.8)	15.3 (59.5)	9.0 (48.2)	2.2 (36.0)	10.3 (50.5)
Daily mean °C (°F)	−5.3 (22.5)	−5.3 (22.5)	−1.4 (29.5)	3.3 (37.9)	7.6 (45.7)	11.0 (51.8)	14.9 (58.8)	17.3 (63.1)	15.7 (60.3)	10.4 (50.7)	3.9 (39.0)	−2.6 (27.3)	5.8 (42.4)
Mean daily minimum °C (°F)	−11.2 (11.8)	−11.7 (10.9)	−6.7 (19.9)	−1.6 (29.1)	3.2 (37.8)	7.8 (46.0)	12.0 (53.6)	14.3 (57.7)	11.5 (52.7)	4.8 (40.6)	−1.8 (28.8)	−8.1 (17.4)	1.1 (34.0)
Record low °C (°F)	−25.3 (−13.5)	−26.0 (−14.8)	−21.4 (−6.5)	−14.2 (6.4)	−4.7 (23.5)	−1.5 (29.3)	2.5 (36.5)	5.1 (41.2)	1.1 (34.0)	−5.2 (22.6)	−13.0 (8.6)	−18.0 (−0.4)	−26.0 (−14.8)
Average precipitation mm (inches)	26.2 (1.03)	18.5 (0.73)	50.1 (1.97)	73.1 (2.88)	103.2 (4.06)	111.7 (4.40)	117.3 (4.62)	124.2 (4.89)	157.0 (6.18)	123.3 (4.85)	74.5 (2.93)	56.2 (2.21)	1,033.3 (40.68)
Average precipitation days (≥ 1.0 mm)	6.0	4.5	7.5	9.3	10.7	8.9	10.3	10.9	10.7	9.1	9.2	7.7	104.3
Mean monthly sunshine hours	185.6	179.3	197.8	180.1	168.6	125.0	106.2	117.1	146.8	170.2	164.8	165.9	1,913.8
Source 1: Japan Meteorological Agency
Source 2: JMA

=== Demographics ===
Per Japanese census data, the population of Hamanaka has declined in recent decades.

Historical population
Year	Pop.	±%
1970	10,192	—
1980	9,243	−9.3%
1990	8,395	−9.2%
2000	7,335	−12.6%
2010	6,511	−11.2%
2020	5,507	−15.4%

== Government ==
Hamanaka has a mayor-council form of government with a directly elected mayor and a unicameral town council of 10 members. Hamanaka, as part of Kushiro Subprefecture, contributes one member to the Hokkaidō Prefectural Assembly. In terms of national politics, the town is part of the Hokkaidō 7th district of the lower house of the Diet of Japan.

== Economy ==
The economy of Hamanaka is based on dairy farming in the northern inland areas. The raw milk produced there is used as an ingredient in the luxury ice cream "Häagen-Dazs" and the lactic acid bacteria drink "Calpis." The town is also one of Japan's leading producers of wild kelp.

== Education ==
Hamanaka has one public elementary school, one public middle school, one public combined elementary/middle school and one public high school.

== Transportation ==
JR Hokkaido - Nemuro Main Line

■ Chanai - Hamanaka - Anebetsu

=== Highways ===
- National Route 44

== Local attractions ==
- Kenbokki Island
- Kiritappu Wetland
- Akkeshi-Kiritappu-Konbumori Quasi-National Park

== Noted residents of Hamanaka ==
- Monkey Punch, manga artist, born Kazuhiko Katō (加藤一彦 Katō Kazuhiko); creator of Lupin the Third
- Katsumi Ōno, diplomat
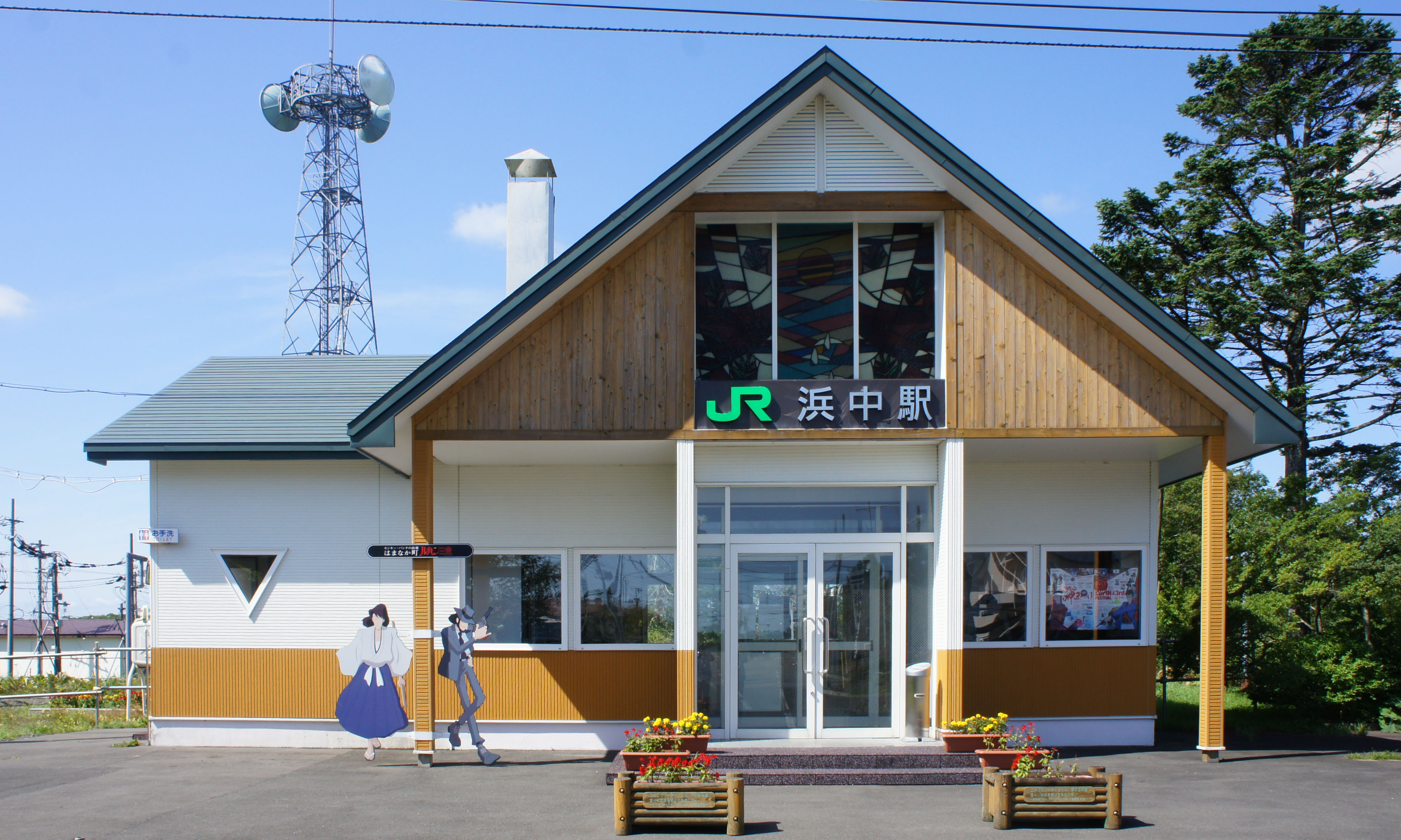
Hamanaka railway station

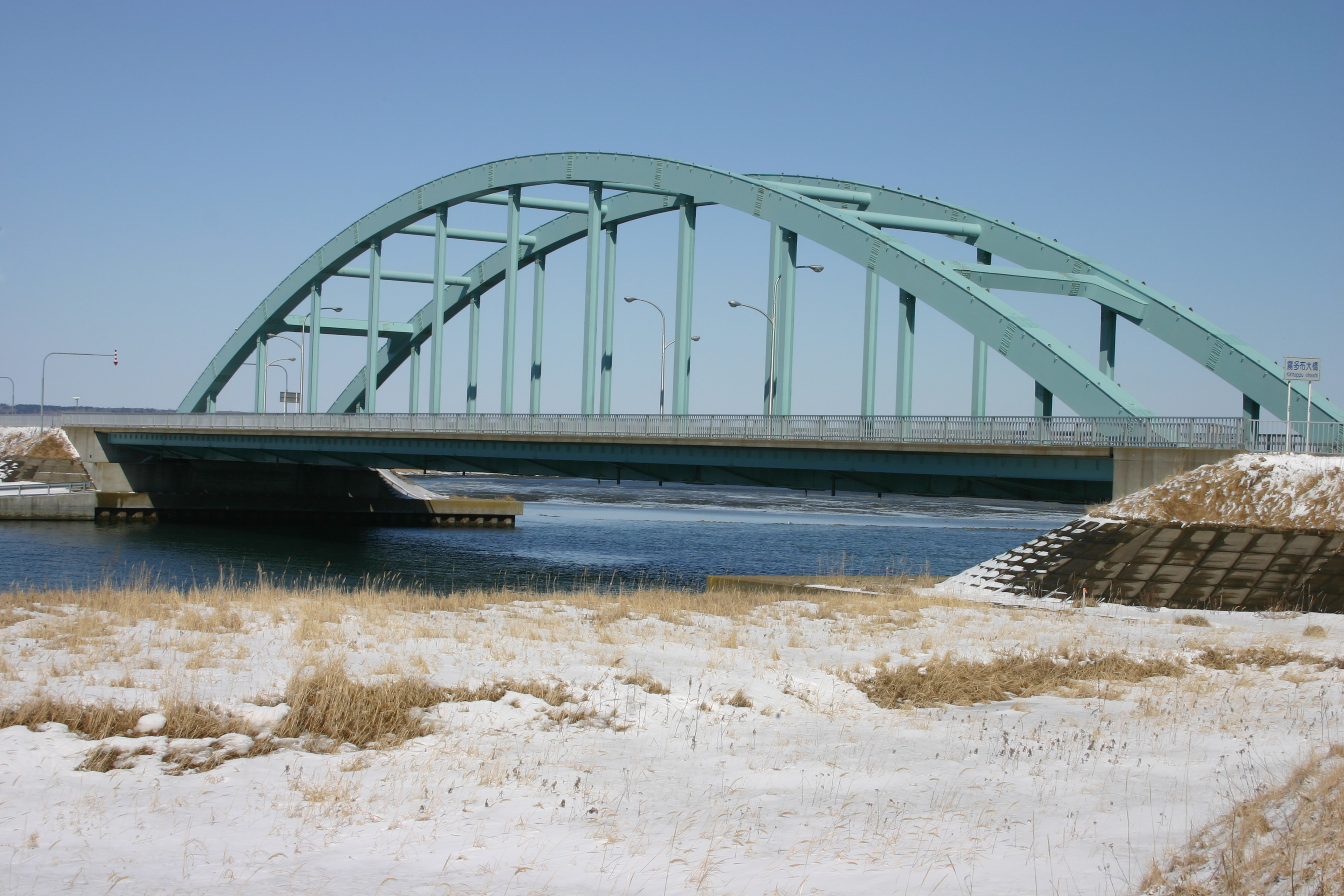
Kiritappu Bridge

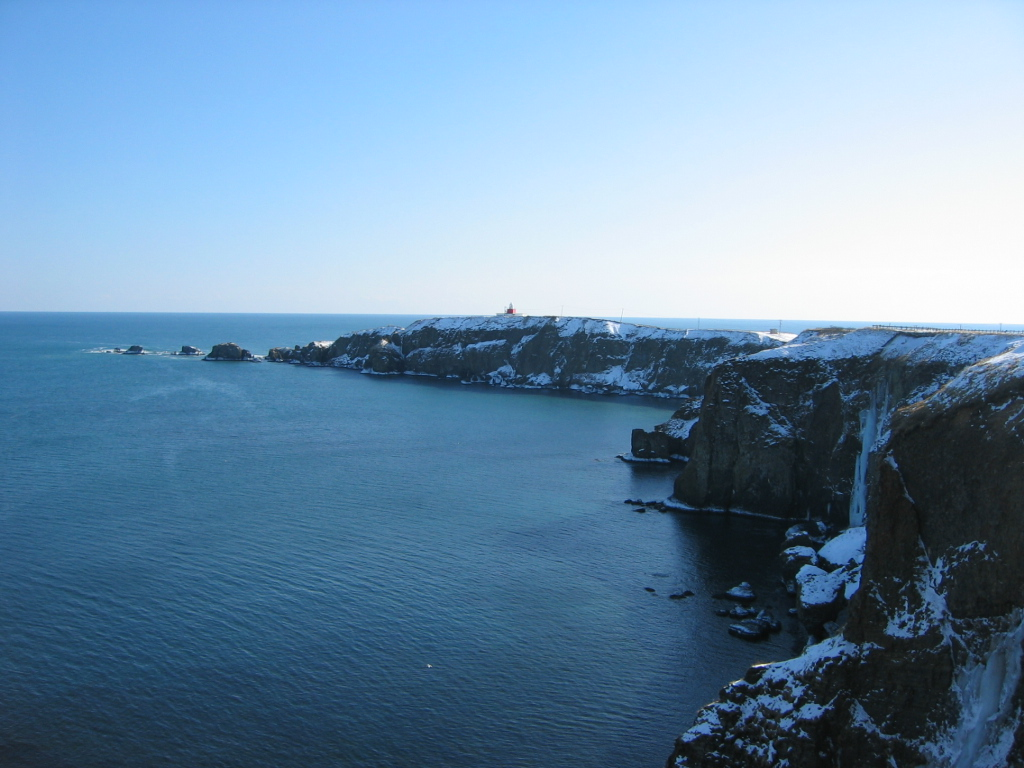
Cape Kiritappu

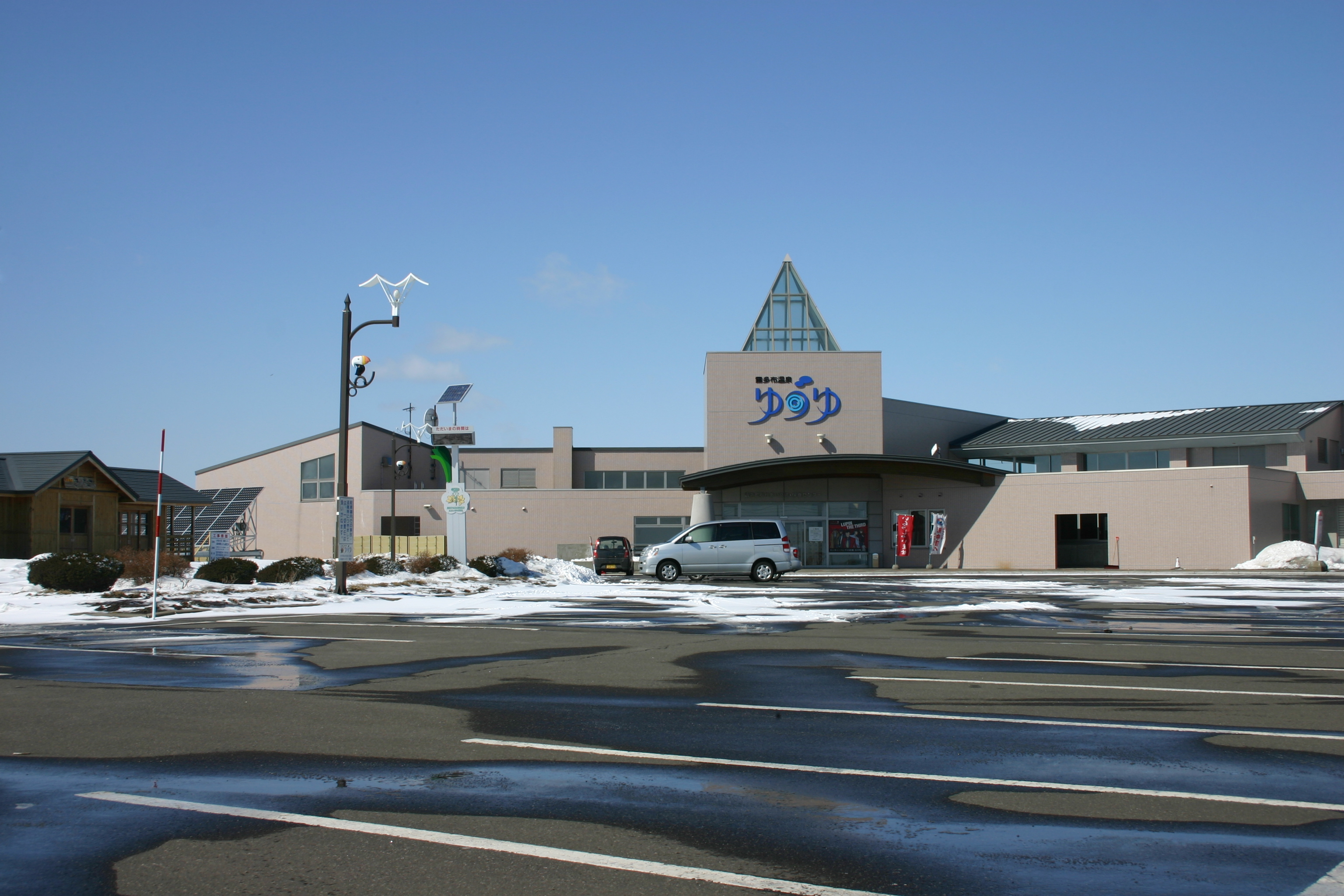
Kiritappu onsen

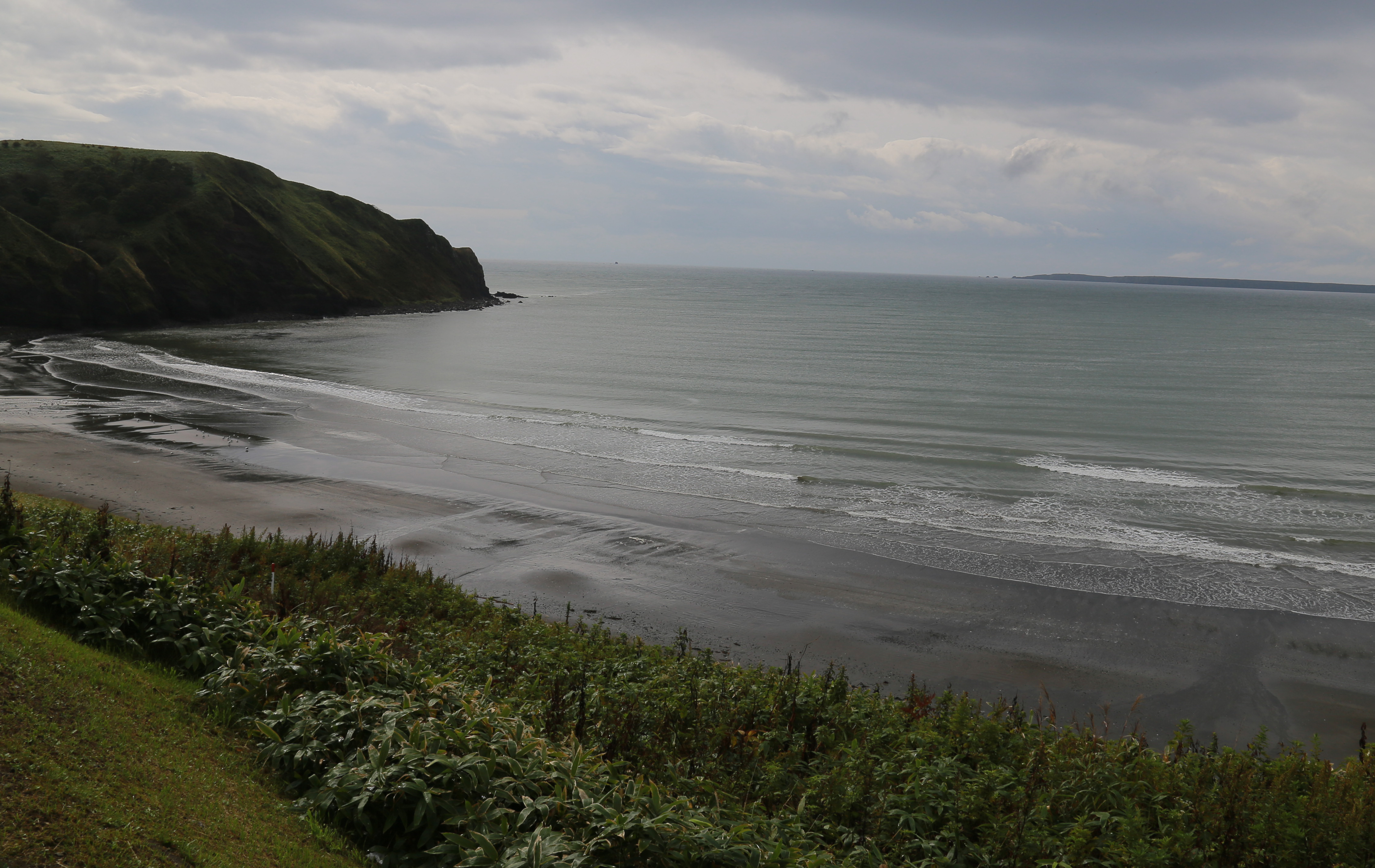
Urayakotan beach

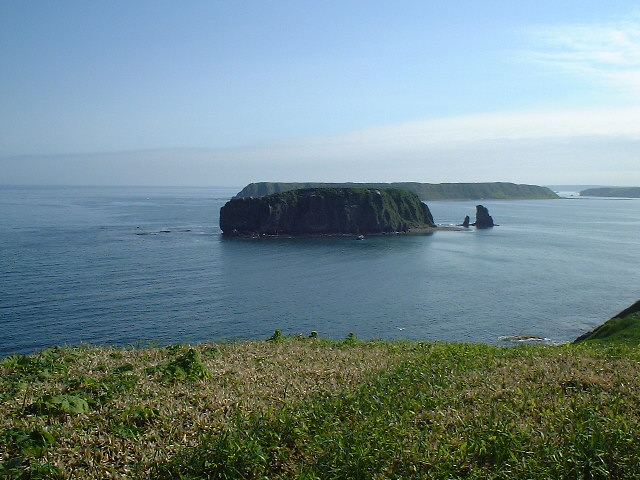
Kenbokki Island (in the background) from Cape Azechi.
