= Akkeshi-Kiritappu-Konbumori Quasi-National Park =

Quasi-national park in Hokkaido, Japan

Coordinates: 43.0772°N 145.1681°E

- 厚岸霧多布昆布森国定公園
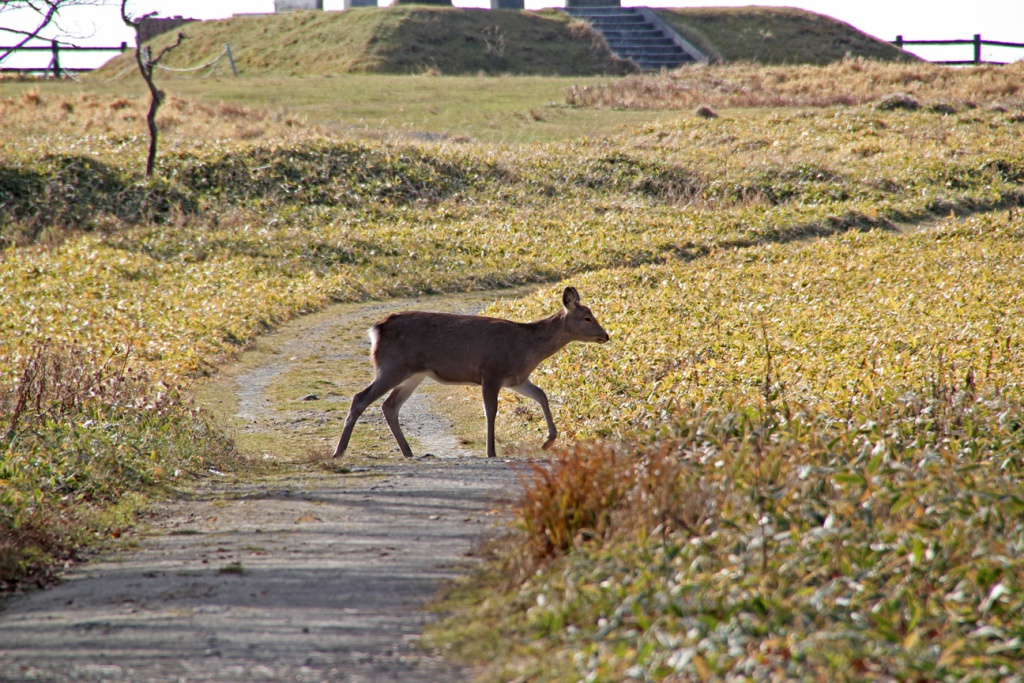
- Sika deer at Cape Aikappu, Akkeshi
- Location: Hokkaidō, Japan
- Area: 414.87 km^{2} (160.18 sq mi)
- Established: 30 March 2021

Akkeshi-Kiritappu-Konbumori Quasi-National Park (厚岸霧多布昆布森国定公園, Akkeshi Kiritappu Konbu-mori kokutei kōen) is a Quasi-National Park in eastern Hokkaidō, Japan. Established in 2021, the park spans the municipalities of Akkeshi, Hamanaka, Kushiro, and Shibecha. It subsumes and replaces the former Akkeshi Prefectural Natural Park, established in 1955.

The park, which has a total designated area of 414.87 square kilometres (160.18 sq mi), including a marine zone of 89.21 square kilometres (34.44 sq mi), comprises three non-contiguous largely coastal areas, adjoining areas of lake, marsh, wetland, and forest, and several islands. Prominent features include, from west to east, Todo Rock (トド岩) and Tako Rock (タコ岩), Cape Shirepa (尻羽岬), Cape Aikappu (愛冠岬), Daikoku Island (a Special Wildlife Protection Area, the seabird breeding grounds of which are a Natural Monument), Lake Akkeshi (a Special Wildlife Protection Area and part of the Akkeshi-ko and Bekambeushi-shitsugen Ramsar site), Kojima Island (小島), Cape Namida (涙岬), Mochirippu-numa (藻散布沼), Hichirippu-numa (火散布沼), Kenbokki Island, Cape Azechi (アゼチ岬), Kiritappu-shitsugen (a Special Wildlife Protection Area and Ramsar site, the peat-forming plant communities of which are a Natural Monument), Cape Kiritappu (霧多布岬), and Poroto-numa (幌戸沼).

Flora within the park include the Sakhalin fir, Erman's birch, Arctic iris, Sendai-hagi, Ezo-kanzō, and small cranberry; fauna, the Japanese crane, white-tailed eagle, Steller's sea eagle, whooper swan, Leach's storm petrel, and tufted puffin.

== See also ==
- National Parks of Japan
- List of Natural Monuments of Japan (Hokkaidō)
- List of Ramsar sites in Japan
- Wildlife Protection Areas in Japan
