= Kiritappu Wetland =

Protected wetland in Japan

Coordinates: 43°05′01″N 145°04′50″E

Designations

Ramsar Wetland
- Official name: Kiritappu-shitsugen
- Designated: 10 June 1993
- Reference no.: 613

Kiritappu Wetland (霧多布湿原; きりたっぷしつげん) is a 3,168ha. wetland area in Hamanaka-cho, Akkeshi District, Hokkaidō, Japan. It is also called Wetland of flowers (花の湿原) because numerous flowers can be seen in summer.

Kiritappu wetland is the third largest wetland in Japan, following the Kushiro Shitsugen National Park and Sarobetsu field.

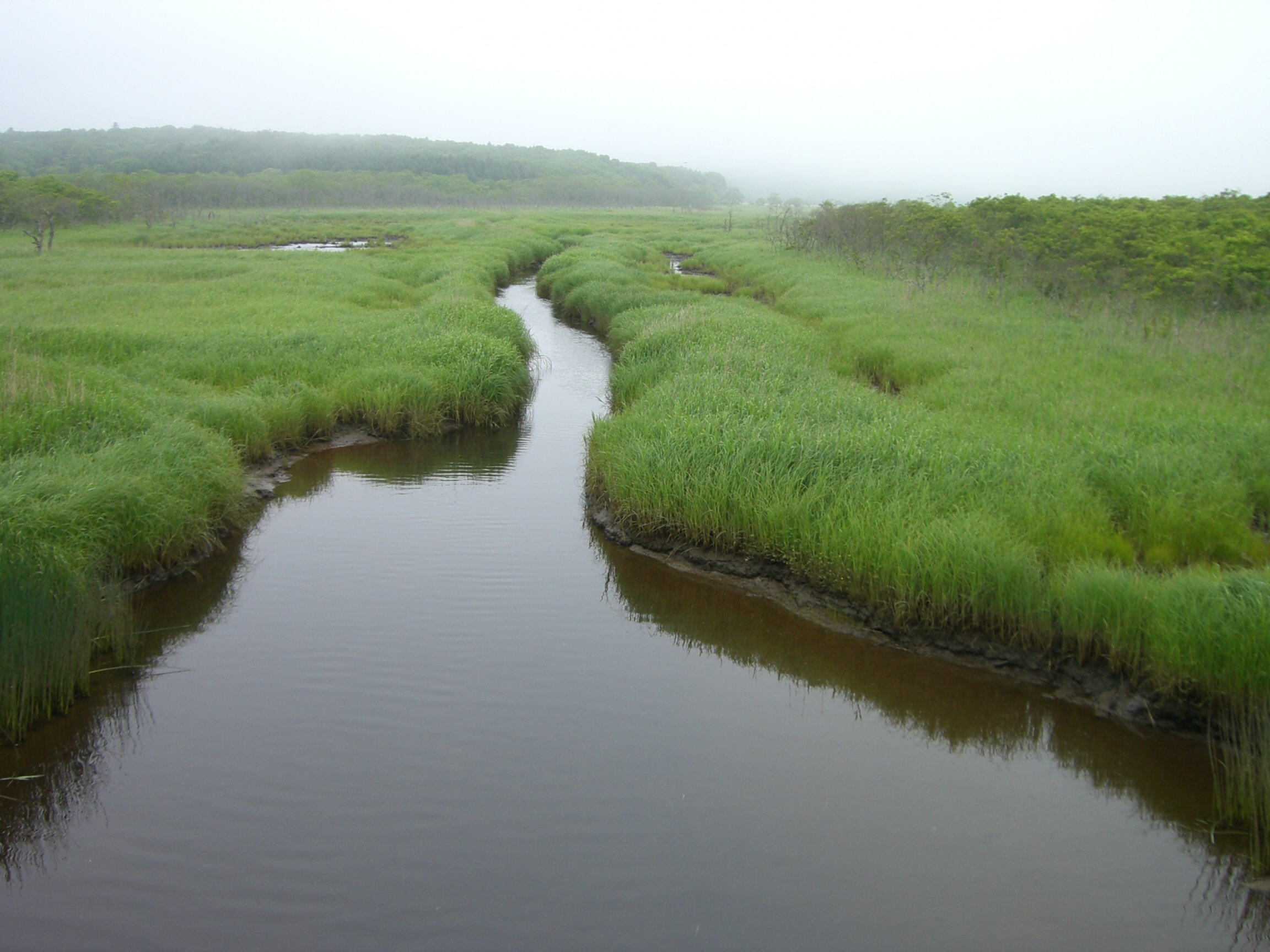
Peatland in the center of Kiritappu wetland

The peatland in the center of Kiritappu wetland (803ha) was nominated as a natural treasure of Japan in 1922. In 1993, it was registered as one of the Ramsar sites.

The local people founded a national trust in 2000, Kiritappu Shitsugen Trust N.P.O., and are making efforts to protect and preserve the wetland.

== Location ==
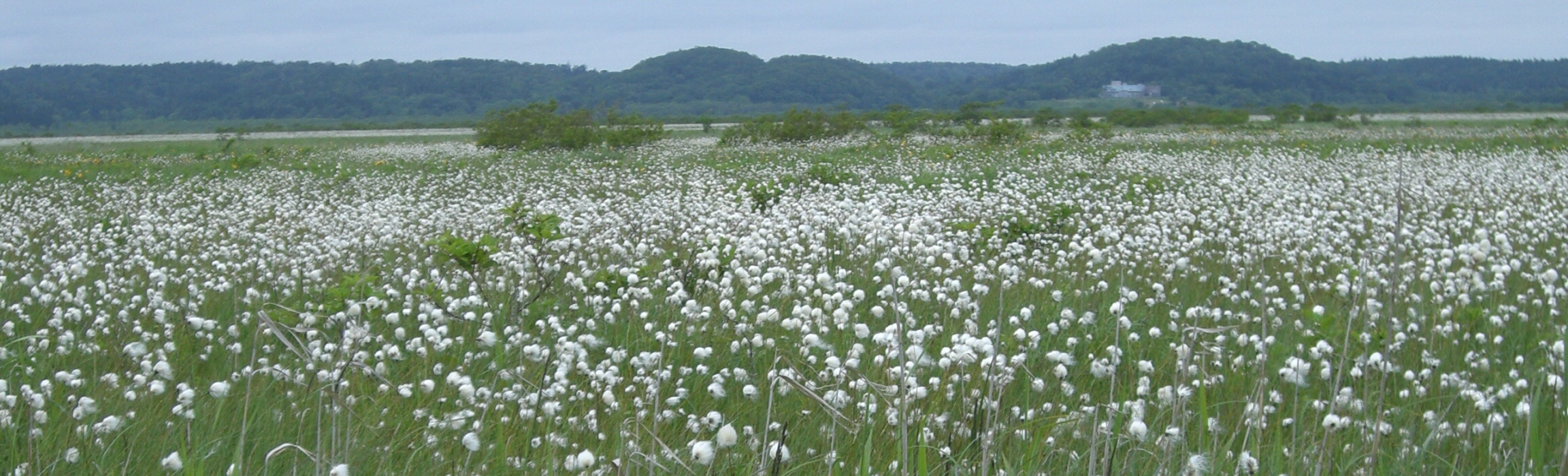
Hare's-tail cottongrass in early July

Kiritappu Wetland is on the northeast side of Japan, on the east side of Hokkaidō, facing the Pacific Ocean between Kushiro and Nemuro. It is 9 km long and 3 km wide. On the north hill lies Kiritappu Wetland Center (霧多布湿原センター), a visitors' center run by Kiritappu Shitsugen Trust N.P.O. On the height of the west part of the wetland there is an observation deck. Hokkaidō road no. 808 runs there which is also called "MG Road" (Marshy Grassland Road).

== Flora ==
It is called "Wetland of flowers" because there are relatively more flowers compared to other wetlands. These flowers include:

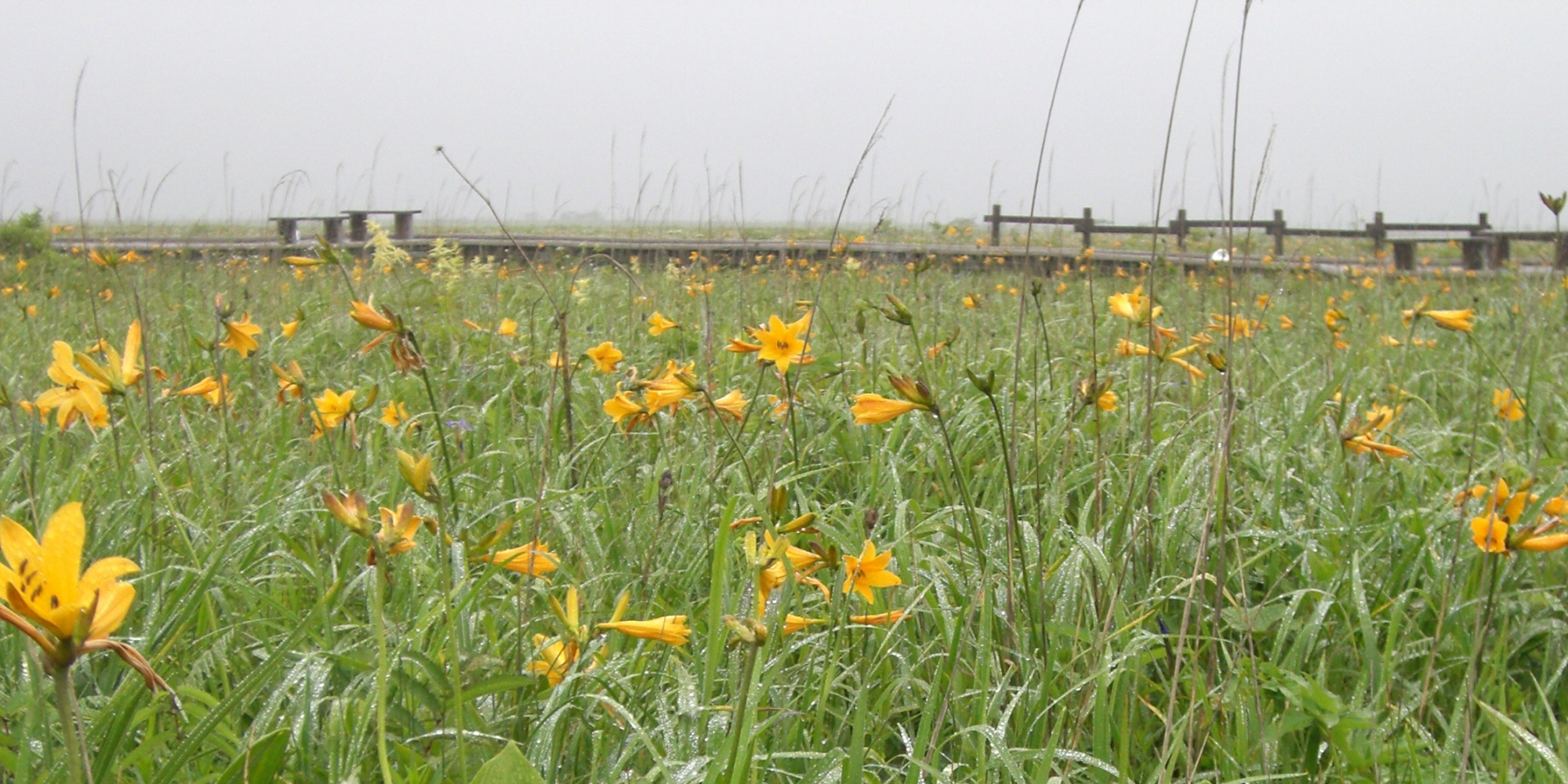
Hemerocallis middendorffii flowers and wooden boardwalks

- Lysichiton camtschatcense ミズバショウ、white (June)
- Fritillaria camschatcensis クロユリ、deep purple(June)
- Eriophorum vaginatum ワタスゲ、white cotton (June, July)
- Iris setosa ヒメオウギアヤメ、blue-purple (July)
- Hemerocallis middendorffii エゾカンゾウ、yellow(July)
- Iris ensata var. spontanea ノハナショウブ、red-purple (July)
- Gentiana triflora var. japonica エゾリンドウ blue (September)
