= Kushiro Province =

Former province of Japan

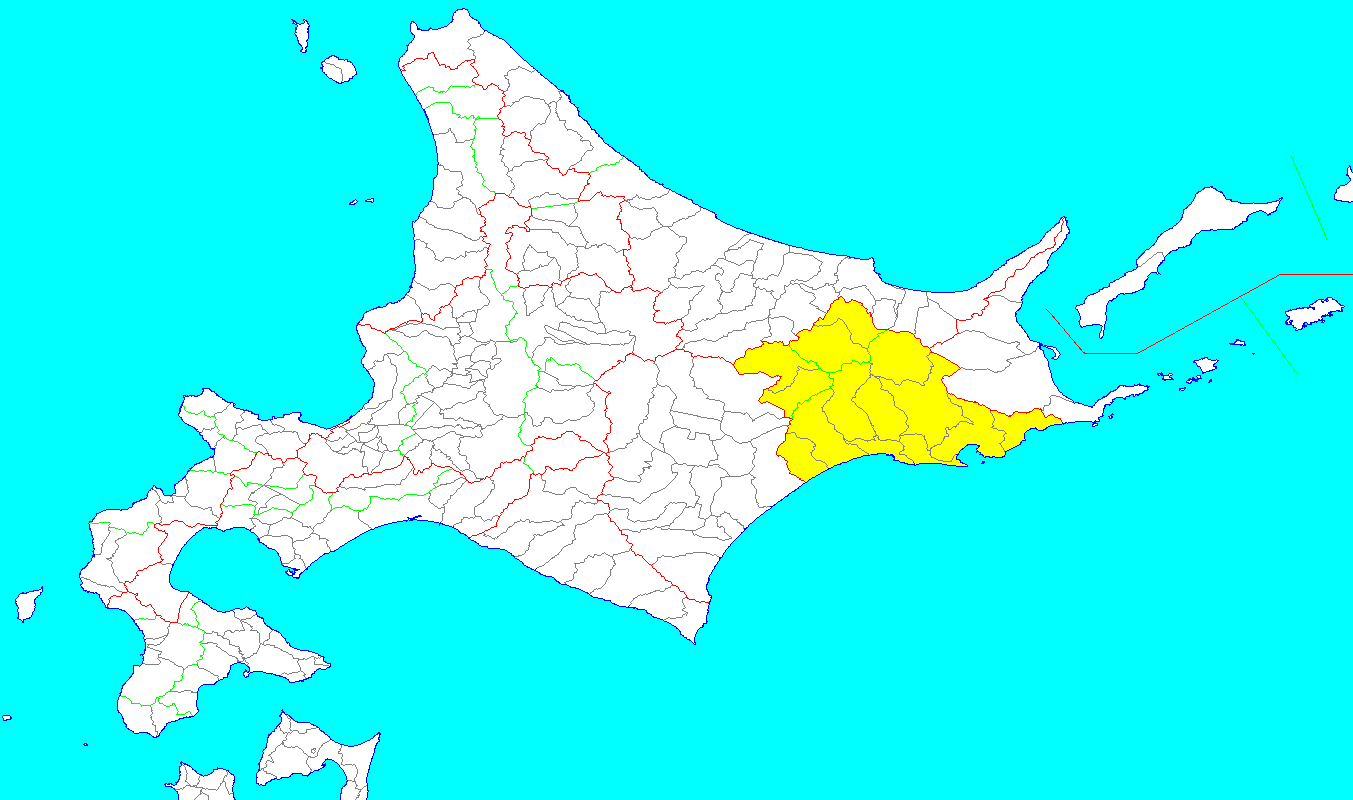
Location of Kushiro Province about 1869

Kushiro Province (釧路国, Kushiro no Kuni; Japanese pronunciation: [kɯ̥̈.ɕí.ɾò̞ (nò̞ kɯ̈̀.ɲ̟ì), -ɕì-]) was a short-lived province in Hokkaido. It corresponded to modern-day Kushiro Subprefecture and part of Okhotsk Subprefecture.

== History ==
After 1869, the northern Japanese island became known as Hokkaido; and regional administrative subdivisions were identified, including Kushiro Province.

In 1882, Hokkaido was separated into three prefectures — Hakodate Prefecture (函館県), Sapporo Prefecture (札幌県), and Nemuro Prefecture (根室県). In 1886, the three prefectures were abolished, and Hokkaido was put under the Hokkaido Agency (北海道庁). At the same time, Kushiro Province continued to exist for some purposes. For example, Kushiro is explicitly recognized in treaties in 1894 (a) between Japan and the United States and (b) between Japan and the United Kingdom.

=== Timeline ===
- 1869—use of the name Hokkaido started
- August 15, 1869 Kushiro Province established with 7 districts
- 1872 Census finds a population of 1,734
- July 1881 Abashiri District (網尻郡) incorporated for Abashiri District (網走郡), Kitami Province
- 1882—prefectures established
- 1886—Hokkaido Agency established
- 1947—Hokkaido Prefecture established

== Districts ==
- Shiranuka (白糠郡)
- Ashoro (足寄郡)
- Kushiro (釧路郡)
- Akan (阿寒郡)
- Abashiri (網尻郡)
- Kawakami (川上郡)
- Akkeshi (厚岸郡)
