= Daikoku Island (Akkeshi) =

Uninhabited island in the country of Japan

Native name: 大黒島
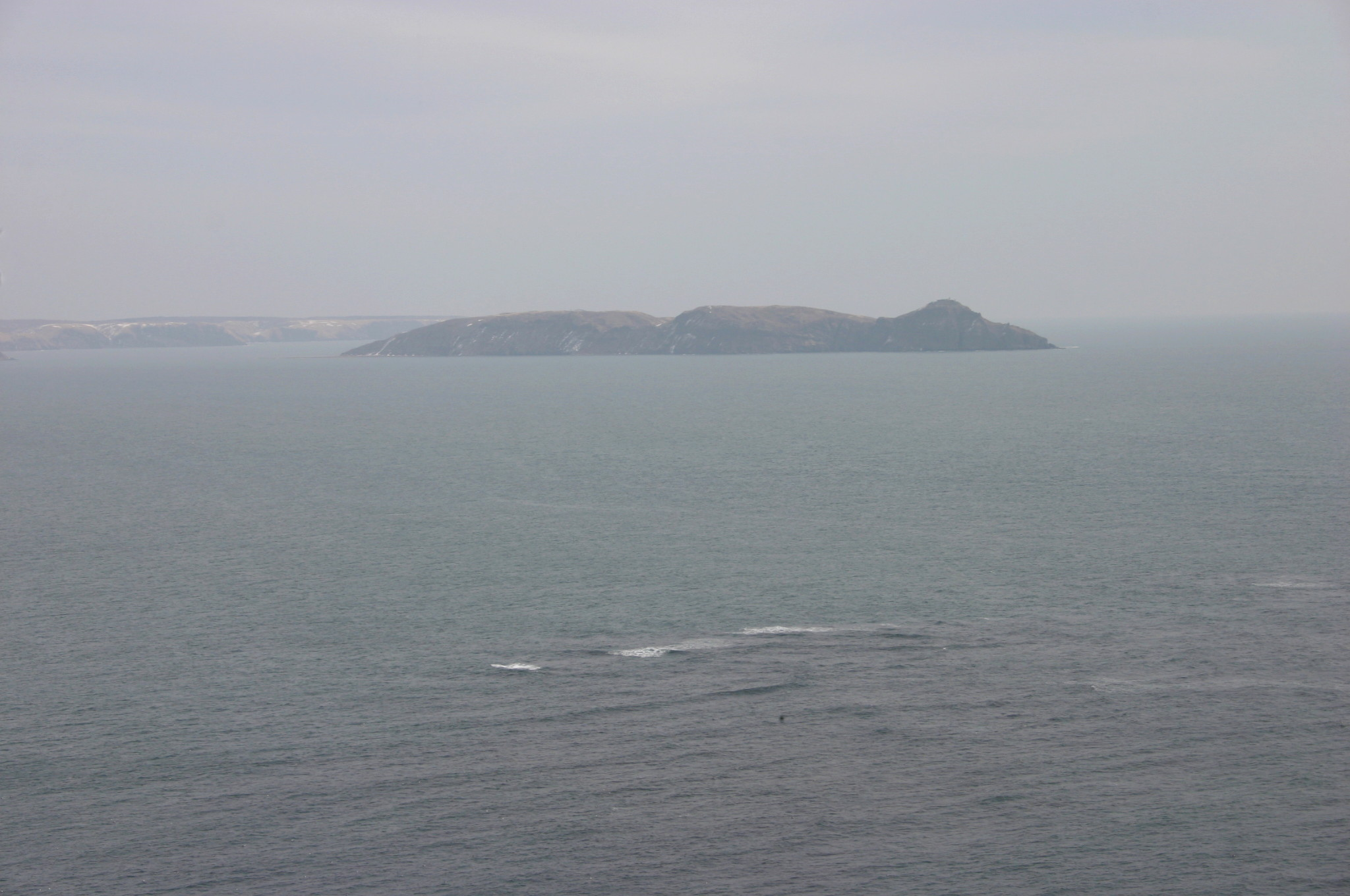
- Interactive map of Daikoku Island

Geography
- Location: Pacific coast of eastern Hokkaidō
- Coordinates: 42°57′01″N 144°52′09″E
- Area: 1.07 km^{2} (0.41 sq mi)
- Length: 1.8 km (1.12 mi)
- Width: 700 m (2300 ft)
- Coastline: 6.1 km (3.79 mi)
- Highest elevation: 108 m (354 ft)

Administration
- Japan
- Prefecture: Hokkaido
- Subprefecture: Kushiro Subprefecture
- District: Akkeshi District
- Village: Akkeshi

Demographics
- Population: uninhabited

Daikoku Island (大黒島, Daikoku-jima) is an uninhabited island in Akkeshi, Hokkaidō, Japan. Together with the smaller island of Kojima (小島) to the north, it forms a natural breakwater at the entrance to Akkeshi Bay (厚岸湾). At the southwest tip of the island at an elevation of approximately 105 metres is Akkeshi Lighthouse (厚岸灯台), which began operations on 25 November 1890. Of the island's 107 hectares, 64 are owned by the state, 42 by the municipality, and one is in private hands.

== Environment ==
The island forms part of Akkeshi Prefectural Natural Park and its entire area of 107 hectares is a Special Wildlife Protection Area. It provides an important breeding ground for seabirds, in particular several hundred thousand Leach's storm petrel, as well as the tufted puffin, Japanese cormorant, pelagic cormorant, spectacled guillemot, slaty-backed gull, and rhinoceros auklet. Twelve hectares of the breeding grounds have been designated a Natural Monument. The island has been recognised as an Important Bird Area (IBA) by BirdLife International for its seabird colonies.

Also found on the island are the grey-sided vole and harbour seal. Trees include the green alder, painted maple, and Erman's birch; other plants, Sakhalin knotweed and Parasenecio hastatus.

== See also ==
- List of Natural Monuments of Japan (Hokkaidō)
- Wildlife Protection Areas in Japan
