= Tōya Station (Kushiro) =

Railway station in Kushiro Town, Hokkaido, Japan

B55 Tōya Station 遠矢駅
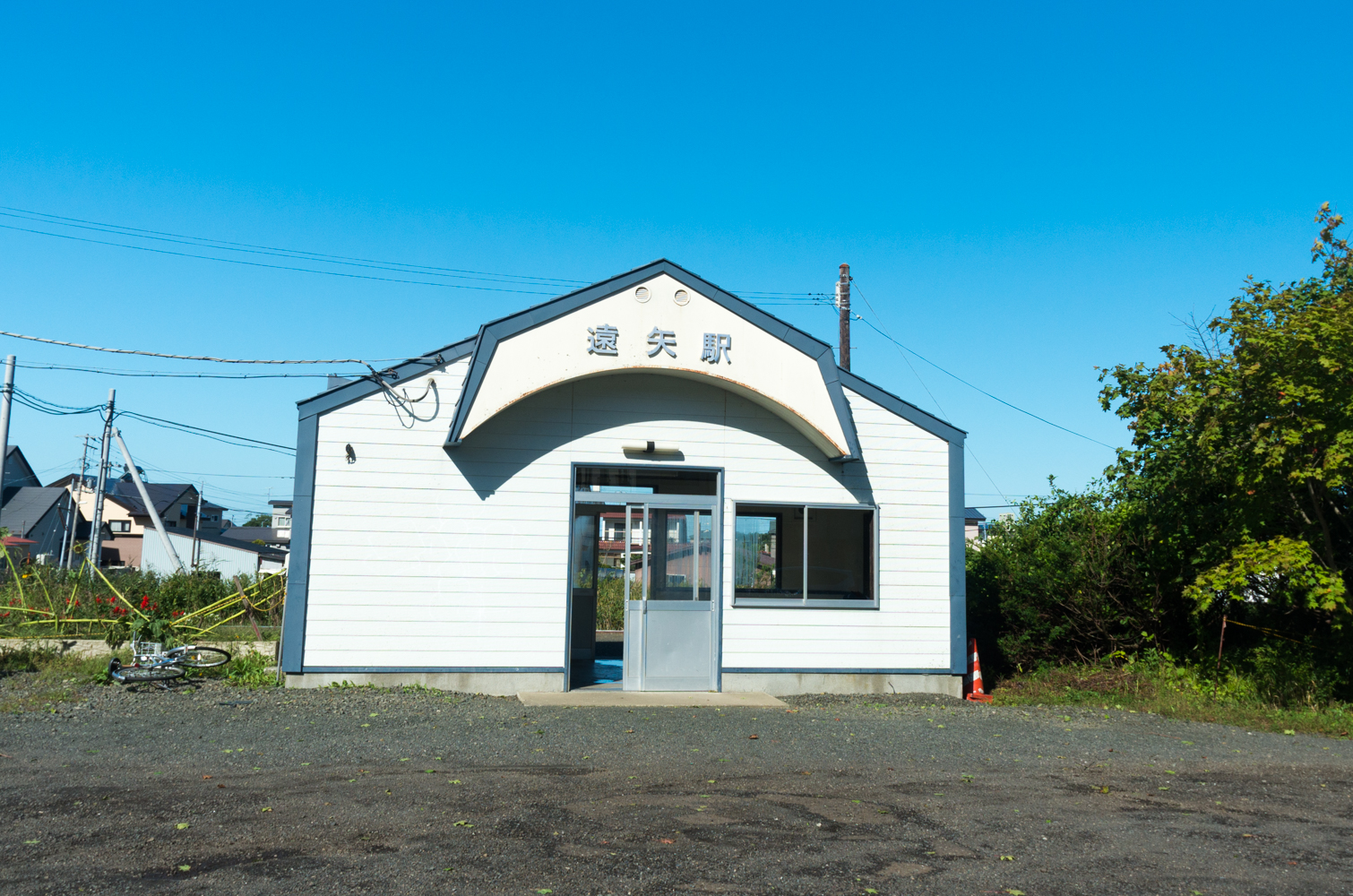
- Station building in September 2018

General information
- Location: 2 Chome Toya, Kushiro, Kushiro District, Hokkaido 088-2145; Japan
- Coordinates: 43°2′52.39″N 144°27′30.19″E
- System: regional rail
- Operator: JR Hokkaido
- Line: Senmō Main Line
- Distance: 7.4 km from Higashi-Kushiro
- Platforms: 1 side platform
- Tracks: 1

Other information
- Status: Unstaffed
- Station code: B55
- Website: Official website

History
- Opened: 15 September 1927; 99 years ago

Passengers
- FY2022: 12 daily

Services
Preceding station	JR Hokkaido	Following station
Kushiro-Shitsugen towards Abashiri	Senmō Main Line Local	Higashi-Kushiro towards Kushiro
Location
- Location within Hokkaido Location within Japan

Tōya Station (遠矢駅, Tōya-eki) is a railway station located in the town of Kushiro, Hokkaidō, Japan. It is operated by JR Hokkaido.

== Lines ==
The station is served by the Senmō Main Line, and lies 7.4 km from the starting point of the line at Higashi-Kushiro .

== Layout ==
Tōya Station has one side platform serving bidirectional traffic. The station is unattended.

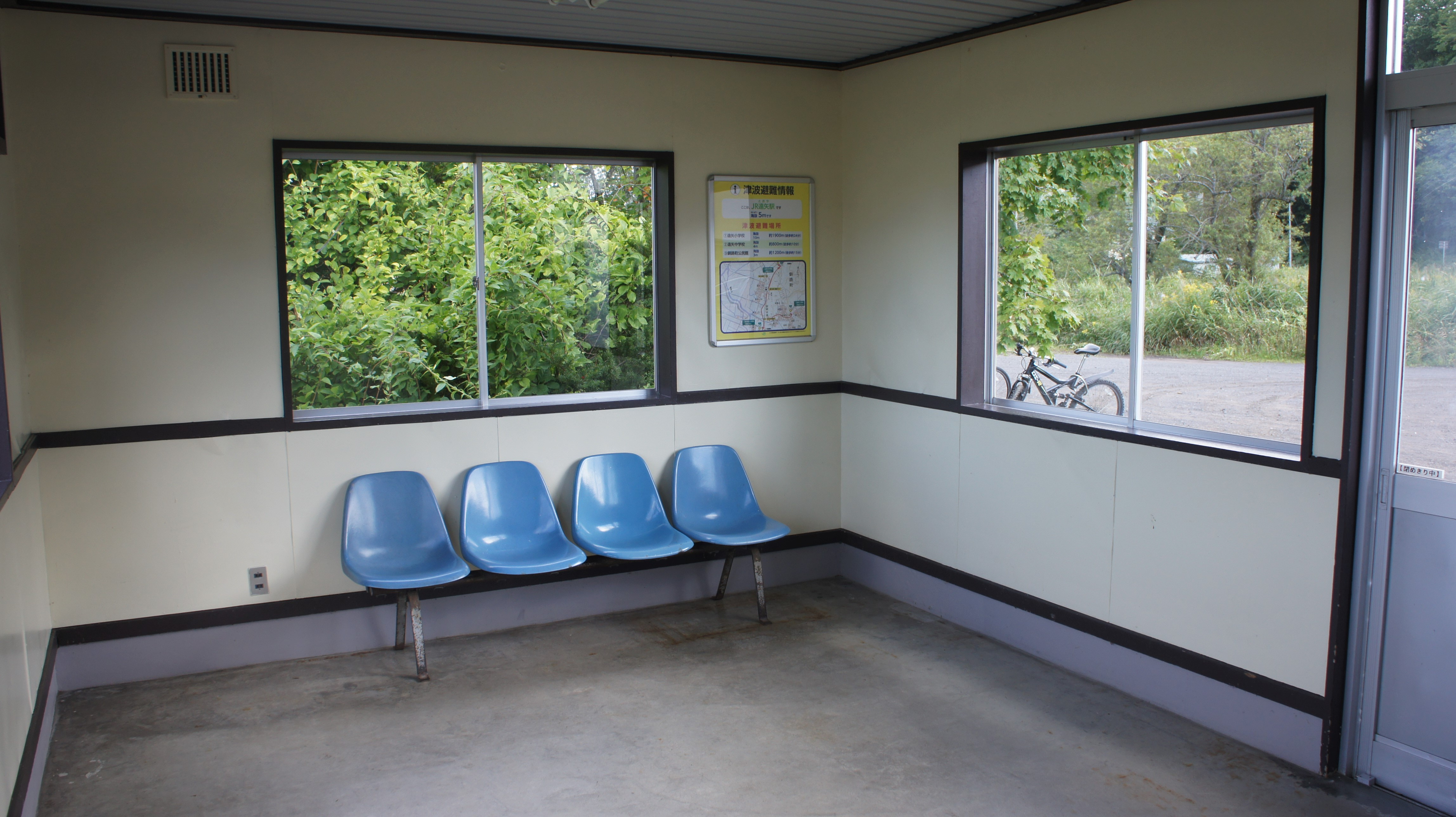
Waiting Room

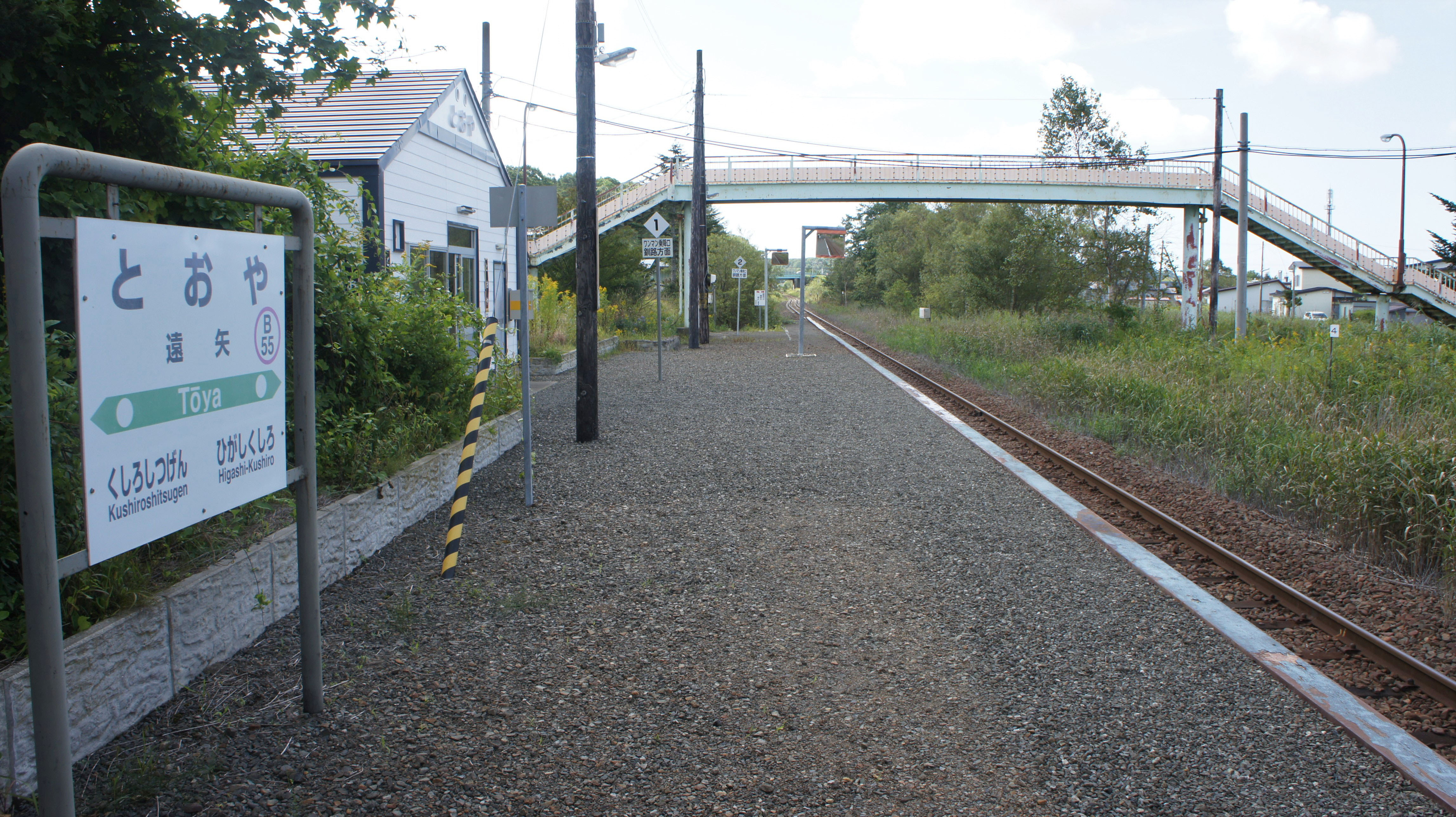
Platform

== History ==
The station opened on 15 September 1927 with the opening of the Ministry of Railways Senmō Main Line between Kushiro Station and Shibecha Station. Following the privatization of the Japanese National Railways on 1 April 1987, the station came under the control of JR Hokkaido. The current station building was reconstructed in 1988.

== Passenger statistics ==
In fiscal 2022, the station was used by an average of 12 passengers daily.

== Surrounding area ==
- Japan National Route 391
- Kushiro Town Hall Toya Branch

== See also ==
- List of railway stations in Japan
