= Hosooka Station =

Railway station in Kushiro Town, Hokkaido, Japan

B57 Hosooka Station 細岡駅
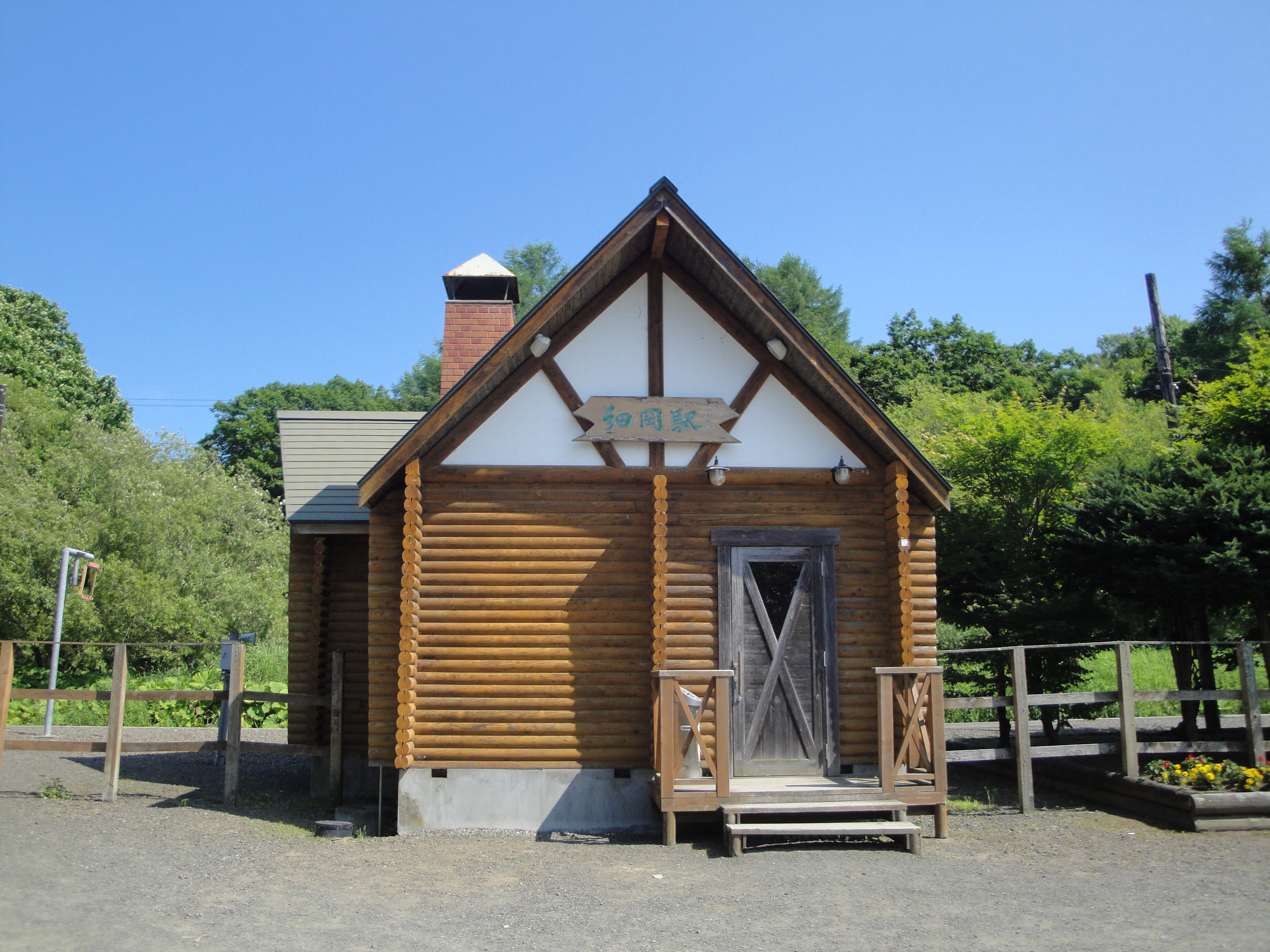
- Station building in September 2018

General information
- Location: Tatsukobu, Kushiro, Kushiro District, Hokkaido 088-2141; Japan
- Coordinates: 43°6′17.93″N 144°28′10.65″E
- System: regional rail
- Operator: JR Hokkaido
- Line: Senmō Main Line
- Distance: 17.1 km from Higashi-Kushiro
- Platforms: 1 side platform
- Tracks: 1

Other information
- Status: Unstaffed
- Station code: B57
- Website: Official website

History
- Opened: 27 September 1927; 99 years ago

Passengers
- FY2022: 0.2 daily

Services
Preceding station	JR Hokkaido	Following station
Tōro towards Abashiri	Senmō Main Line Local	Kushiro-Shitsugen towards Kushiro
Location
- Location within Hokkaido Location within Japan

Hosooka Station (細岡駅, Hosooka-eki) is a railway station located in the town of Kushiro, Hokkaidō, Japan. It is operated by JR Hokkaido.

== Lines ==
The station is served by the Senmō Main Line, and lies 17.1 km from the starting point of the line at Higashi-Kushiro .

== Layout ==
Hosooka Station has one side platform serving bidirectional traffic. The current station building is a single-story log cabin and is unattended.

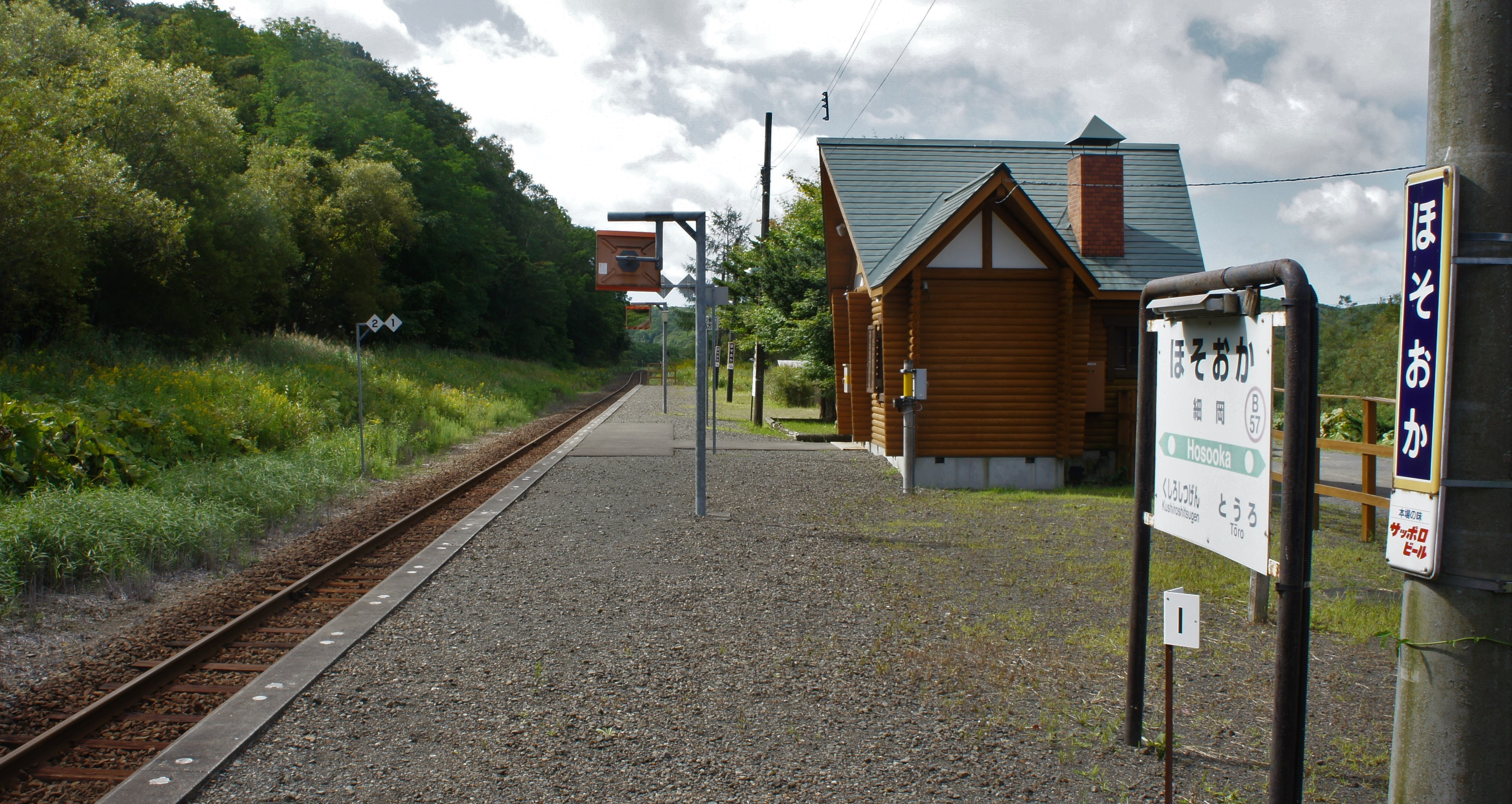
Platform

== History ==
The station opened on 15 September 1927 with the opening of the Ministry of Railways Senmō Main Line between Kushiro Station and Shibecha Station. Following the privatization of the Japanese National Railways on 1 April 1987, the station came under the control of JR Hokkaido. As of 18 March 2023 (Reiwa 5), it has been designated a temporary station and winter train stops have been discontinued

== Passenger statistics ==
In fiscal 2022, the station was used by an average of 0.2 passengers daily.

== Surrounding area ==
- Kushiro-shitsugen National Park

== See also ==
- List of railway stations in Japan
