= Tōya Station =

Tōya Station may refer to:

- Tōya Station (Kushiro) (遠矢駅), a railway station on the Senmō Main Line in Kushiro, Hokkaidō, Japan
- Tōya Station (Tōyako) (洞爺駅), a railway station on the Muroran Main Line in Tōyako, Abuta District, Hokkaidō, Japan
