= Kushiro (town) =

Kushiro 釧路町 Kushiro-chō
- Town
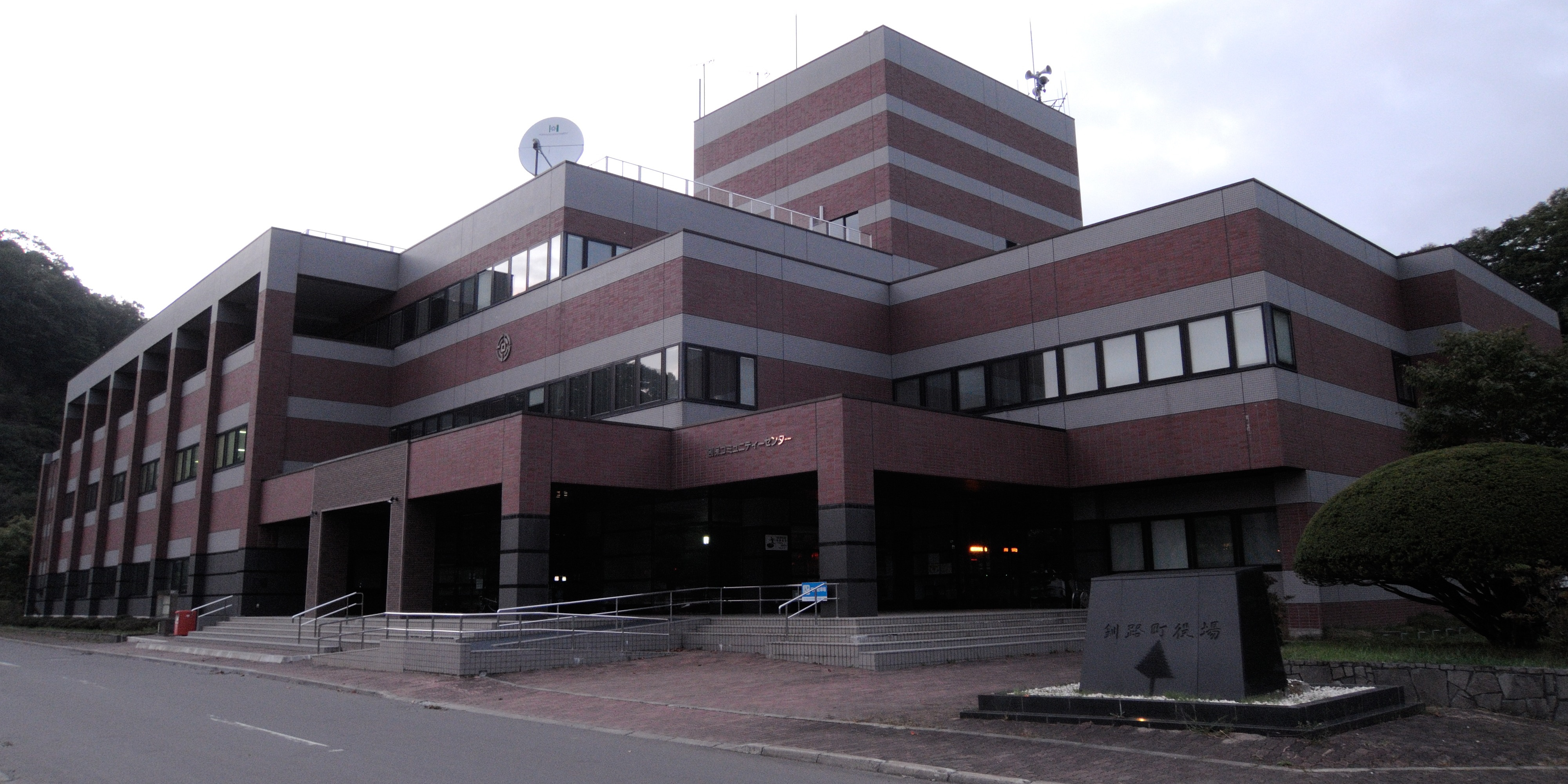
- Kushiro town hall

- Flag Emblem

- Location of Kushiro in Hokkaido (Kushiro Subprefecture)
- Interactive map of Kushiro
- Location within Japan
- Coordinates: 42°59′46″N 144°27′58″E
- Country: Japan
- Region: Hokkaido
- Prefecture: Hokkaido (Kushiro Subprefecture)
- District: Kushiro

Area
  - Total: 252.04 km^{2} (97.31 sq mi)

Population (November 31, 2025)
  - Total: 18,050
  - Density: 71.62/km^{2} (185.5/sq mi)
- Time zone: UTC+09:00 (JST)
- City hall address: 1-1 Beppo, Kushiro-cho, Kushiro-gun, Hokkaido 088-0692
- Climate: Dfb
- Website: www.town.kushiro.lg.jp
- Symbols
- Bird: Ural owl
- Flower: Miyamahanashinobu
- Tree: Manchurian Crab Apple

Kushiro (釧路町, Kushiro-chō) is a town located in Kushiro Subprefecture, Hokkaidō, Japan. As of 30 November 2025, the town had an estimated population of 18,050 in 9570 households, and a population density of 10.9 people per km^{2}. The total area of the town is 252.04 km^{2} (97.31 sq mi).

== Geography ==
Kushiro Town is located in southeastern Hokkaido, east of the city of the same name. It stretches 31.5 kilometers east-to-west and 20.4 kilometers north-to-south. Approximately 80% of the total area is mountainous, with undulating terrain around 100 meters above sea level, and approximately 20% is the Kushiro Plain and peat bogs in the west. The town is L-shaped, with its wide north–south west and narrow east. The Kushiro Wetlands, which stretches across one city and three towns, including Kushiro Town, is the largest marsh in Japan and became the first wetland in Japan to be registered under the Ramsar Convention in 1980. The northwestern part of the town is within the borders of the Kushiro-shitsugen National Park, and the southeastern part is within the borders of the Akkeshi Prefectural Natural Park.

=== Neighboring municipalities ===
  - Kushiro
  - Tsurui
  - Shibecha
  - Akkeshi

=== Climate ===
The climate is cool throughout the year, with sea fog causing short daylight hours and relatively low temperatures from spring to summer. Autumn is relatively warm with little precipitation and sunny days. Winter is also relatively warm with little snowfall and many sunny days, but temperatures are low. According to the Köppen climate classification, the area is classified as a subarctic climate with little winter rainfall (Dwb), which is rare in Japan.

Climate data for Kushiro District, Kushiro Town, Senposhi Village, elevation 149m
Month	Jan	Feb	Mar	Apr	May	Jun	Jul	Aug	Sep	Oct	Nov	Dec	Year
Record high °C (°F)	7.1 (44.8)	8.6 (47.5)	14.0 (57.2)	21.0 (69.8)	29.3 (84.7)	31.5 (88.7)	30.6 (87.1)	30.7 (87.3)	27.0 (80.6)	21.1 (70.0)	16.8 (62.2)	11.2 (52.2)	31.5 (88.7)
Mean daily maximum °C (°F)	−1.6 (29.1)	−1.7 (28.9)	1.3 (34.3)	6.1 (43.0)	10.9 (51.6)	14.1 (57.4)	18.0 (64.4)	19.9 (67.8)	18.1 (64.6)	13.4 (56.1)	7.6 (45.7)	1.5 (34.7)	9.0 (48.2)
Daily mean °C (°F)	−4.5 (23.9)	−4.7 (23.5)	−1.5 (29.3)	2.8 (37.0)	7.2 (45.0)	10.8 (51.4)	14.9 (58.8)	16.9 (62.4)	15.3 (59.5)	10.7 (51.3)	4.6 (40.3)	−1.6 (29.1)	5.9 (42.6)
Mean daily minimum °C (°F)	−7.9 (17.8)	−8.1 (17.4)	−4.5 (23.9)	0.0 (32.0)	4.3 (39.7)	8.2 (46.8)	12.5 (54.5)	14.7 (58.5)	12.8 (55.0)	7.5 (45.5)	1.2 (34.2)	−4.9 (23.2)	3.0 (37.4)
Record low °C (°F)	−17.8 (0.0)	−17.7 (0.1)	−17.4 (0.7)	−8.3 (17.1)	−4.5 (23.9)	0.5 (32.9)	4.2 (39.6)	7.5 (45.5)	4.6 (40.3)	−1.5 (29.3)	−10.8 (12.6)	−13.9 (7.0)	−17.8 (0.0)
Average precipitation mm (inches)	21.7 (0.85)	14.4 (0.57)	42.5 (1.67)	67.9 (2.67)	98.8 (3.89)	108.8 (4.28)	130.2 (5.13)	138.0 (5.43)	166.0 (6.54)	117.9 (4.64)	63.4 (2.50)	47.4 (1.87)	1,009.2 (39.73)
Average precipitation days (≥ 1.0 mm)	4.1	3.7	5.9	8.5	10.0	9.9	11.2	11.5	10.9	8.6	8.2	6.5	98.1
Mean monthly sunshine hours	192.1	192.5	209.9	188.1	180.2	131.1	112.6	122.1	144.5	175.6	174.0	178.6	2,001.7
Source: JMA（平均値：1991年 - 2020年、極値：1978年 - 現在）

=== Demographics ===
Per Japanese census data, the population of Kushiro Town has remained relatively steady in recent decades.

Historical population
Year	Pop.	±%
1970	7,492	—
1980	13,123	+75.2%
1990	19,008	+44.8%
2000	22,478	+18.3%
2010	20,529	−8.7%
2020	19,105	−6.9%

== History ==
- 1870 (Meiji 3): Sano Magoemon of Saga Domain relocated 170 households (637 people) of fishermen to Kushiro Village (present-day Kushiro City), Konbumori Village, Atonaga Village, and Senposhi Village.
- 1880 (Meiji 13): Headman's offices were established in Konbumori Village and two other villages.
- 1890 (Meiji 23): Yamagata Yuzaburo opens the private Yamagata Educational Institute on his own ranch (the predecessor to Kushiro Town Beppo Elementary School).
- 1892 (Meiji 25): 20 households from Gunma Prefecture move to Toya.
- 1896 (Meiji 29): Yamagata Coal Mine (later Beppo Coal Mine → Mitsui Mining Kushiro Coal Mine Beppo Ichitake → Pacific Coal Mine Beppo Ichitake) opens (closed in 1949).
- 1901 (Meiji 34): Hokkaido's first paper mill (Maeda Paper) began operations (the following year it was reorganized as Hokkai Paper Mill, and in 1906 (Meiji 39) became Fuji Paper's fourth mill). The mill burned down in 1913.
- 1906 (Meiji 39): Coal mining began at Beppo Coal Mine (later Mitsui Mining Kushiro Coal Mine Beppo Second Pile → Pacific Coal Mine Beppo Second Pit) (closed in 1949).
- 1913 (Taisho 2): Seven households from Soma County, Fukushima Prefecture, moved to Kamibeppo to develop the area.
- 1919 (Taisho 8): With the implementation of the Hokkaido Second-Class Town and Village System, Konbumori Village was re-established from the areas of Konbumori, Atonaga, and Senposhi.
- 1920 (Taisho 9): With the implementation of the district system in Kushiro Town (now Kushiro City), Kushiro Village was separated.
- 1945 (Showa 20): The area was attacked by U.S. air raids (Hokkaido Air Raids).
- 1955 (Showa 30): Konbumori Village and Kushiro Village merged to form the new Kushiro Village.
- 1959 (Showa 34): The new town hall was completed.
- 1968 (Showa 43): The coastal area from Cape Shiri to Kiritsuga was incorporated into the Akkeshi Prefectural Natural Park.
- 1972 (Showa 47): The Miyama Coal Mine closed, eliminating all coal mines from Kushiro Village.
- 1980 (Showa 55): The town was incorporated as Kushiro Town. The Kushiro Wetlands are designated as a Ramsar Convention-registered wetland.
- 1987 (Showa 62): The Kushiro Wetlands are designated as a national park (Kushiro Wetlands National Park).
- 1988 (Showa 63): The new town hall building is completed.

== Government ==
Kushiro Town has a mayor-council form of government with a directly elected mayor and a unicameral town council of 16 members. Kushiro Town, as part of Kushiro Subprefecture, contributes one member to the Hokkaidō Prefectural Assembly. In terms of national politics, the town is part of the Hokkaidō 7th district of the lower house of the Diet of Japan.

== Economy ==
Kushiro town is divided into five districts. The Beppo district once prospered as a coal mining district, and is now the administrative center with the town hall and fire station. The Toya district has community facilities utilizing the Kushiro Wetlands, and agricultural production includes daikon radishes, turnips, carrots, spinach, and broccoli. The Setchirifuto district, adjacent to Kushiro City, has developed as a commuter town for the city. In the Toyo and Chuo districts, a land readjustment project was implemented in 1992, resulting in the expansion of condominiums and stores along the national highway. The Konbumori district is centered on commercial fishing, with Konbumori Fishing Port, Ojamai Fishing Port, and Senposhi Fishing Port. In addition to kelp, salmon, and trout fishing, the area also produces oysters, surf clams, and sea urchins.

== Education ==
Kushiro has five public elementary schools and four public middle schools operated by the town government and one public high school operated by the Hokkaido Board of Education.

== Transportation ==
JR Hokkaido - Nemuro Main Line

■ Beppo

JR Hokkaido - Senmō Main Line

■ Hosooka - Kushiro-Shitsugen - Tōya

=== Highways ===
- Kushiro Sotokan Road – Kushiro East IC - Kushiro Beppo IC
- National Route 44
- National Route 272
- National Route 391

== Local attractions ==
- Kushiro Wetlands
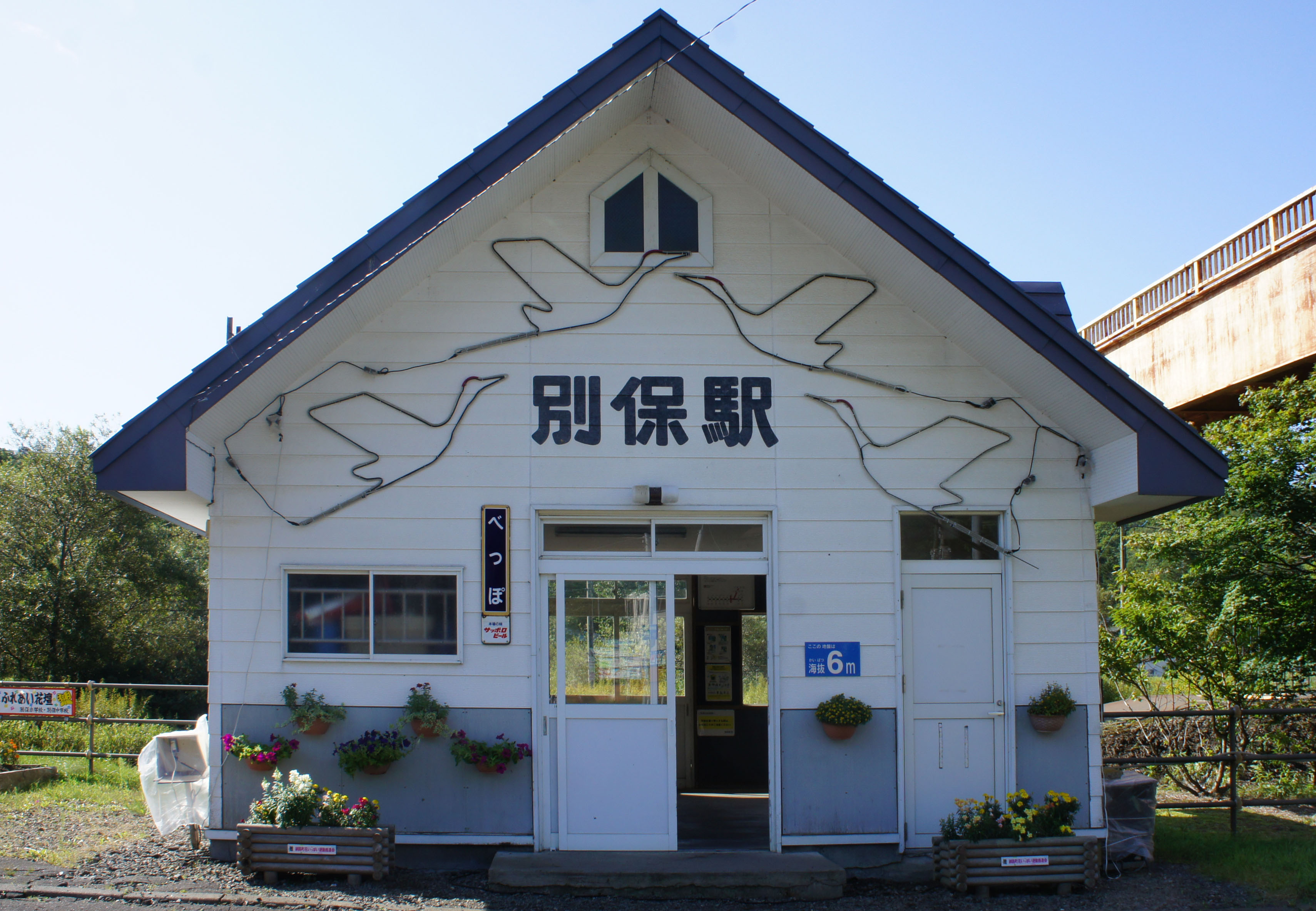
Beppo railway station

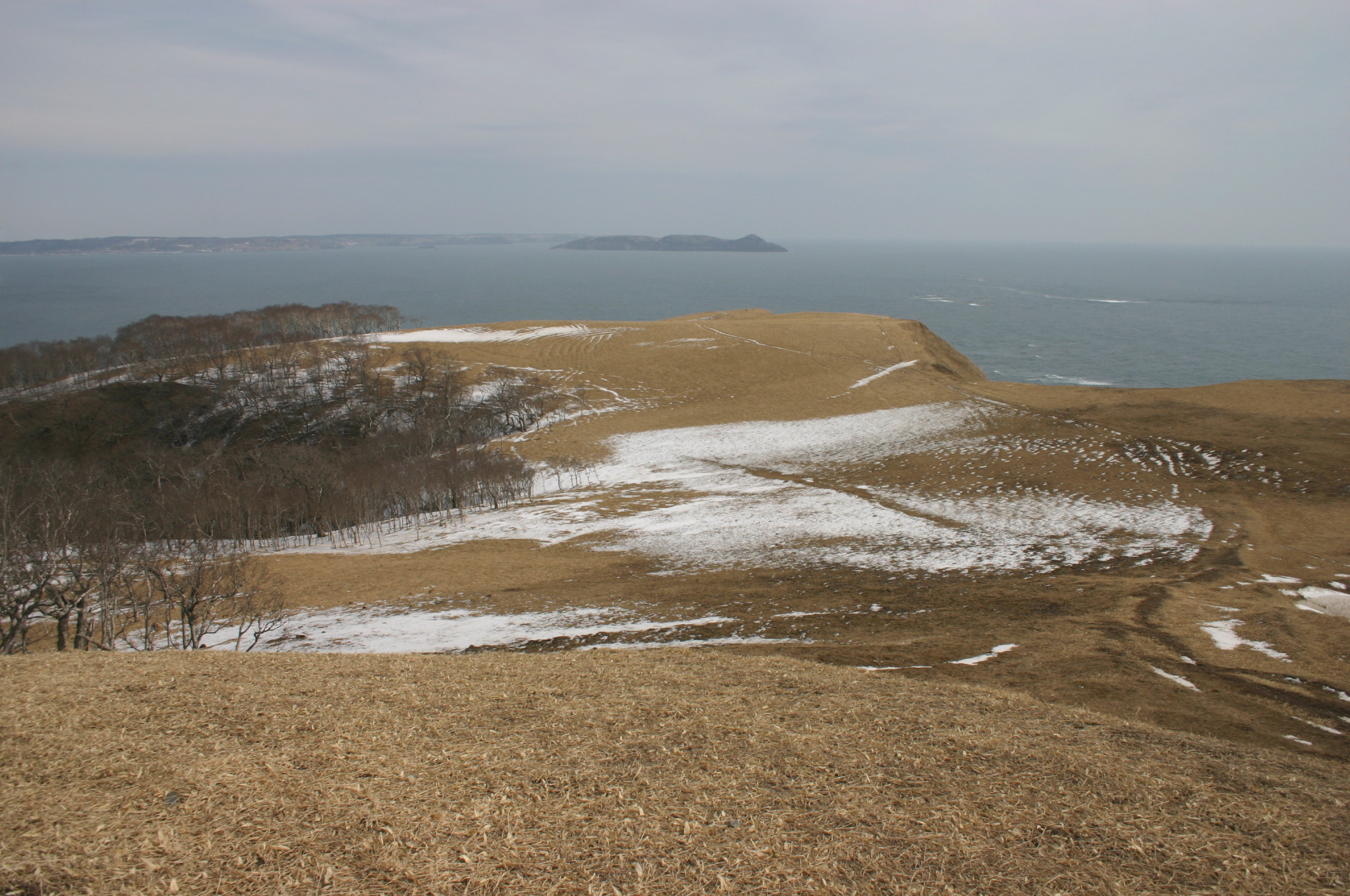
Cape Shirepa

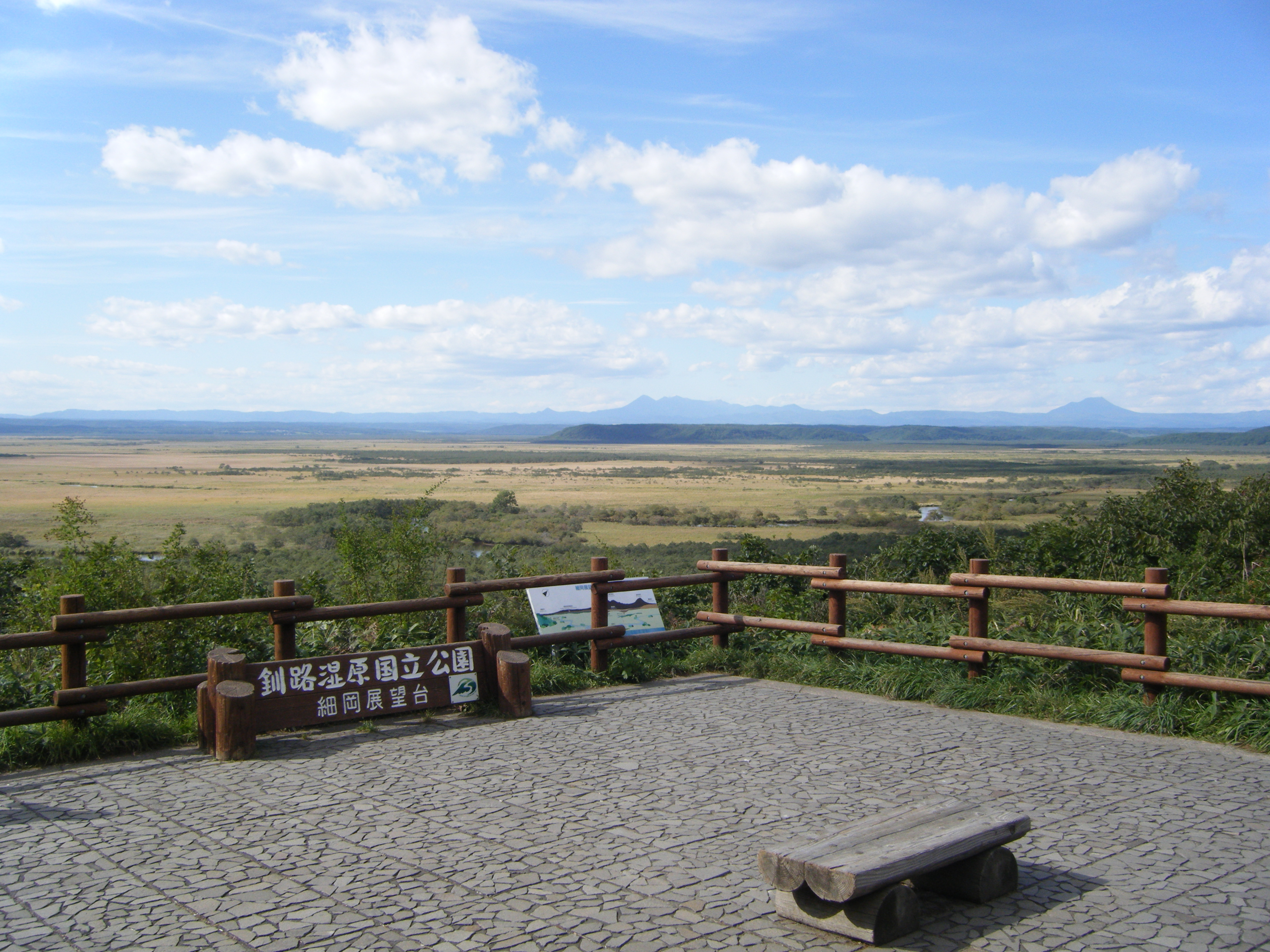
Kushiro wetlands

== Mascots ==
Kushiro's mascots is Milkcook (ミルクック, Mirukukku) and Kurobe Happy (ハッピーくろべえ, Happī Kurobe). They are bovines with a strong sense of justice.

- Milkcook is a mild-mannered dairy cow. She is a chef who can cook fast. She will moo if she fails to cook something good. As a result of her cooking skills, she promotes hospitality in the town while promoting the importance of milk. She became mascot in Spring 2006.
- Kurobe Happy is an optimistic bull who loves matsuris. He wears a blue happi. As a result of his fascination of festivals, he promotes events in the town while promoting the importance of beef. He became mascot during the 2011 Fall Matsuri.
