= Kushiro-Shitsugen Station =

Railway station in Kushiro Town, Hokkaido, Japan

B56 Kushiro-Shitsugen Station 釧路湿原駅
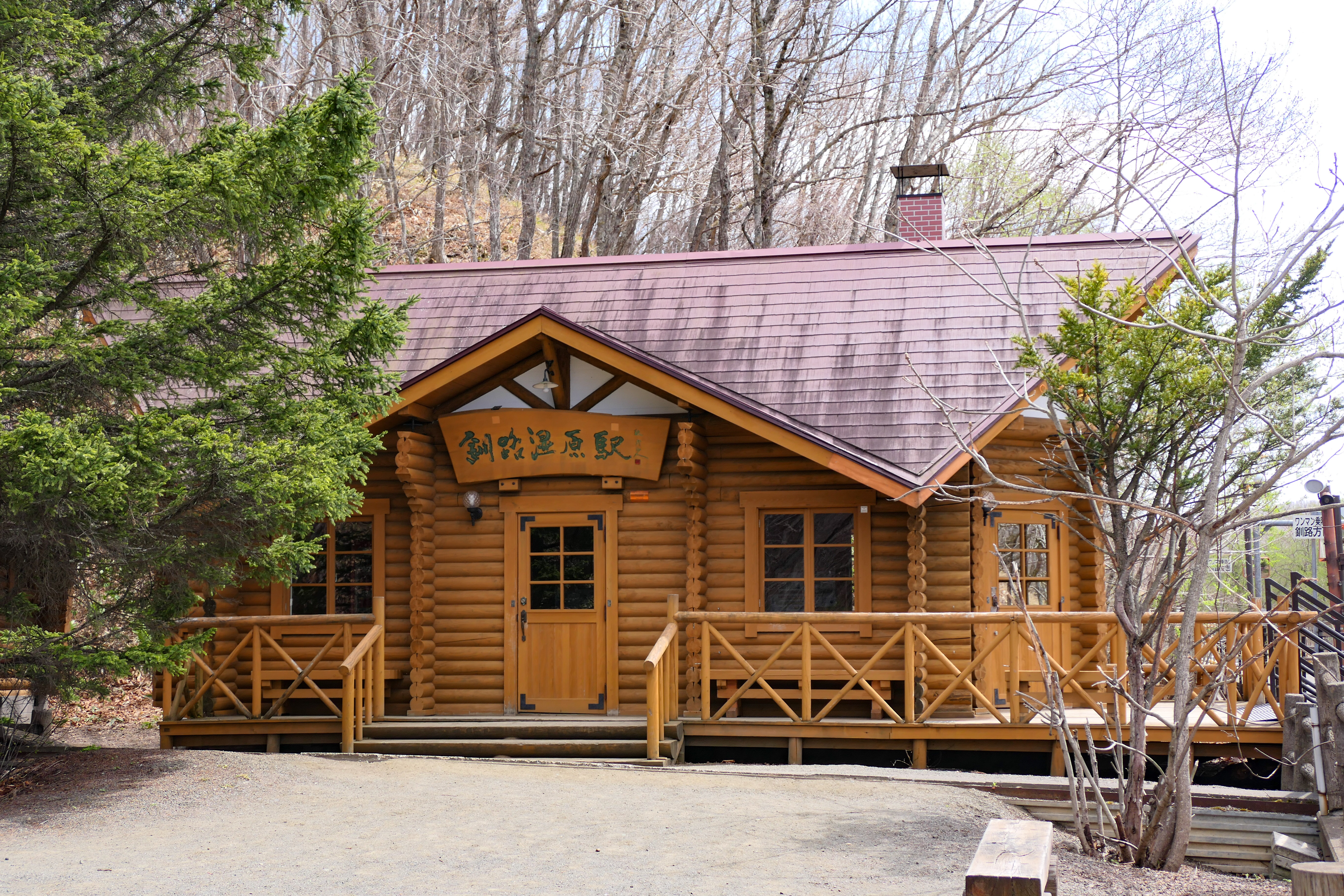
- Kushiro-Shitsugen Station station building in March 2021

General information
- Location: Minami 5 Sen Toritōshigenya, Kushiro-cho, Kushiro-gun, Hokkaido 088-0600; Japan
- Coordinates: 43°6′2.3″N 144°26′52.4″E
- System: regional rail
- Operator: JR Hokkaido
- Line: Senmō Main Line
- Distance: 14.7 km from Higashi-Kushiro
- Platforms: 1 side platform
- Tracks: 1

Other information
- Status: Unstaffed
- Station code: B56
- Website: Official website

History
- Opened: 23 July 1988; 38 years ago

Passengers
- FY2022: 12 daily

Services
| Preceding station | JR Hokkaido | Following station |
|---|---|---|
| Hosooka towards Abashiri | Senmō Main Line Local | Tōya towards Kushiro |
Location
- Location within Hokkaido Location within Japan

Kushiro-Shitsugen Station (釧路湿原駅, Kushiro-Shitsugen-eki) is a railway station located in the town of Kushiro, Hokkaidō, Japan. It is operated by JR Hokkaido.

== Lines ==
The station is served by the Senmō Main Line, and lies 14.7 km from the starting point of the line at Higashi-Kushiro .

== Layout ==
Kushiro-Shitsugen Station has one side platform serving bidirectional traffic. The station building is a larch log cabin that opened to coincide with the station's opening, and its roof is designed to resemble a red-crowned crane with its wings spread. The station is unattended.

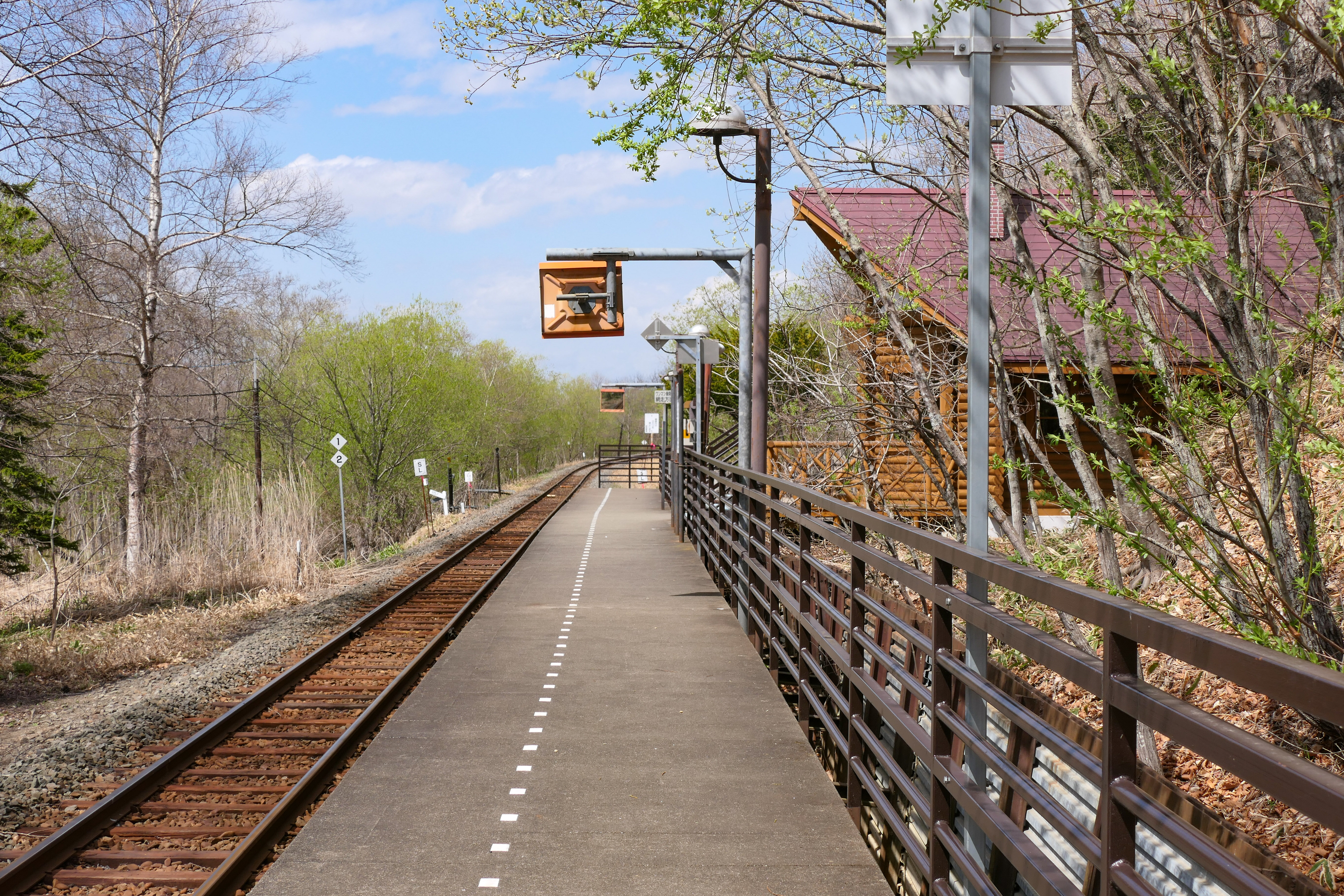
Platform

== History ==
The station opened on 23 July 1988 as a temporary station (open in summer and autumn) in conjunction with the opening of Kushiro-shitsugen National Park. It was elevated to a permanent station on 1 December 1996.

== Passenger statistics ==
In fiscal 2022, the station was used by an average of 5 passengers daily.

== Surrounding area ==
- Kushiro-shitsugen National Park

== See also ==
- List of railway stations in Japan
