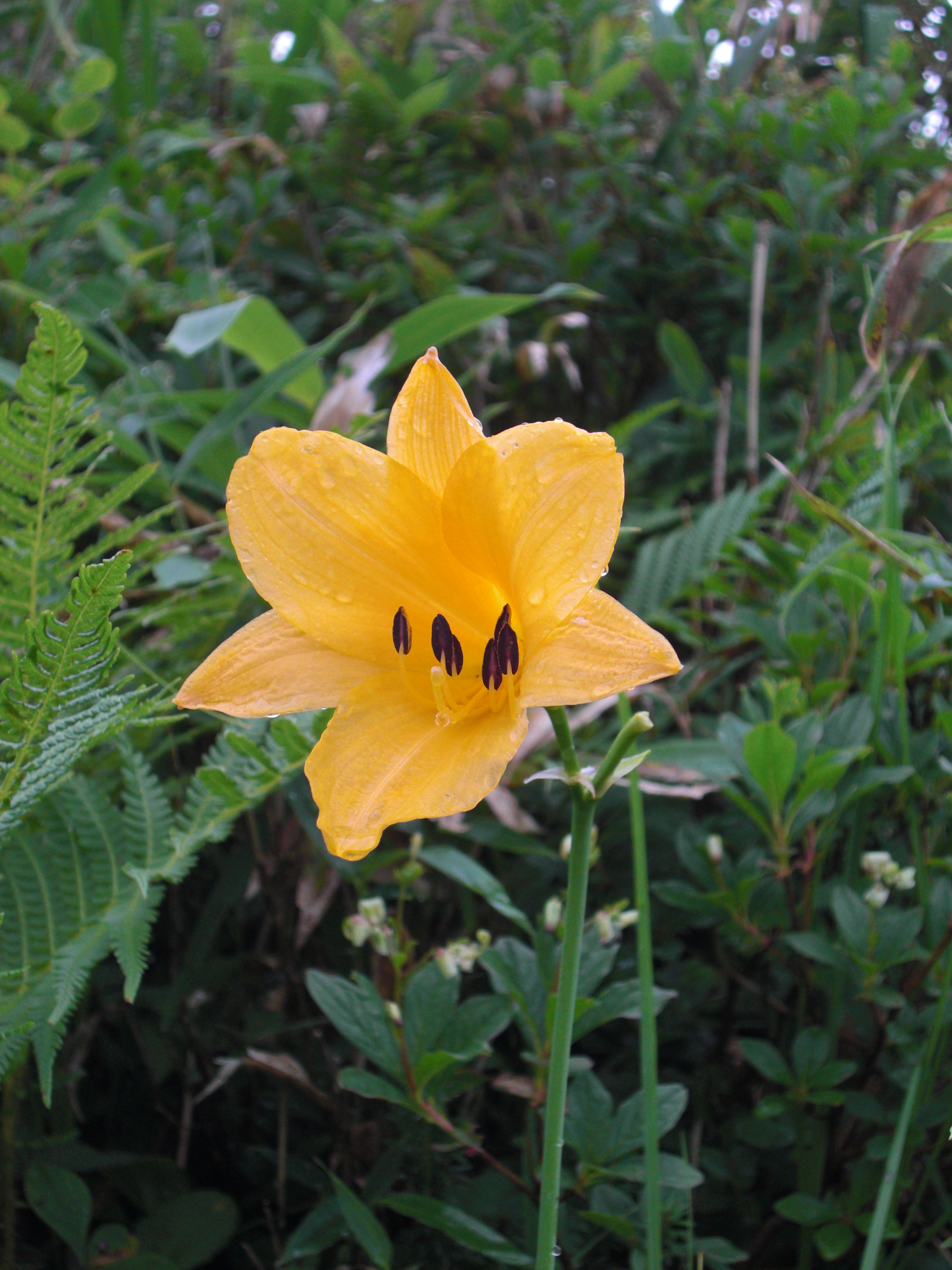
- In the Hida Mountains, Gifu Prefecture

Scientific classification
- Kingdom: Plantae
- Clade: Tracheophytes
- Clade: Angiosperms
- Clade: Monocots
- Order: Asparagales
- Family: Asphodelaceae
- Subfamily: Hemerocallidoideae
- Genus: Hemerocallis
- Species: H. middendorffii
- Variety: H. m. var. esculenta

Trinomial name
- Hemerocallis middendorffii var. esculenta Koidz.

Synonyms
- Hemerocallis esculenta Koidz.; Hemerocallis pedicellata Nakai

= Hemerocallis middendorffii var. esculenta =

Variety of flowering plant

Hemerocallis middendorffii var. esculenta (synonym Hemerocallis esculenta) known as nikkōkisuge or zenteika (in Japanese: 日光黄菅 or 禅庭花) is a perennial plant belonging to the family Asphodelaceae. It is native to Japan. Its yellow flower blooms in early summer, especially in the highlands of Japan in large groups.

== Distribution ==
Some of the places where nikkōkisuge grows include:

- Kirifuri Highland, Nikkō, Tochigi Prefecture
- Numappara Shitsugen (Wetland), Nasushiobara, Tochigi Prefecture
- Lake Oguni, Fukushima Prefecture
- Lake Nozori, Gunma Prefecture
- Ozegahara, in Gunnma Prefecture, Nagano Prefecture and Niigata Prefecture Prefectures
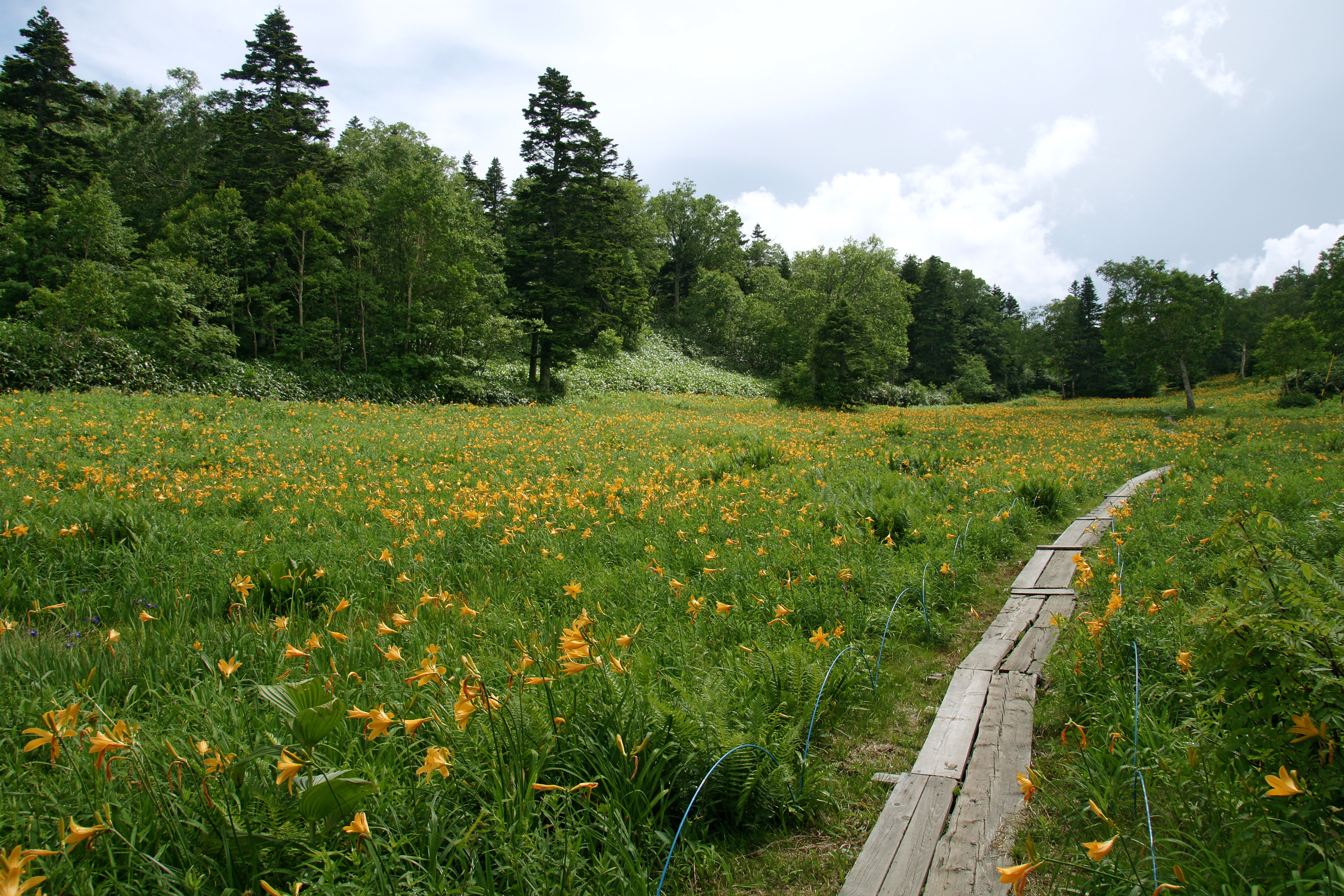
Nikkōkisuge in the Shiga Highlands, Nagano Prefecture
