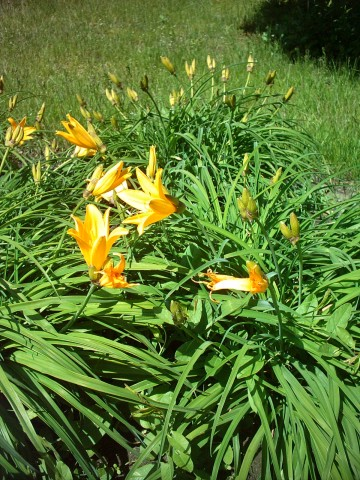
- Hemerocallis middendorffii var. middendorffii

Scientific classification
- Kingdom: Plantae
- Clade: Tracheophytes
- Clade: Angiosperms
- Clade: Monocots
- Order: Asparagales
- Family: Asphodelaceae
- Subfamily: Hemerocallidoideae
- Genus: Hemerocallis
- Species: H. middendorffii

Binomial name
- Hemerocallis middendorffii Trautv. & C.A.Mey.

= Hemerocallis middendorffii =

Species of flowering plant

Hemerocallis middendorffii, known as Amur daylily, is a plant species in the subfamily Hemerocallidoideae of the family Asphodelaceae of the order Asparagales. It is native to the Russian Far East, northwest China, Korea, and Japan. It grows in meadows, mountain slopes, open woods, and scrub. It is cultivated in Asia for its edible flowers.

== Description ==
Herbaceous perennial with linear arching leaves to 60 cm (24 in). Flower scapes 20–90 cm (8–35 in). Flowers 5–6, golden yellow to clear orange, large in a terminal head. Flowers in July for 2–3 weeks and often reblooms in September.

Four varieties are recognized:

- H. middendorffii var. middendorfii: To 90 cm (35 in). Flowers orange, odorless with elliptic to spathulate tepals. Bracts ovate, 2–2.5 cm (3/4–1 in). The range of the species.
- H. middendorffii var. esculenta (Koidz.) Ohwi: Japan
- H. middendorffii var. exaltata (Stout) M.Hotta: Japan
- H. middendorffii var. longibracteata Xiong: 20–35 cm (8–14 in). Flowers yellow, fragrant with lanceolate tepals. Bracts ovate-lanceolate, 3–6 cm (1 1/4–2 1/4 in). Endemic to China.

== Cultivation ==
Easily cultivated on moist soil in a sunny site, but can tolerate poor soil and partial shade. Propagated by division and by seed. Takes 2–3 years to flower from seed.

Plants prefer a neutral to slightly acid soil and will suffer in very acid or alkaline soils. Generally free from pests and diseases. Hardy to USDA zone 4.
