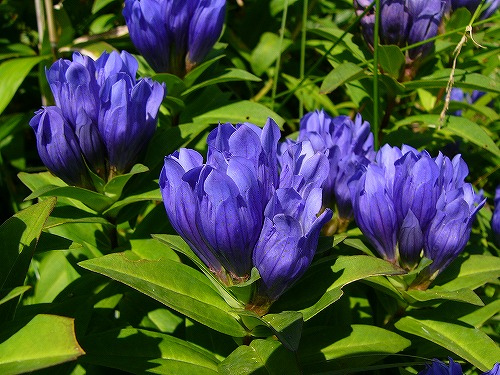

Scientific classification
- Kingdom: Plantae
- Clade: Tracheophytes
- Clade: Angiosperms
- Clade: Eudicots
- Clade: Asterids
- Order: Gentianales
- Family: Gentianaceae
- Genus: Gentiana
- Species: G. triflora

Binomial name
- Gentiana triflora Pall.

= Gentiana triflora =

Species of plant

Gentiana triflora (三花龙胆 san hua long dan in Chinese, called clustered gentian in English) is a tall, flowering perennial plant in the genus Gentiana native to higher-elevation (600–1000 m) meadows and forests of China (Hebei, Heilongjiang, Jilin, Liaoning, Nei Mongol), Mongolia, Eastern Russia, Korea and Japan.

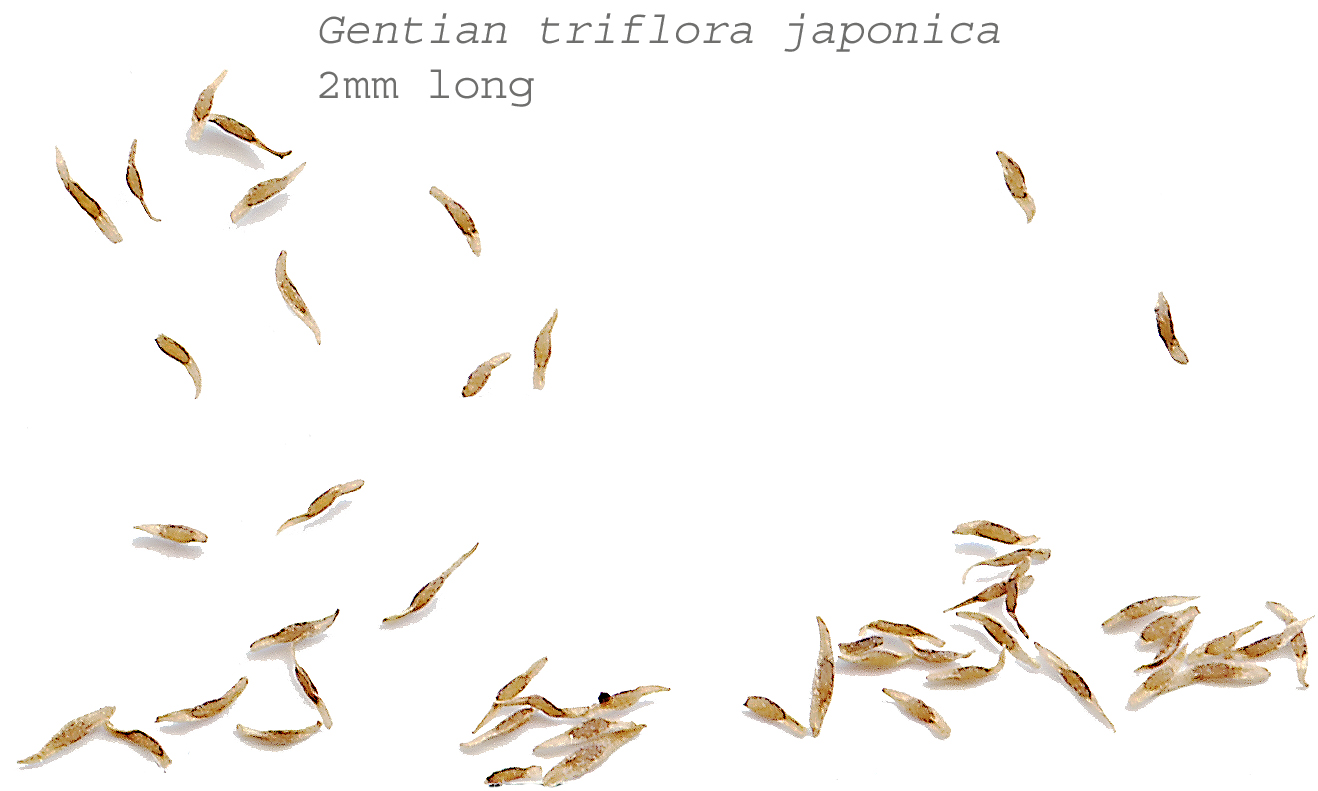
seeds

Gentian blue petals predominantly contain the unusually blue and stable anthocyanin gentiodelphin (delphinidin 3-O-glucosyl-5-O-(6-O-caffeoyl-glucosyl)-3′-O-(6-O-caffeoyl-glucoside)).
