= Kushiro District, Hokkaido =

District in Hokkaido, Japan

Coordinates: 43.029°N 144.502°E

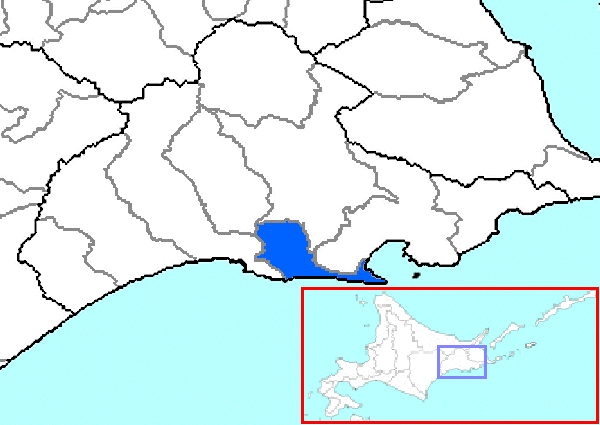
The area of Kushiro District in Kushiro Subprefecture.

Kushiro (釧路郡, Kushiro-gun) is a district in Kushiro Subprefecture, Hokkaido. Kushiro is also the name of the adjacent city Kushiro, Hokkaido.

== Towns ==
- Kushiro

== History ==
- August 1, 1922 Kushiro-ku becomes Kushiro City, leaving the district
- October 10, 1949 Tottori Town (鳥取町) merges with Kushiro City
