= Akkeshi District, Hokkaido =

District in Hokkaido, Japan

Coordinates: 43.135743°N 144.916261°E

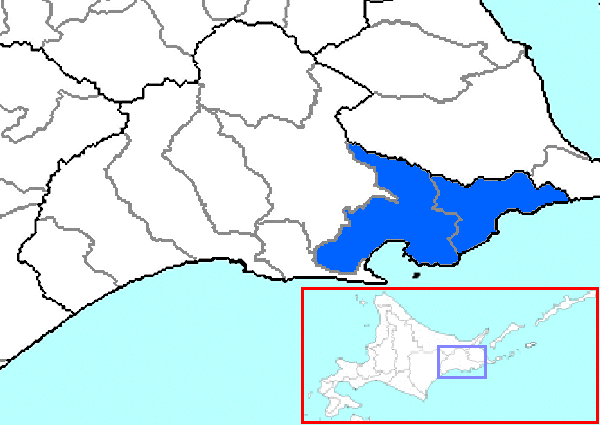
The area of Akkeshi District in Kushiro Subprefecture.

Akkeshi (厚岸郡, Akkeshi-gun) is a district in eastern Kushiro Subprefecture, Hokkaidō, Japan.

== Towns ==
- Akkeshi
- Hamanaka
