= Sharidake Prefectural Natural Park =

Natural park in Hokkaido, Japan

Coordinates: 43.7656°N 144.7178°E

- 斜里岳道立自然公園
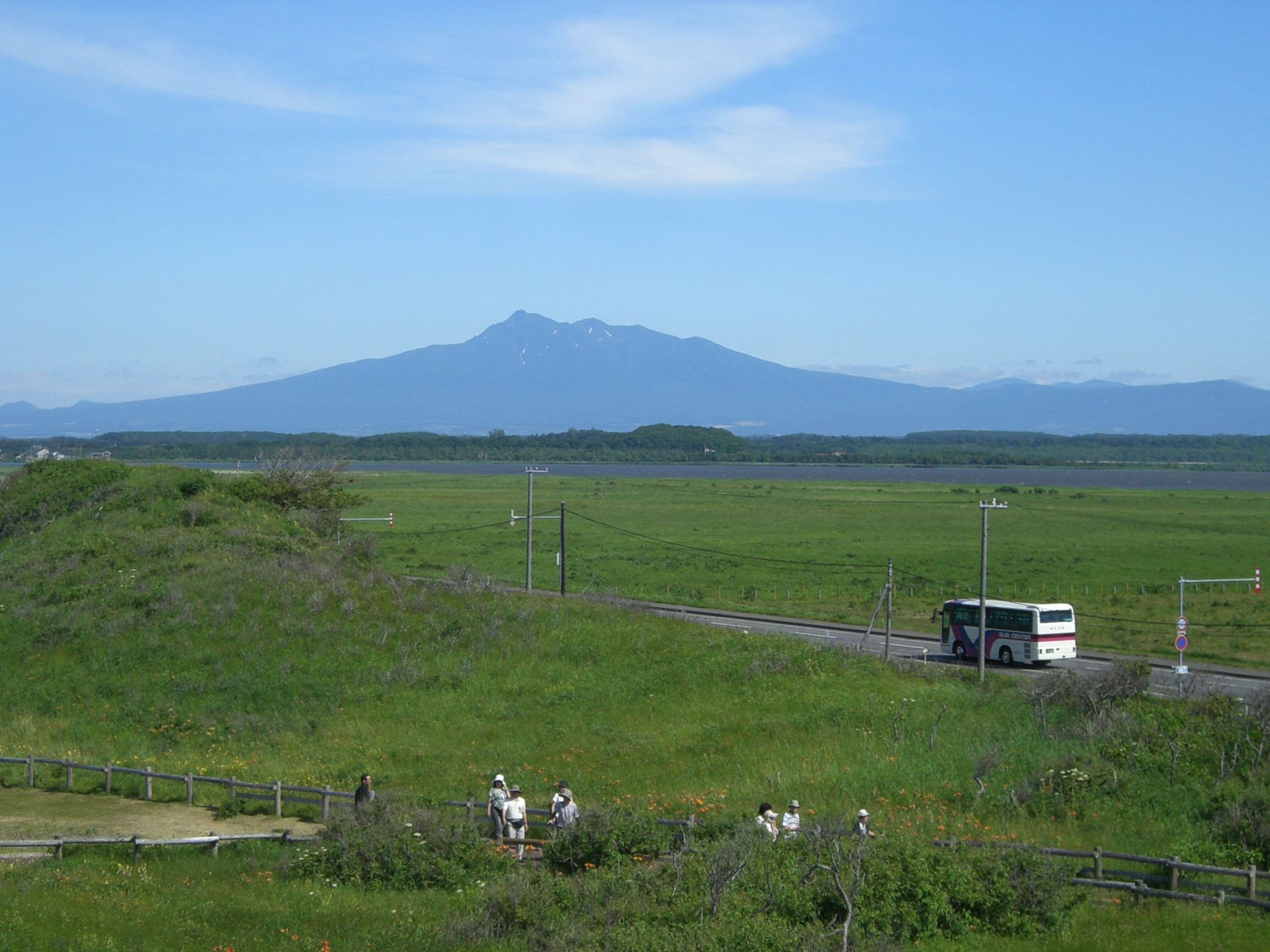
- Mount Shari
- Interactive map of Sharidake Prefectural Natural Park
- Location: Hokkaidō, Japan
- Area: 29.79 km^{2} (11.50 sq mi)
- Established: 13 November 1980

Sharidake Prefectural Natural Park (斜里岳道立自然公園, Sharidake dōritsu shizen kōen) is a Prefectural Natural Park in eastern Hokkaidō, Japan. Established in 1980, the park spans the municipalities of Kiyosato, Shari, and Shibetsu.

== See also ==
- National Parks of Japan
