= Kiyosatochō Station =

Railway station in Kiyosato, Hokkaido, Japan

Coordinates: 43.8388°N 144.5941°E

Kiyosatochō Station 清里町駅
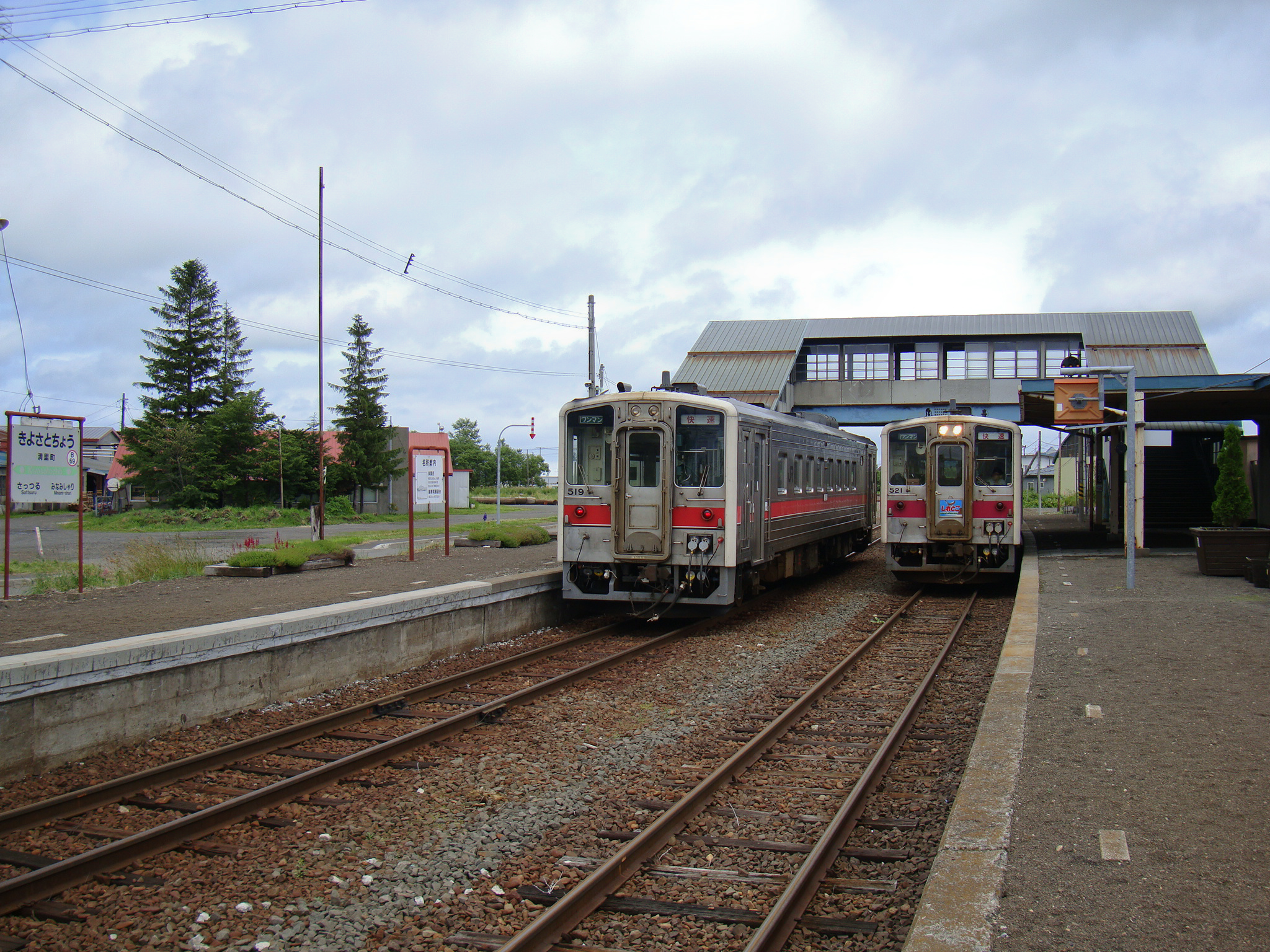
- Kiyosatochō Station platform

General information
- Location: Mizumotomachi, Kiyosato, Shari, Hokkaido; Japan
- Operator: Hokkaido Railway Company
- Line: Senmō Main Line
- Platforms: Side platform

Other information
- Station code: B-69

History
- Opened: 1929; 97 years ago
Location

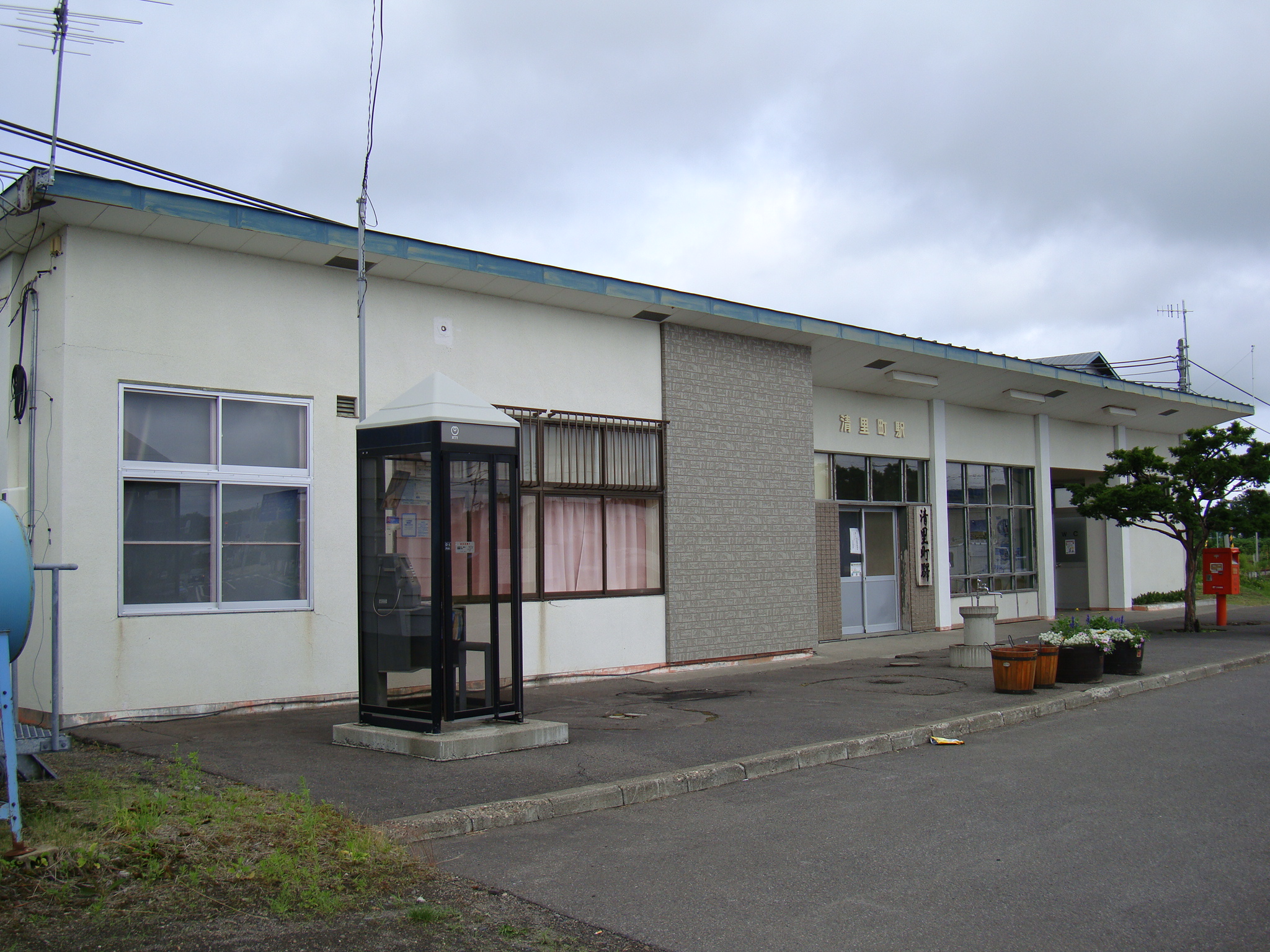
Station building

Kiyosatochō Station (Japanese: 清里町駅, Hepburn: Kiyosatochō-eki) is a railway station on the Senmō Main Line in Kiyosato, Hokkaido, Japan, operated by the Hokkaido Railway Company (JR Hokkaido). Kiyosatochō Station is served by the Senmō Main Line, and is numbered B69.

== Adjacent stations ==
«	Service	»
Senmō Main Line
Naka-Shari	Rapid Shiretoko	Sattsuru
Naka-Shari	Local	Sattsuru
