= Sattsuru Station =

Railway station in Kiyosato, Hokkaido, Japan

Coordinates: 43.7863°N 144.5313°E

Sattsuru Station 札弦駅
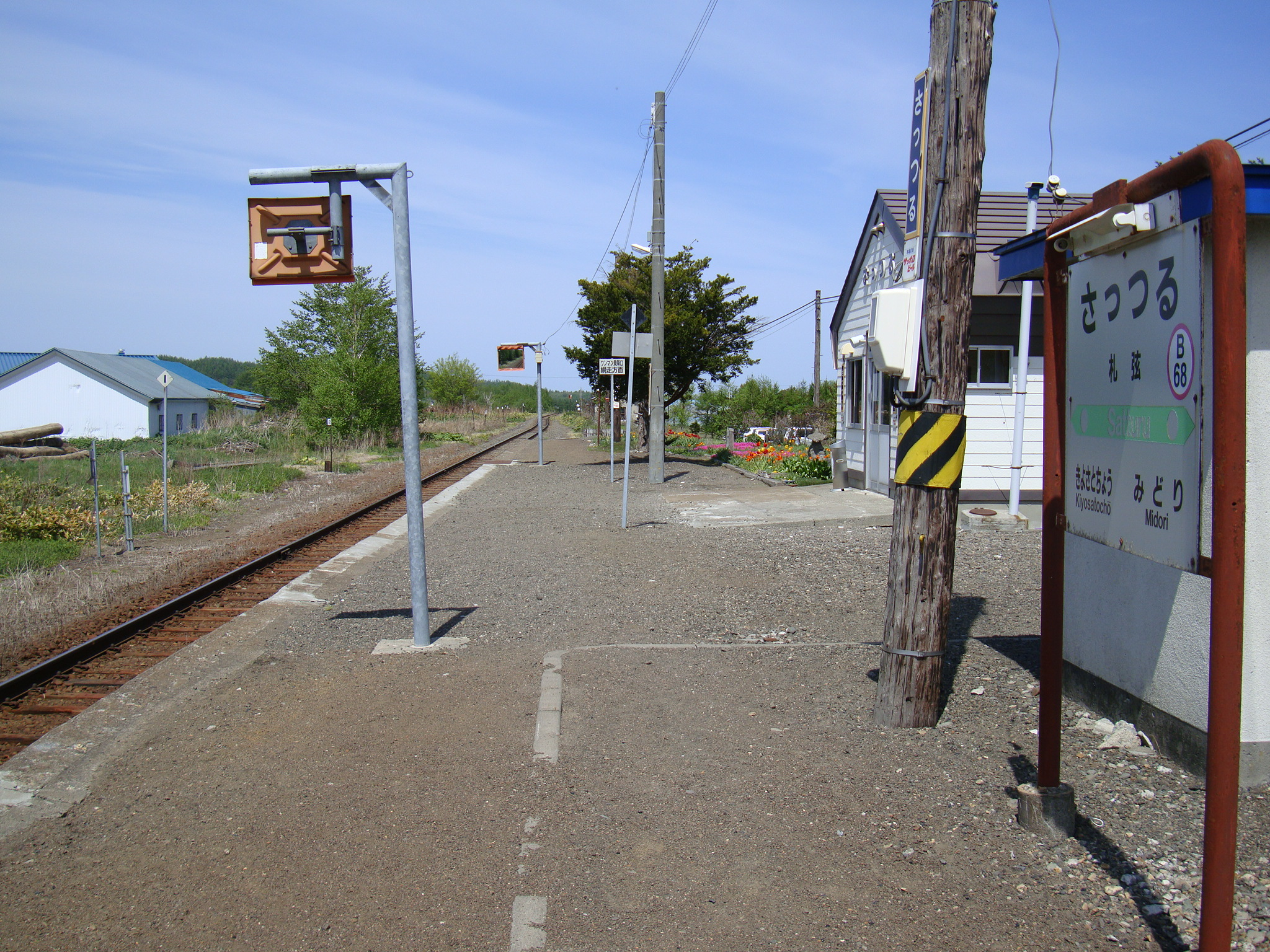
- Sattsuru Station platform

General information
- Location: Sattsurumachi, Kiyosato, Shari, Hokkaido; Japan
- Operator: Hokkaido Railway Company
- Line: ■ Senmō Main Line
- Distance: 57.0 km from Abashiri
- Platforms: 1 Side platform

Other information
- Status: Unstaffed
- Station code: B-68

History
- Opened: November 4, 1929; 96 years ago

Passengers
- 2014: 18 daily
Location

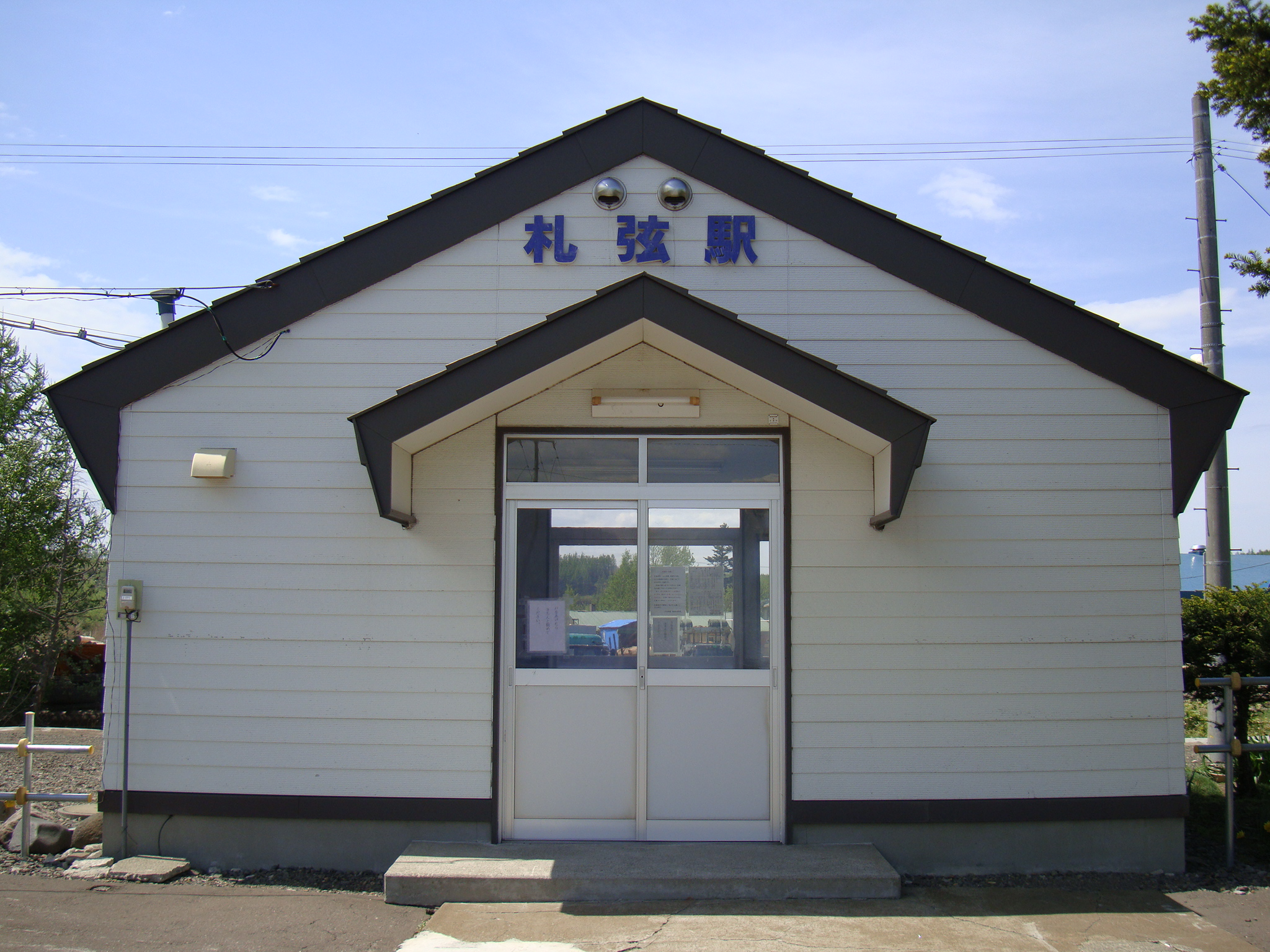
Station building

Sattsuru Station (札弦駅, Sattsuru-eki) is a railway station on the Senmō Main Line in Kiyosato, Hokkaido, Japan, operated by the Hokkaido Railway Company (JR Hokkaido).

== Lines ==
Sattsuru Station is served by the Senmō Main Line, and is numbered B68.

== Adjacent stations ==
«	Service	»
Senmō Main Line
Kiyosatochō	Rapid Shiretoko	Midori
Kiyosatochō	Local	Midori
