= Mount Shari =

Quaternary stratovolcano on the island of Hokkaido, Japan

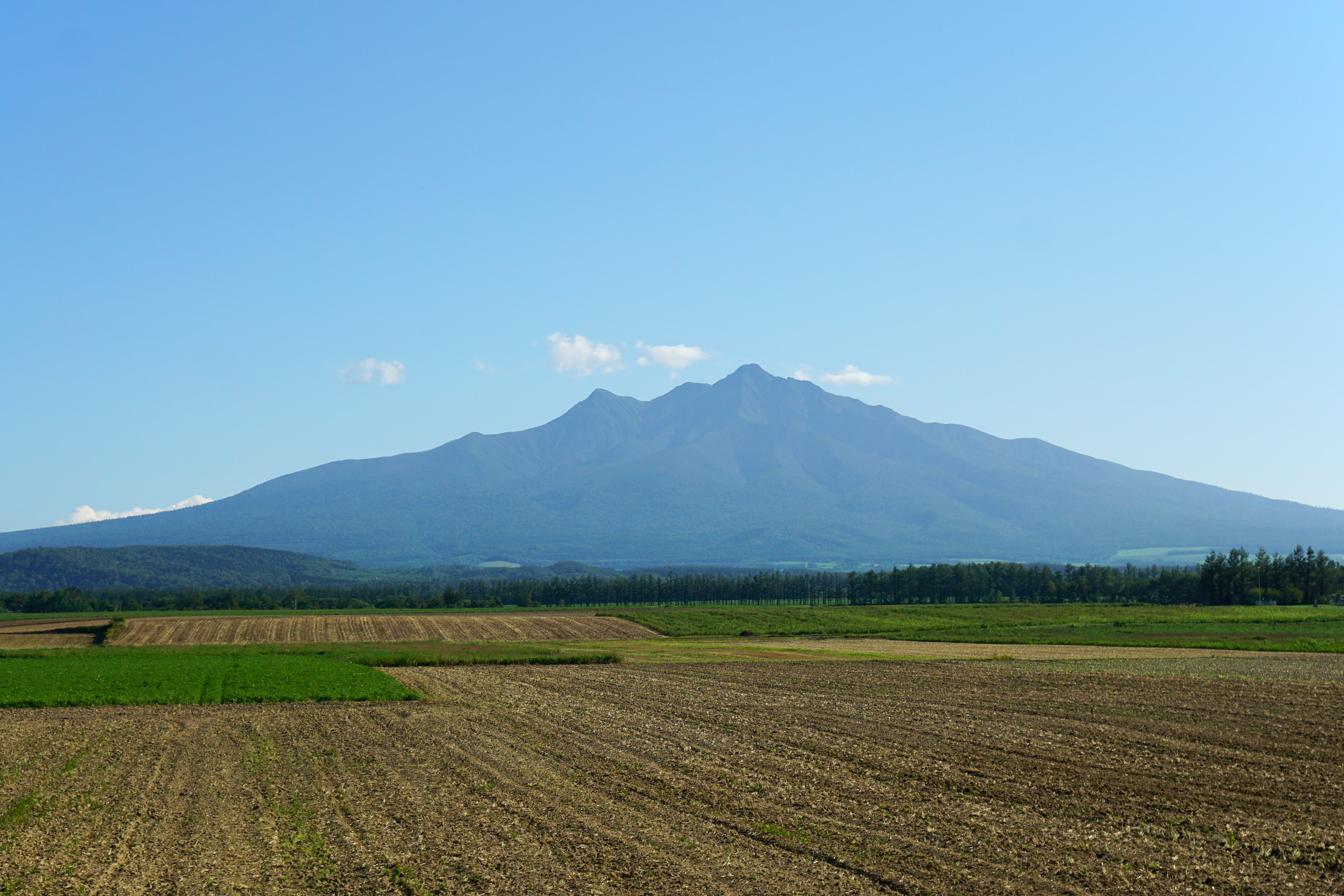
- Mount Shari seen from Shari-cho, August 2014.

Highest point
- Elevation: 1,547 m (5,075 ft)
- Prominence: 1,070 m (3,510 ft)
- Listing: 100 Famous Japanese Mountains; List of mountains and hills of Japan by height, Ribu
- Coordinates: 43°45′56″N 144°43′5″E

Naming
- Native name: 斜里岳 (Japanese)
- Pronunciation: Japanese: [ɕaɾidake]

Geography
- Location within Japan
- Location: Hokkaido, Japan
- Parent range: Shiretoko Mountains
- Topo map(s): Geospatial Information Authority 25000:1 斜里岳; 50000:1 斜里

Geology
- Rock age: Quaternary
- Mountain type(s): Stratovolcano, Lava dome
- Volcanic arc: Kurile arc
- Last eruption: ca. 0.3-0.25 million years ago

Climbing
- Easiest route: Hike

Mount Shari (斜里岳, Shari-dake) is a quaternary stratovolcano and one of Japan's 100 famous mountains. Its summit is 1,547 metres (5,075 ft). The summit consists of Mount Shari, Southern Mount Shari (南斜里岳, minamishari-dake) and the western ridge. It is located on Hokkaido's Shiretoko Peninsula on the border of Shari and Kiyosato in Shari District, Okhotsk and Shibetsu in Shibetsu District, Nemuro.

== Naming ==
Its former name in the Ainu language was Onnenupuri. The name Shari in Ainu means marshes where reeds are growing. It is also known by the names Okhotsk Fuji (オホーツク富士, ohōtsuku fuji) or Shari Fuji (斜里富士, shari fuji).

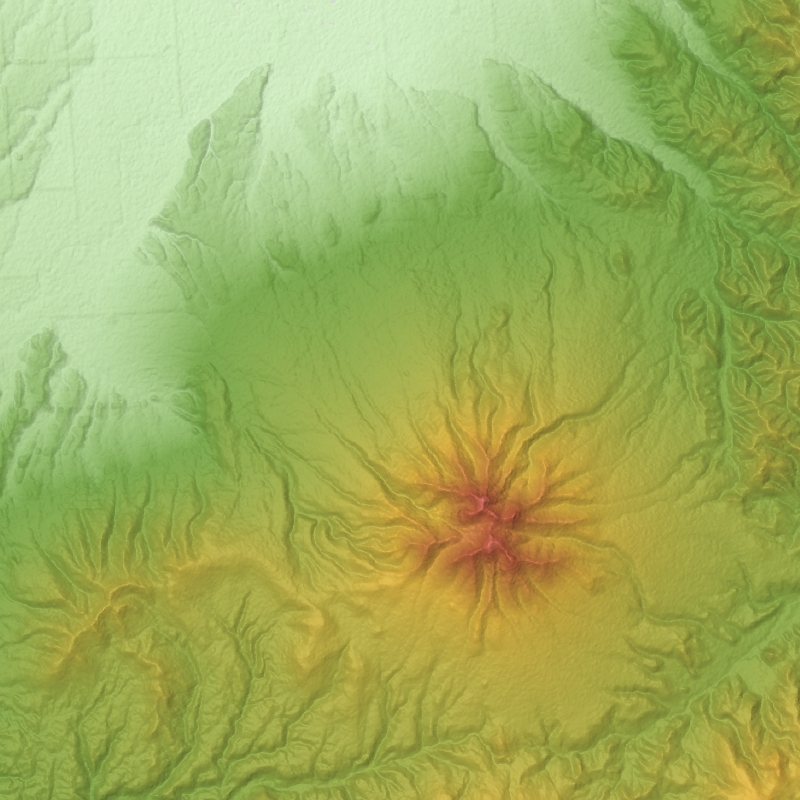
Relief Map

== Geology ==
The mountain is made mainly of andesite, dacite, and basalt.

== Climbing routes ==
The most popular ascent route starts from the Kiyosato side. A public bus (Sharibus) runs three times a day (first at 6:30) from Shiretokoshari Station to the start of the trail.

== See also ==
- List of mountains in Japan
- List of volcanoes in Japan
