= Genseikaen Station =

Railway station in Koshimizu, Hokkaido, Japan

B75 Genseikaen Station 原生花園駅
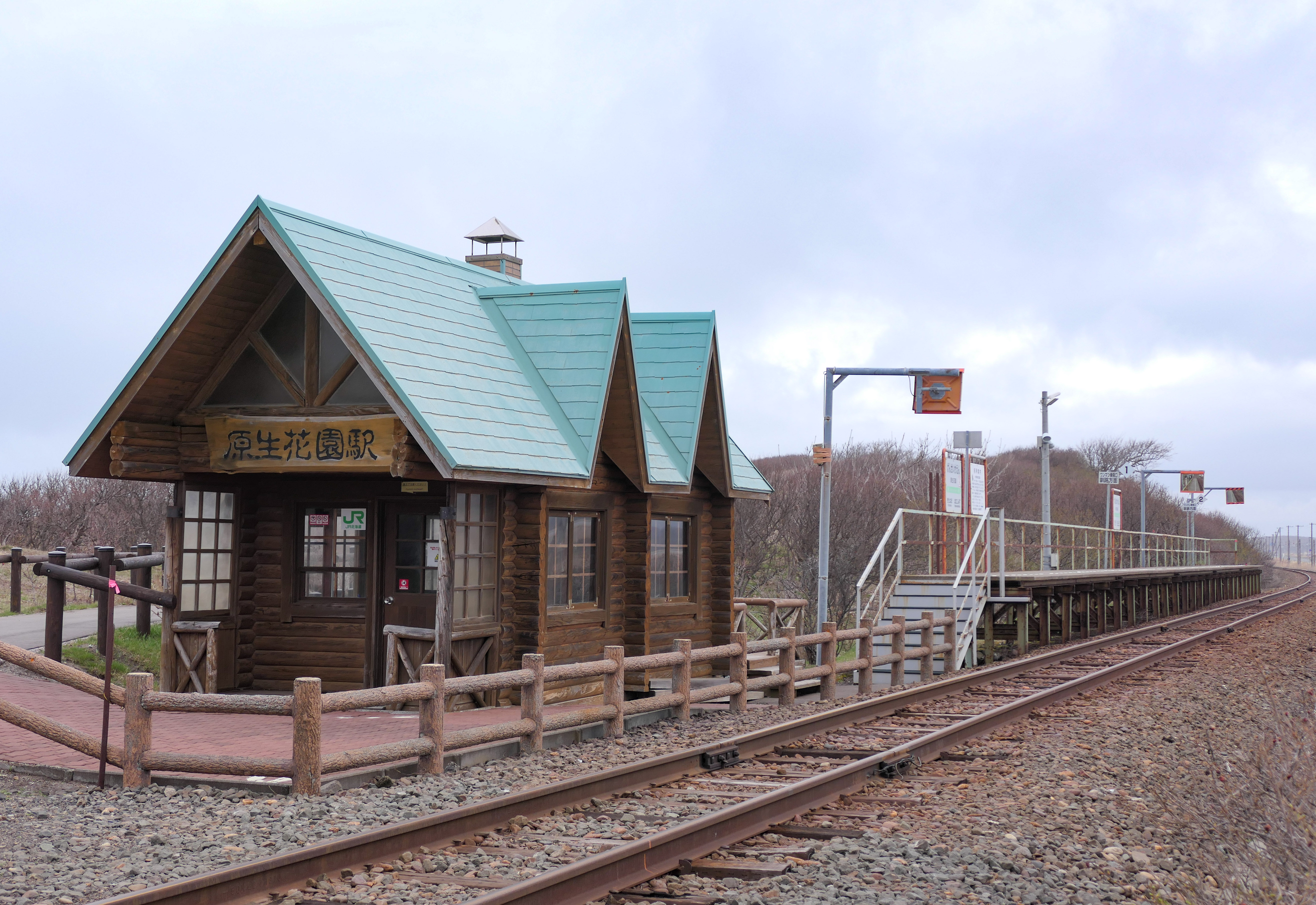
- Genseikaen Station platform

General information
- Location: Hamakoshimizu 2-4, Koshimizu Town, Shari District; Hokkaido Prefecture; Japan
- Coordinates: 43.9408°N 144.4142°E
- Operator: JR Hokkaido
- Line: Senmō Main Line
- Platforms: 1 side platform
- Tracks: 1

Construction
- Structure type: At grade

Other information
- Station code: B-75

History
- Opened: 1 July 1987; 39 years ago

Services
Preceding station	JR Hokkaido	Following station
Kitahama B76 towards Abashiri	Senmō Main Line Rapid Shiretoko Local (Open between May and October)	Hama-Koshimizu B74 towards Kushiro
Location
- Location within Hokkaido Location within Japan

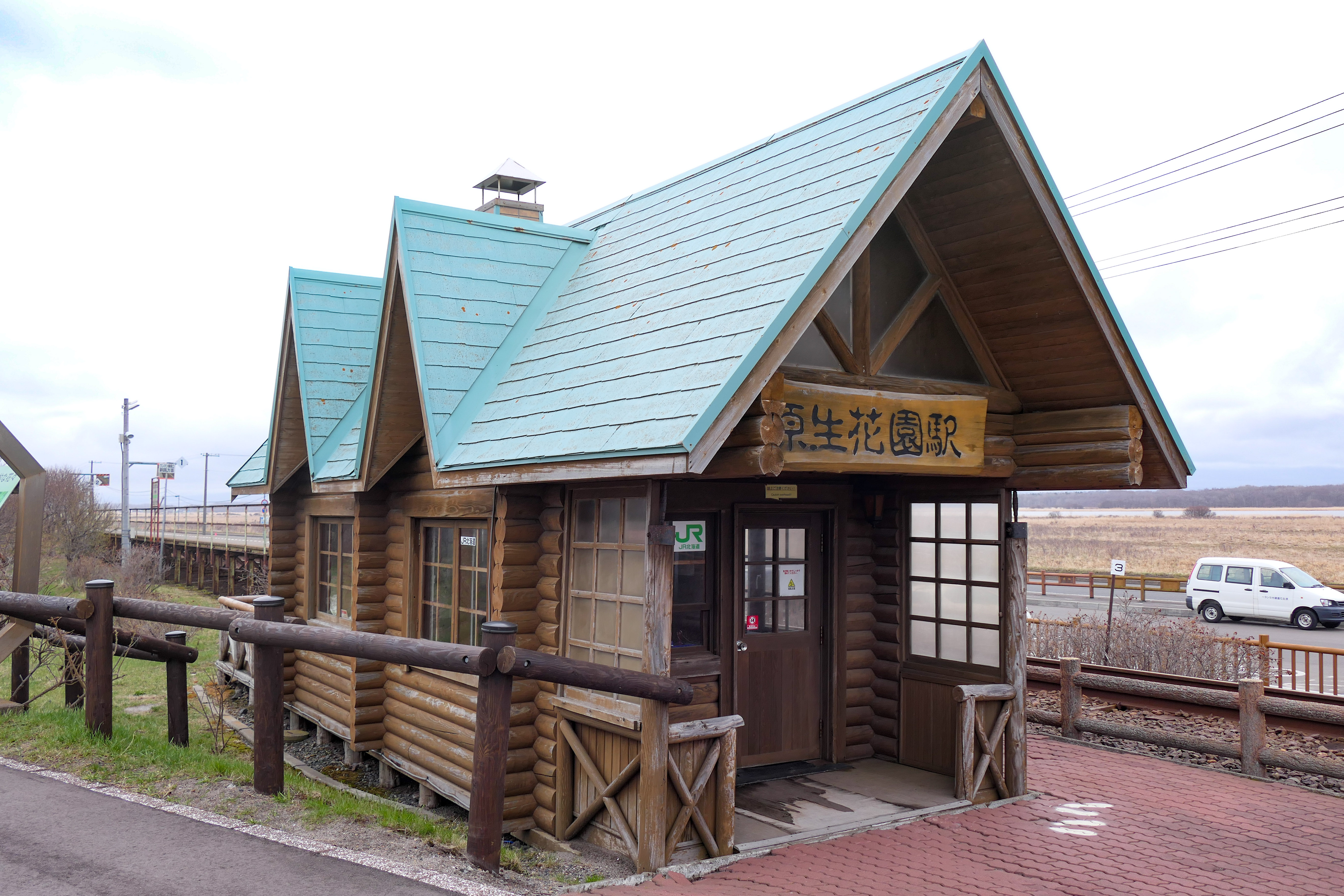
Station building

Genseikaen Station (原生花園駅, Genseikaen-eki) is a railway station on the Senmō Main Line in Koshimizu, Hokkaido, Japan, operated by the Hokkaido Railway Company (JR Hokkaido).

== Lines ==
Genseikaen Station is served by the Senmō Main Line, and is numbered B75.
