= Yamubetsu Station =

Railway station in Koshimizu, Hokkaido, Japan

Coordinates: 43.9214°N 144.5199°E

Yamubetsu Station 止別駅
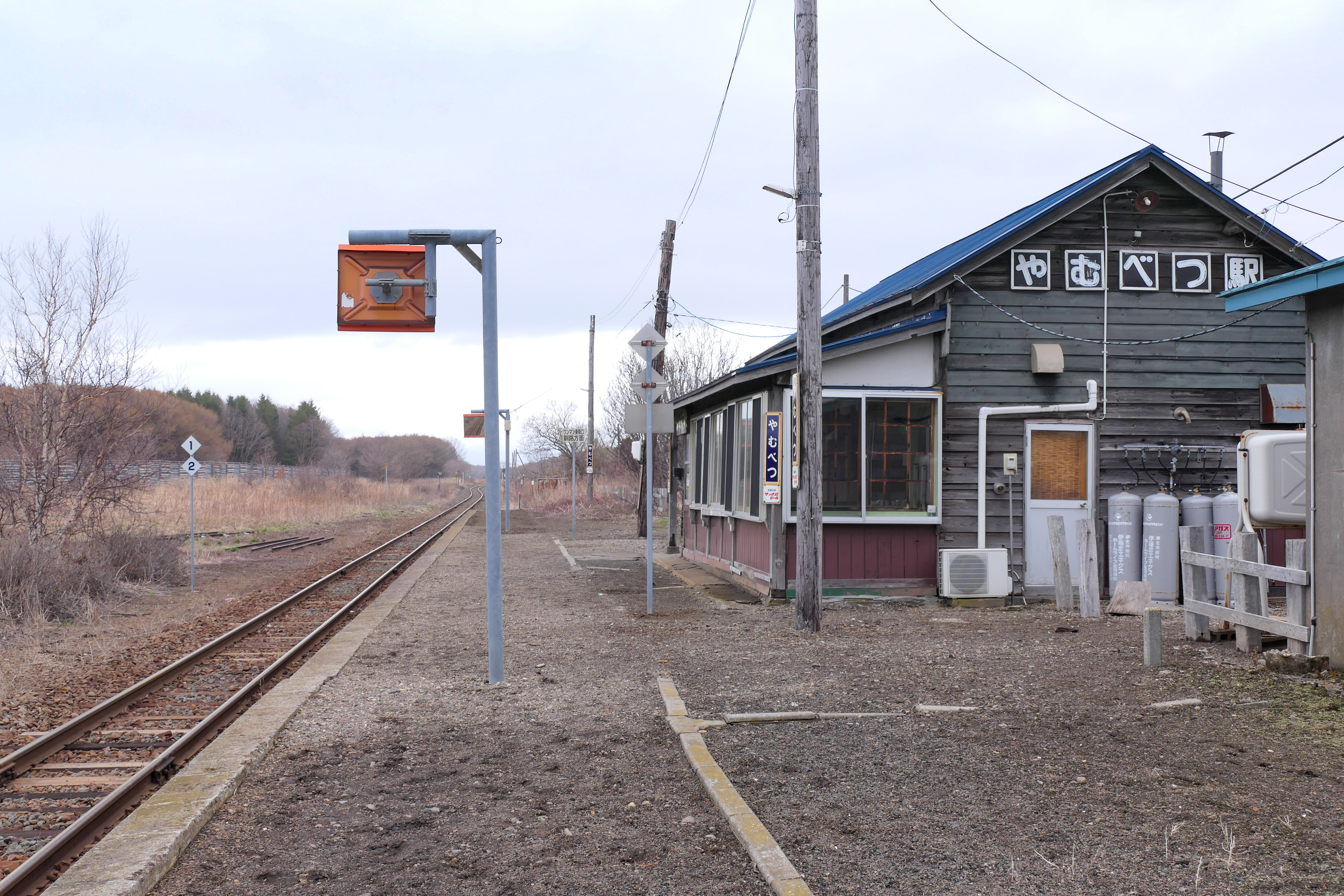
- Yamubetsu Station platform

General information
- Location: Janbetsu, Koshimizu, Shari District, Hokkaido; Japan
- Operator: Hokkaido Railway Company
- Line: Senmō Main Line
- Platforms: Side platform

Other information
- Station code: B-73

History
- Opened: 1925; 101 years ago
Location

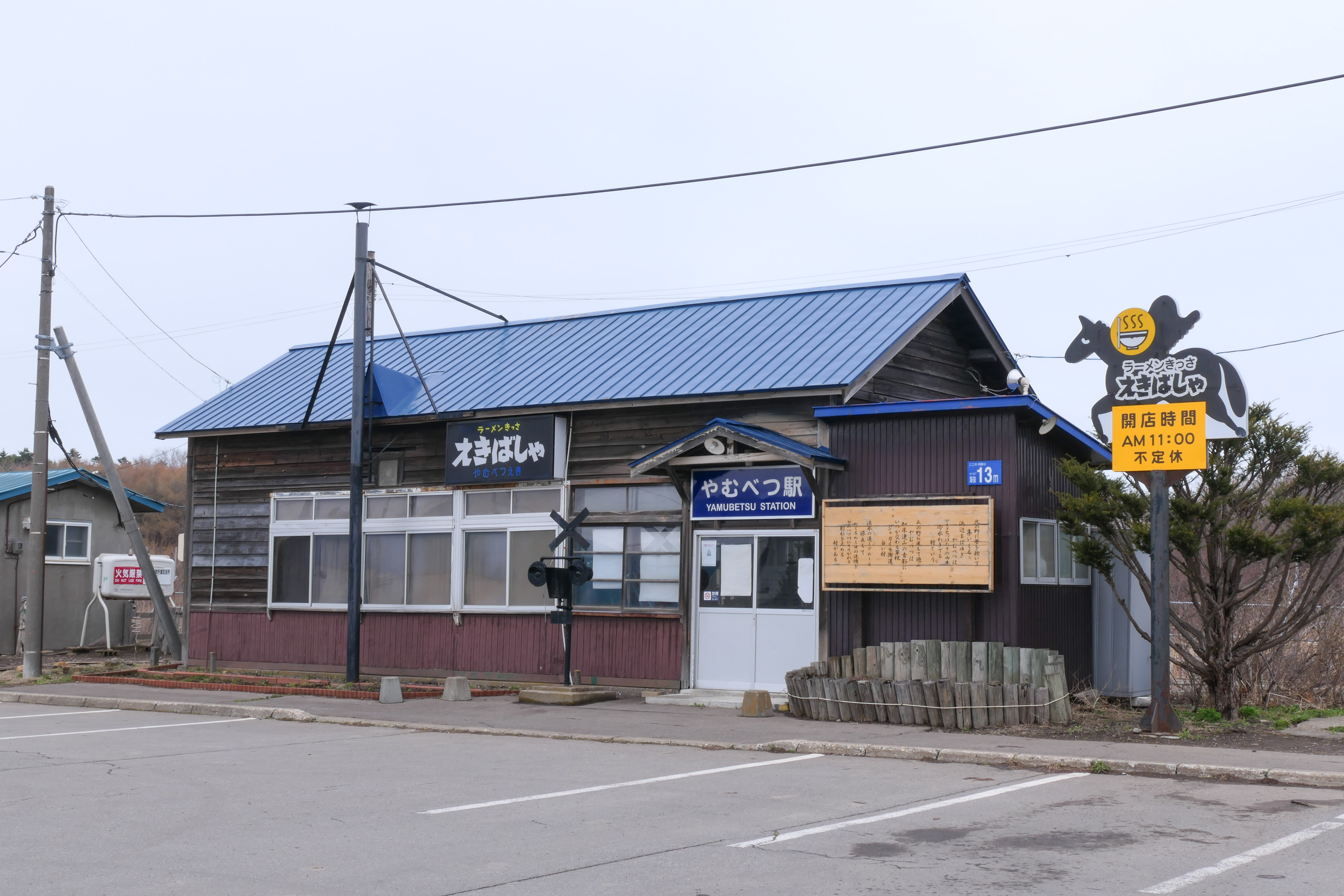
Station building occupied by a restaurant

Yamubetsu Station (止別駅, Yamubetsu-eki) is a railway station on the Senmō Main Line in Koshimizu, Hokkaido, Japan, operated by the Hokkaido Railway Company (JR Hokkaido).

== Lines ==
Yamubetsu Station is served by the Senmō Main Line, and is numbered B73.

== Adjacent stations ==
«	Service	»
Senmō Main Line
Hama-Koshimizu	Rapid Shiretoko	Shiretoko-Shari
Hama-Koshimizu	Local	Shiretoko-Shari
