= Naka-Shari Station =

Railway station in Shari, Hokkaido, Japan

Coordinates: 43.8747°N 144.6591°E

Naka-Shari Station 中斜里駅
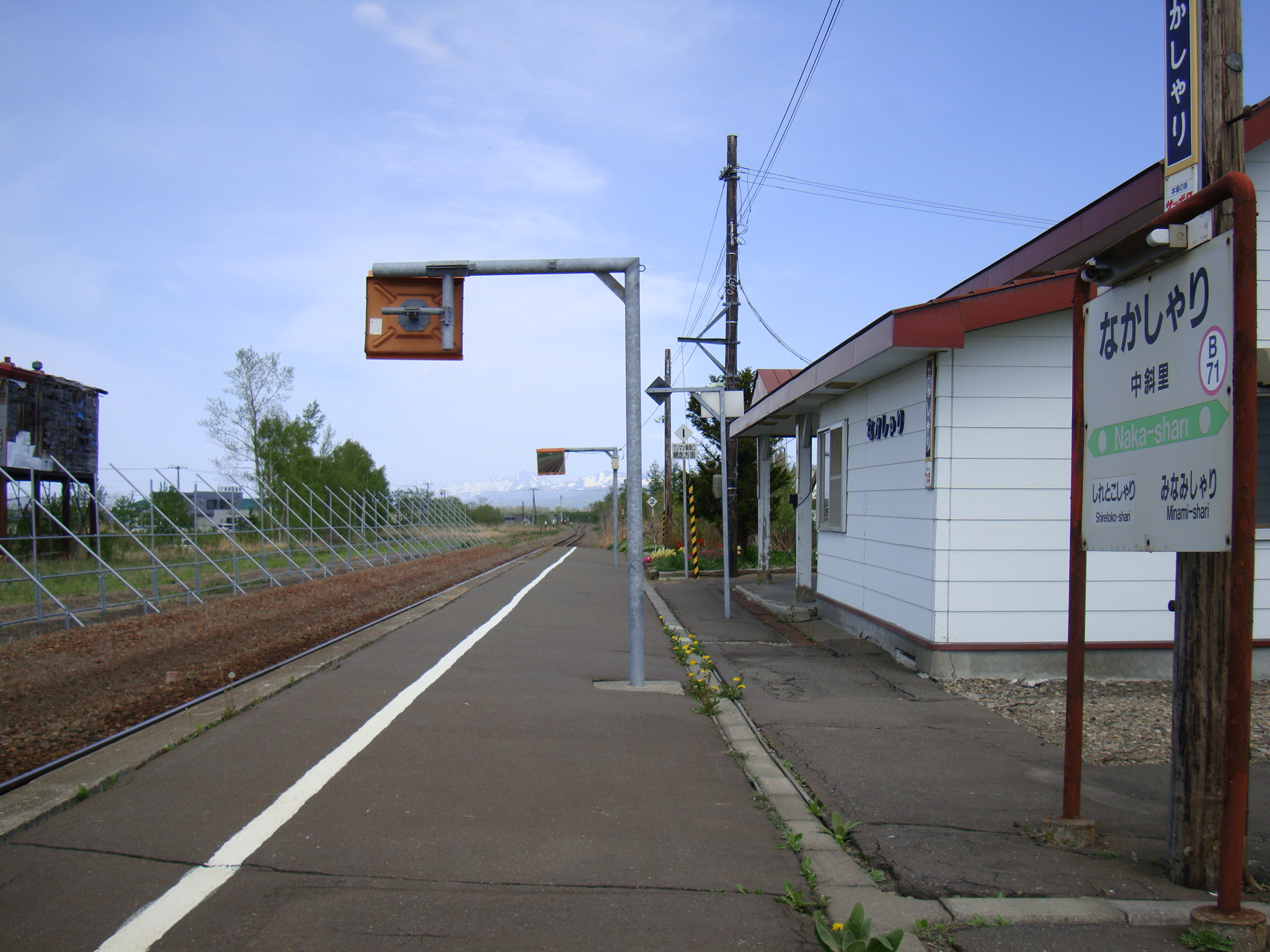
- Naka-Shari Station platform

General information
- Location: 83 Nakashari, Shari, Hokkaido; Japan
- Operator: Hokkaido Railway Company
- Line: Senmō Main Line
- Platforms: Side platform

Other information
- Station code: B-71

History
- Opened: 1929; 97 years ago
Location

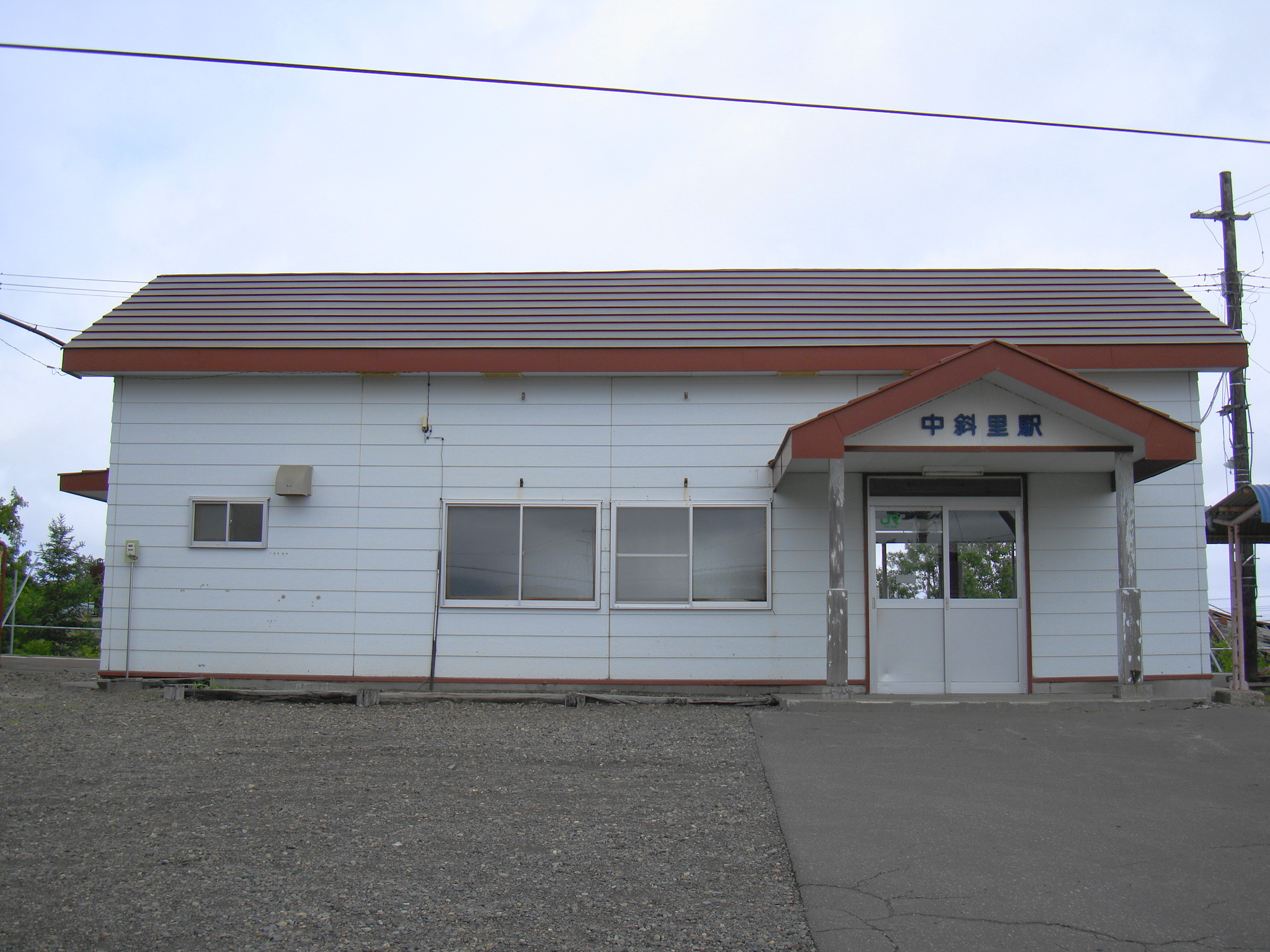
Station building

Naka-Shari Station (中斜里駅, Naka-Shari-eki) is a train station in Shari, Hokkaidō, Japan.

== Lines ==
- Hokkaido Railway Company
  - Senmō Main Line Station B71

== Adjacent stations ==
«	Service	»
Senmō Main Line
Shiretoko-Shari	Rapid Shiretoko	Kiyosatochō
Shiretoko-Shari	Local	Kiyosatochō
