= Hama-Koshimizu Station =

Railway station in Koshimizu, Hokkaido, Japan

B74 Hamakoshimizu Station 浜小清水駅
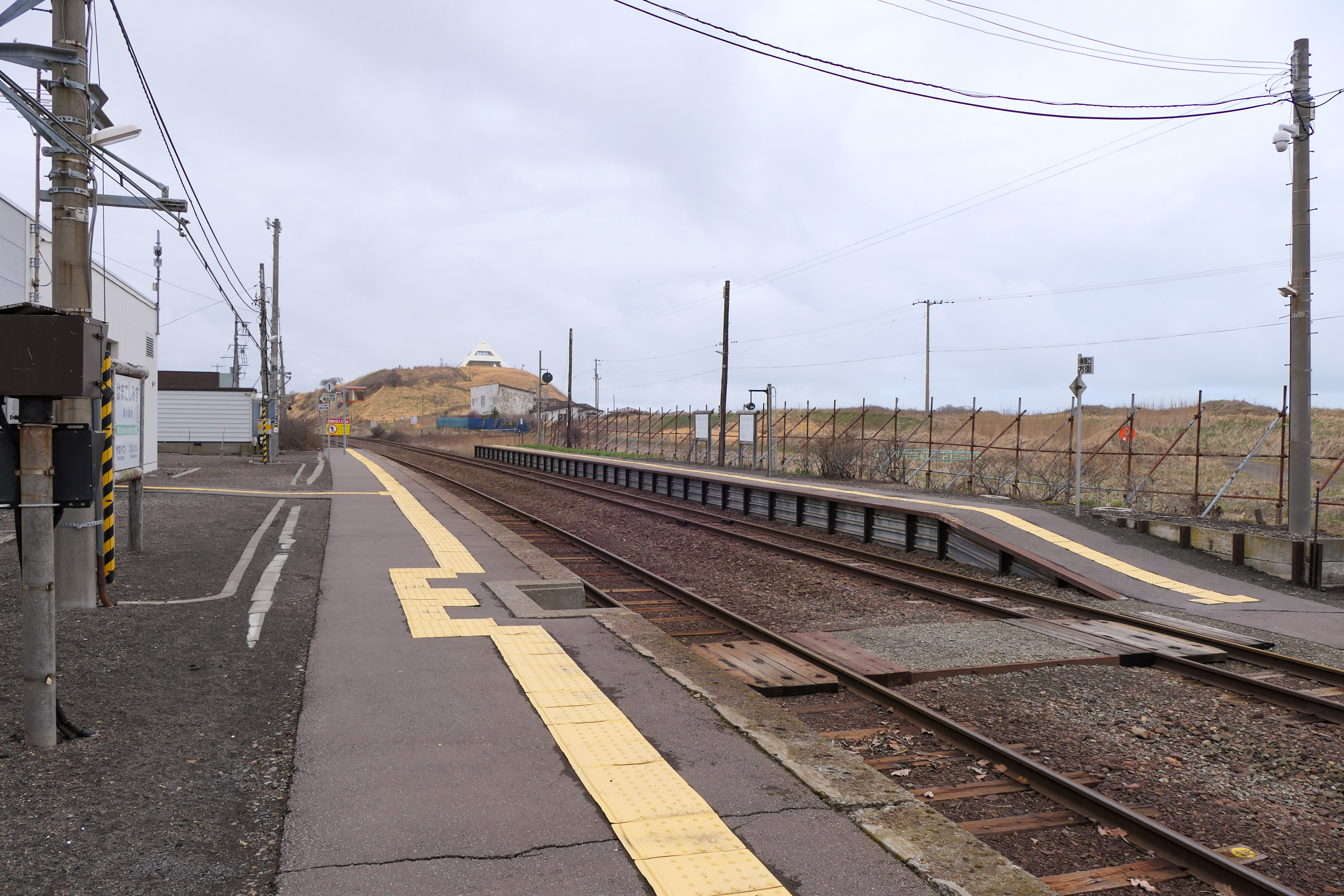
- Platforms and tracks

General information
- Location: 474-7 Koshimizu, Koshimizu Town, Shari District; Hokkaido Prefecture; Japan
- Coordinates: 43°56′2.36″N 144°27′11.48″E
- Operator: JR Hokkaido
- Line: Senmō Main Line
- Platforms: 2 side platforms
- Tracks: 2
- Connections: Bus stop

Construction
- Structure type: At grade

Other information
- Station code: B74

History
- Opened: 10 November 1925; 100 years ago
- Former names: Furutoi (until 1952)

Passengers
- 2014: 62 daily

Services
Preceding station	JR Hokkaido	Following station
Kitahama B76 (November to April) towards Abashiri	Senmō Main Line Rapid Shiretoko Local	Yamubetsu B73 towards Kushiro
Genseikaen B75 (May to October) towards Abashiri	Senmō Main Line	Yamubetsu B73 towards Kushiro
Location
- Location within Hokkaido Location within Japan

Hama-Koshimizu Station (浜小清水駅, Hamakoshimizu-eki) is a railway station on the Senmō Main Line in Koshimizu, Hokkaido, Japan, operated by the Hokkaido Railway Company (JR Hokkaido).

== Lines ==
Hama-Koshimizu Station is served by the Senmō Main Line between Higashi-Kushiro and Abashiri. It is numbered B74.

== Layout ==
The station is unstaffed, and consists of two side platforms serving two tracks.

== History ==
The station opened on 10 November 1925 as Furutoi Station (古樋駅). It was renamed Hama-Koshimizu on 15 November 1952 due to its proximity to the beach at the town of Koshimizu.

== Surroundings ==
- Route 244
- Abashiri Bus "Hama-Koshimizu Eki-mae" Bus Stop
