= Midori Station (Hokkaido) =

Railway station in Kiyosato, Hokkaido, Japan

Coordinates: 43°43′06″N 144°30′20″E

Midori Station 緑駅
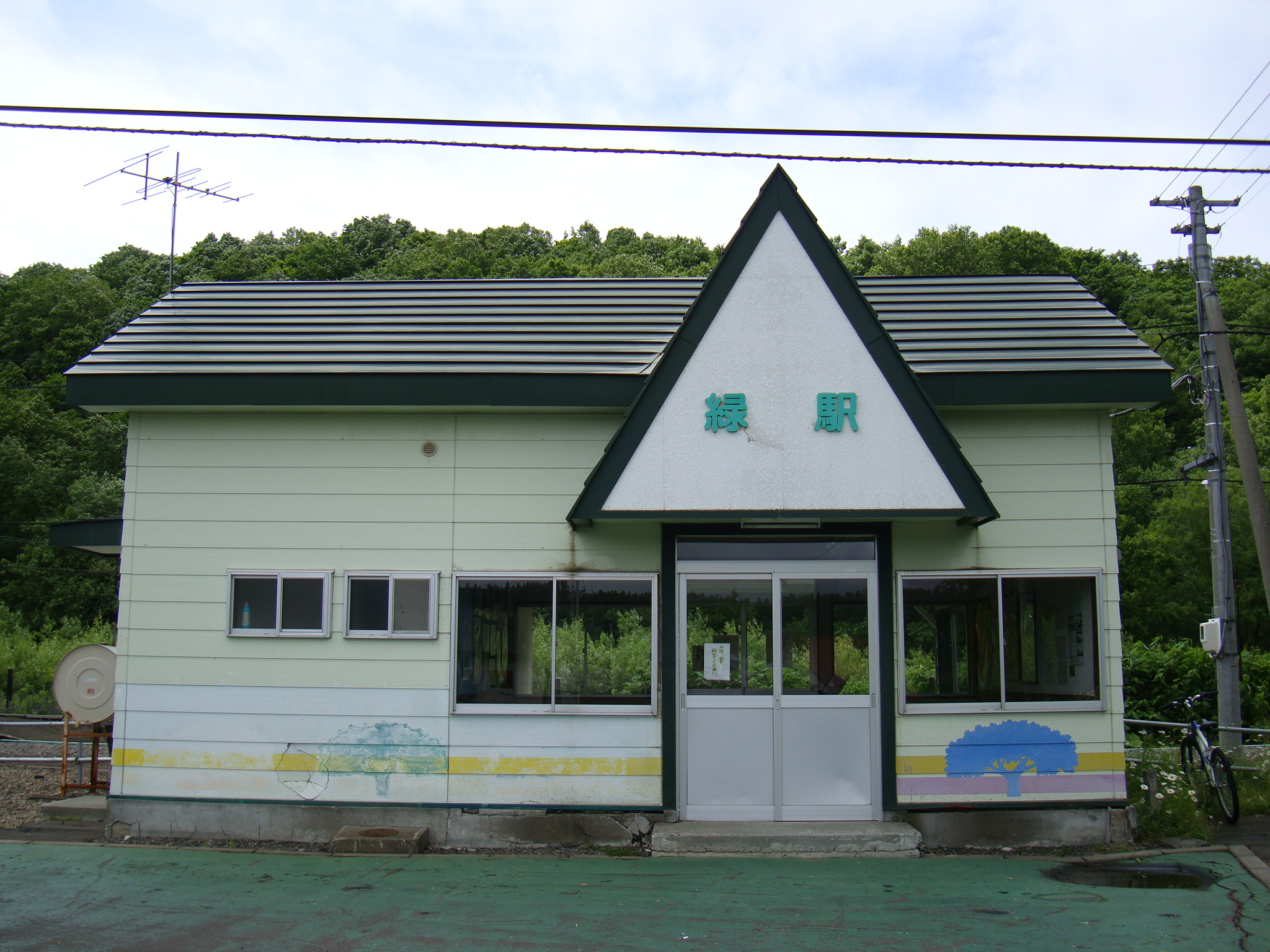
- Station building, July 2009

General information
- Location: 34-13 Midori-machi, Kiyosato, Shari, Hokkaido （斜里郡清里町緑町３４番地の１３） Japan
- Operator: JR Hokkaido
- Line: Senmō Main Line

Other information
- Station code: B67

History
- Opened: 1931; 95 years ago
- Former names: Kami-Sattsuru (until 1956)
Location

Midori Station (緑駅, Midori-eki) is a railway station on the Senmō Main Line in Kiyosato, Hokkaido, Japan, operated by the Hokkaido Railway Company (JR Hokkaido). It is numbered B67.

== Lines ==
Midori Station is served by the Senmō Main Line from Abashiri to Higashi-Kushiro.

== Adjacent stations ==
«	Service	»
Senmō Main Line
Sattsuru	Rapid Shiretoko	Kawayu-Onsen
Sattsuru	Local	Kawayu-Onsen

== History ==
The station opened on 20 September 1931, originally as Kami-Sattsuru Station (上札鶴駅). It was renamed Midori Station on 10 April 1956.

In June 2023, this station was selected to be among 42 stations on the JR Hokkaido network to be slated for abolition owing to low ridership.

== Surrounding area ==
- Midori Post office
