= Midori Station =

Midori Station is the name of two train stations in Japan:

- Midori Station (Gifu) (水鳥駅)
- Midori Station (Hokkaidō) (緑駅)
