= Mokoto Station =

Railway station in Abashiri, Hokkaido, Japan

Coordinates: 43.9679°N 144.3209°E

B77 Mokoto Station 藻琴駅
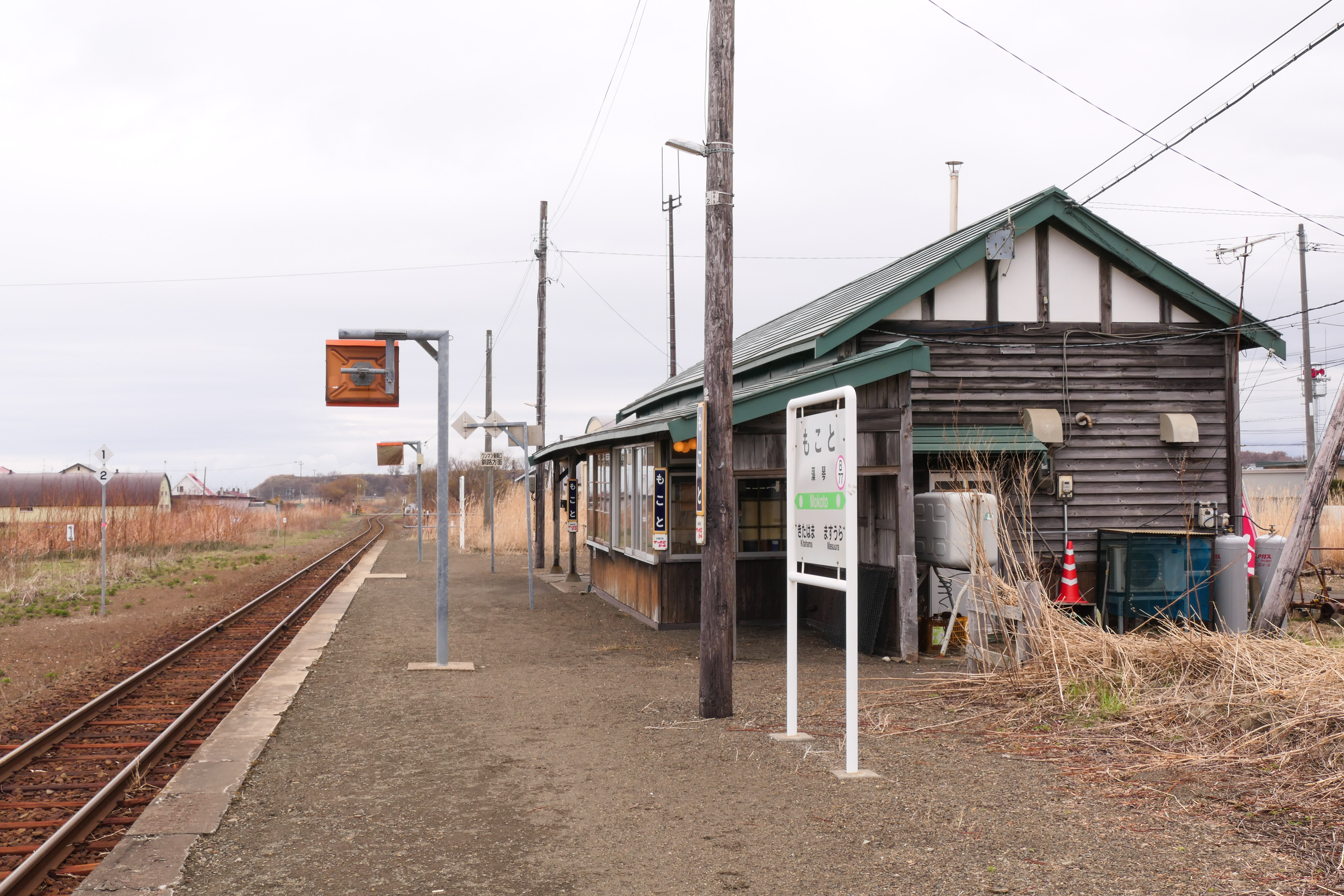
- Mokoto Station platform

General information
- Location: Mokoto, Abashiri City; Hokkaido; Japan
- Operator: JR Hokkaido
- Line: Senmō Main Line
- Platforms: 1 side platform
- Tracks: 1

Construction
- Structure type: At grade

Other information
- Station code: B-77

History
- Opened: 15 November 1924; 101 years ago

Passengers
- 2014: 30 daily

Services
Preceding station	JR Hokkaido	Following station
Abashiri A69 Terminus	Senmō Main Line Rapid Shiretoko Local	Kitahama B76 towards Kushiro
Masuura B78 towards Abashiri	Senmō Main Line	Kitahama B76 towards Kushiro
Location
- Location within Hokkaido Location within Japan

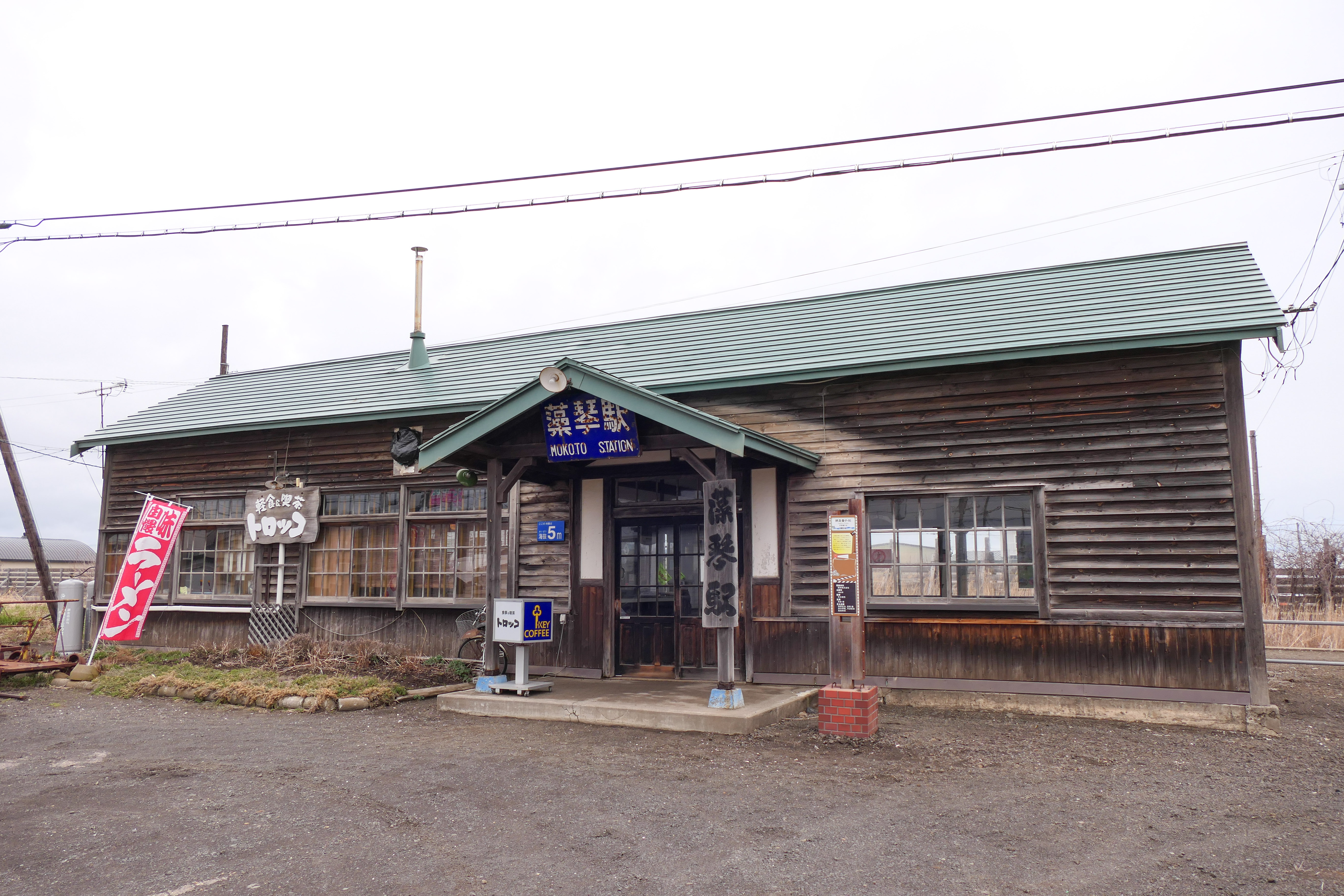
Station building occupied by a café

Mokoto Station (藻琴駅, Mokoto-eki) is a train station in Abashiri, Hokkaidō, Japan.

== Lines ==
- Hokkaido Railway Company
  - Senmō Main Line Station B77
