= Masuura Station =

Railway station in Abashiri, Hokkaido, Japan

Coordinates: 43.9839°N 144.2967°E

Masuura Station 鱒浦駅
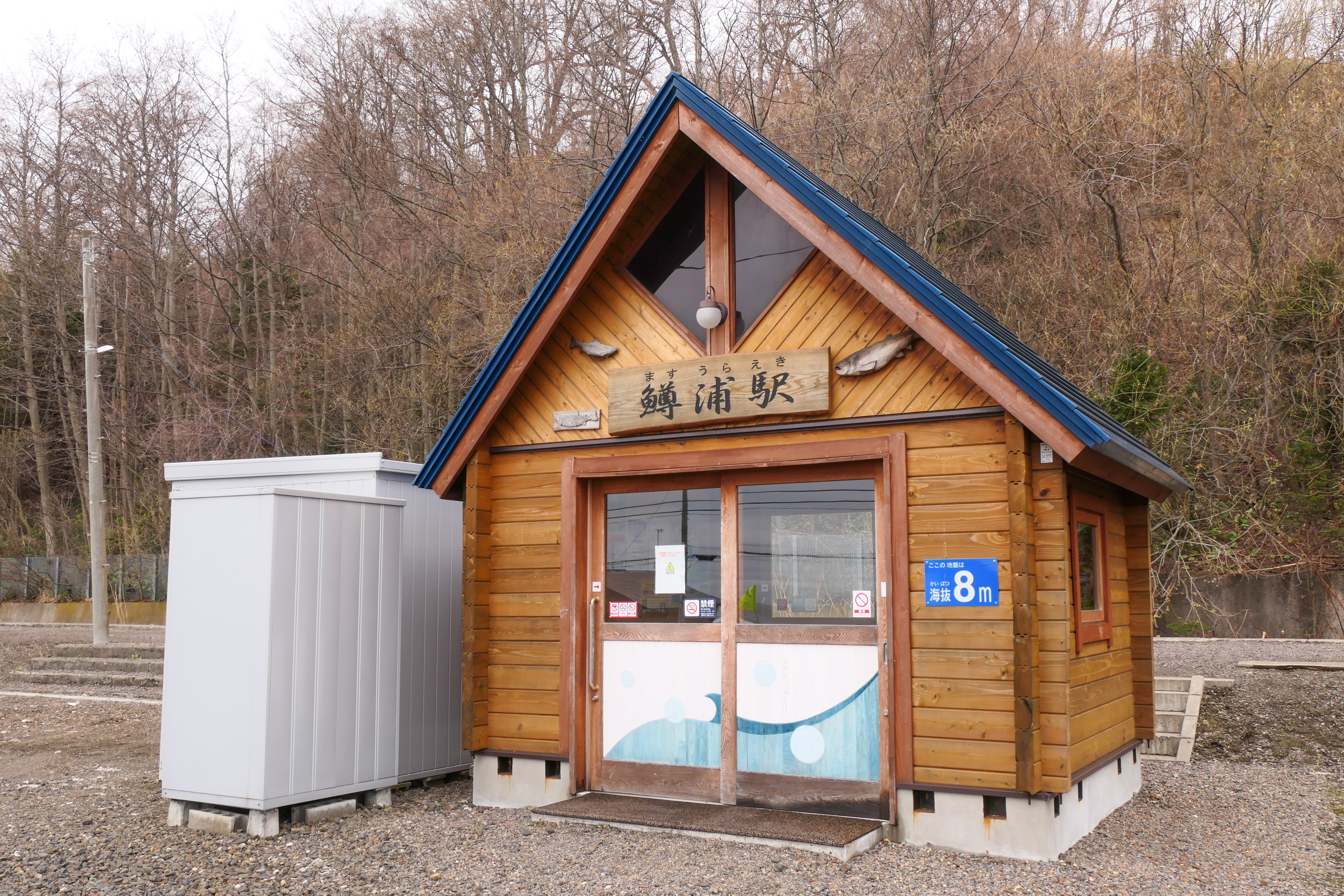
- The new station structure in May 2021

General information
- Location: 104-1 Masuura, Abashiri, Hokkaido （網走市鱒浦１０４-１） Japan
- Operator: JR Hokkaido
- Line: Senmō Main Line

Other information
- Station code: B78

History
- Opened: 1924
Location

Masuura Station (鱒浦駅, Masuura-eki) is a railway station on the Senmō Main Line in Abashiri, Hokkaido, Japan, operated by Hokkaido Railway Company (JR Hokkaido). It is numbered "B78".

== Lines ==
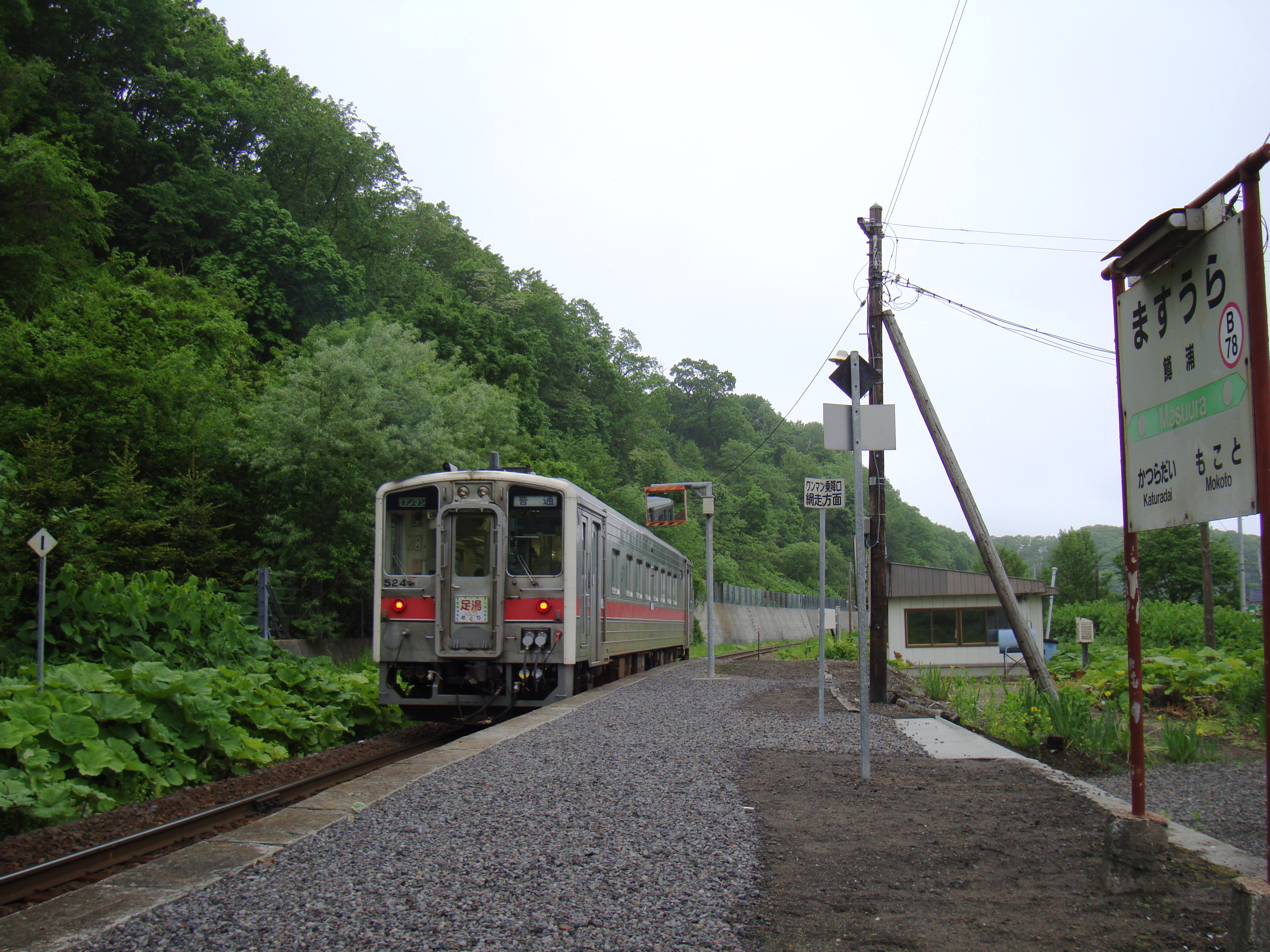
A train arriving at Masuura Station in June 2010

Masuura Station is served by the Senmō Main Line from Abashiri to Higashi-Kushiro, and is 6.2 km from the starting point of the line at Abashiri.

== Adjacent stations ==
«	Service	»
Senmō Main Line
Rapid Shiretoko: Does not stop at this station
Katsuradai	Local	Mokoto

== History ==
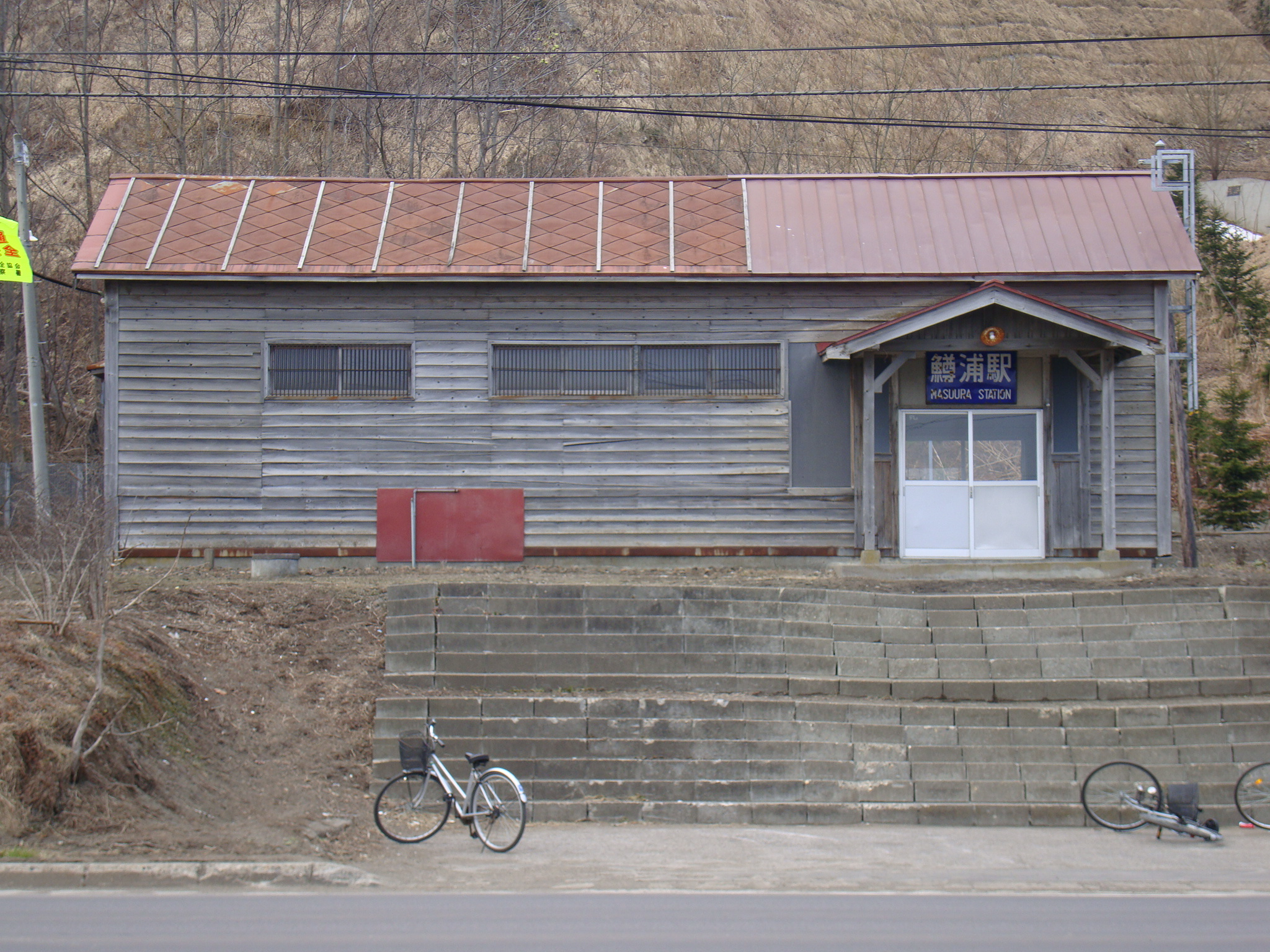
The former station structure in April 2009

The station opened on 15 November 1924.

From late 2014, a new wooden waiting room was built to replace the previous station structure.

== Surrounding area ==
- National Route 244

== See also ==
- List of railway stations in Japan
