= Shiretoko-Shari Station =

Railway station in Shari, Hokkaido, Japan

Coordinates: 43.911°N 144.6616°E

Shiretoko-Shari Station 知床斜里駅
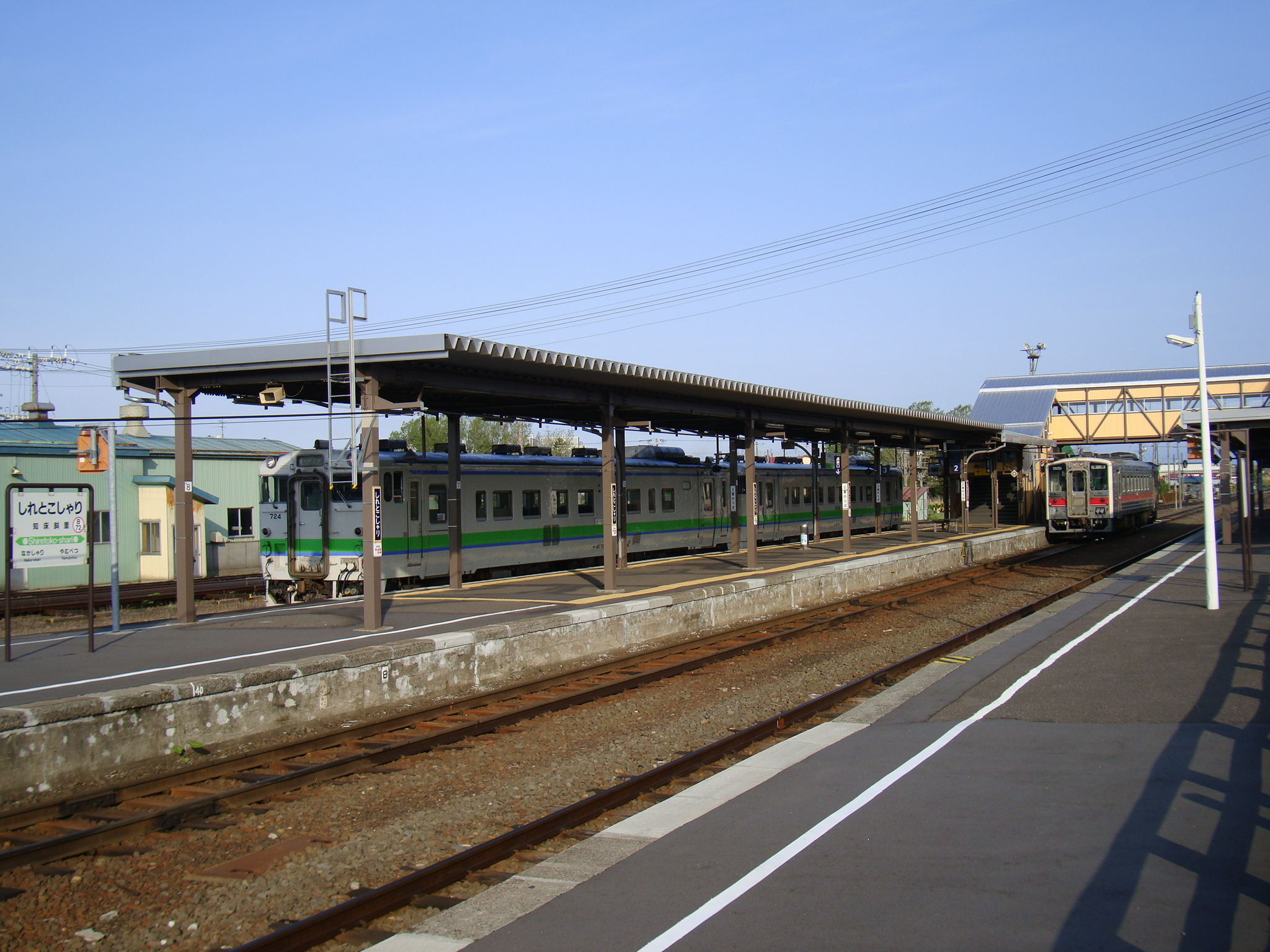
- Shiretoko-Shari Station platform

General information
- Location: 17 Minatomachi, Shari, Hokkaido; Japan
- Operator: Hokkaido Railway Company
- Line: Senmō Main Line
- Platforms: 2 island platform
- Connections: Bus stop

Other information
- Station code: B-72

History
- Opened: 1925; 101 years ago
- Former names: Shari (until 1998)

Passengers
- 2023: 228 (daily)
Location

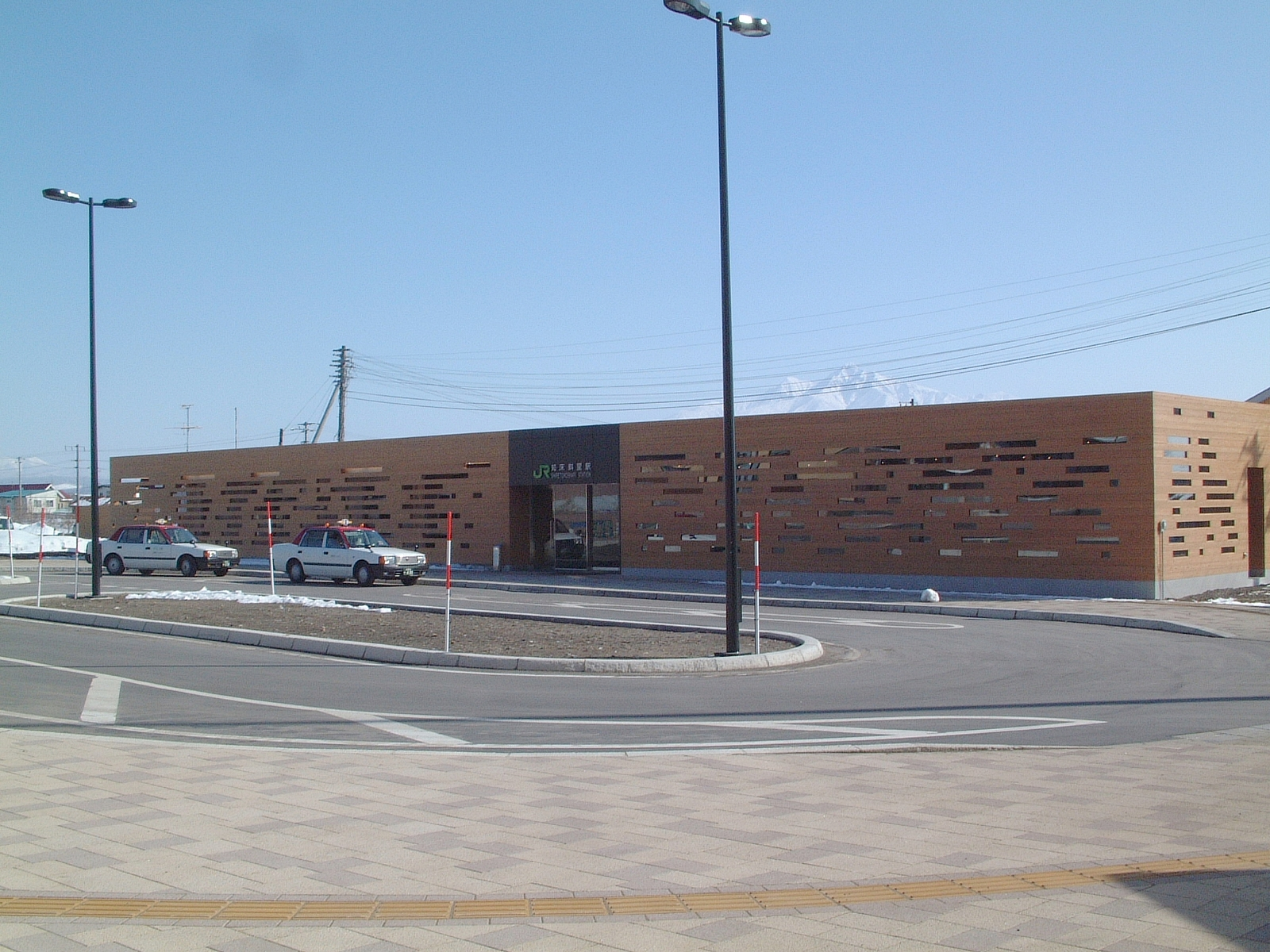
Station building

Shiretoko-Shari Station (知床斜里駅, Shiretoko-Shari-eki) is a train station in Shari, Hokkaidō, Japan.

== Lines ==
- Hokkaido Railway Company
  - Senmō Main Line Station B72

== Adjacent stations ==
«	Service	»
Senmō Main Line
Yamubetsu	Rapid Shiretoko	Naka-Shari
Yamubetsu	Local	Naka-Shari
Kompoku Line (~1970)
Terminus	Local	Ikushina
