= Kitahama Station (Hokkaido) =

Railway station in Abashiri, Hokkaido, Japan

Coordinates: 43.9584°N 144.353°E

B76 Kitahama Station 北浜駅
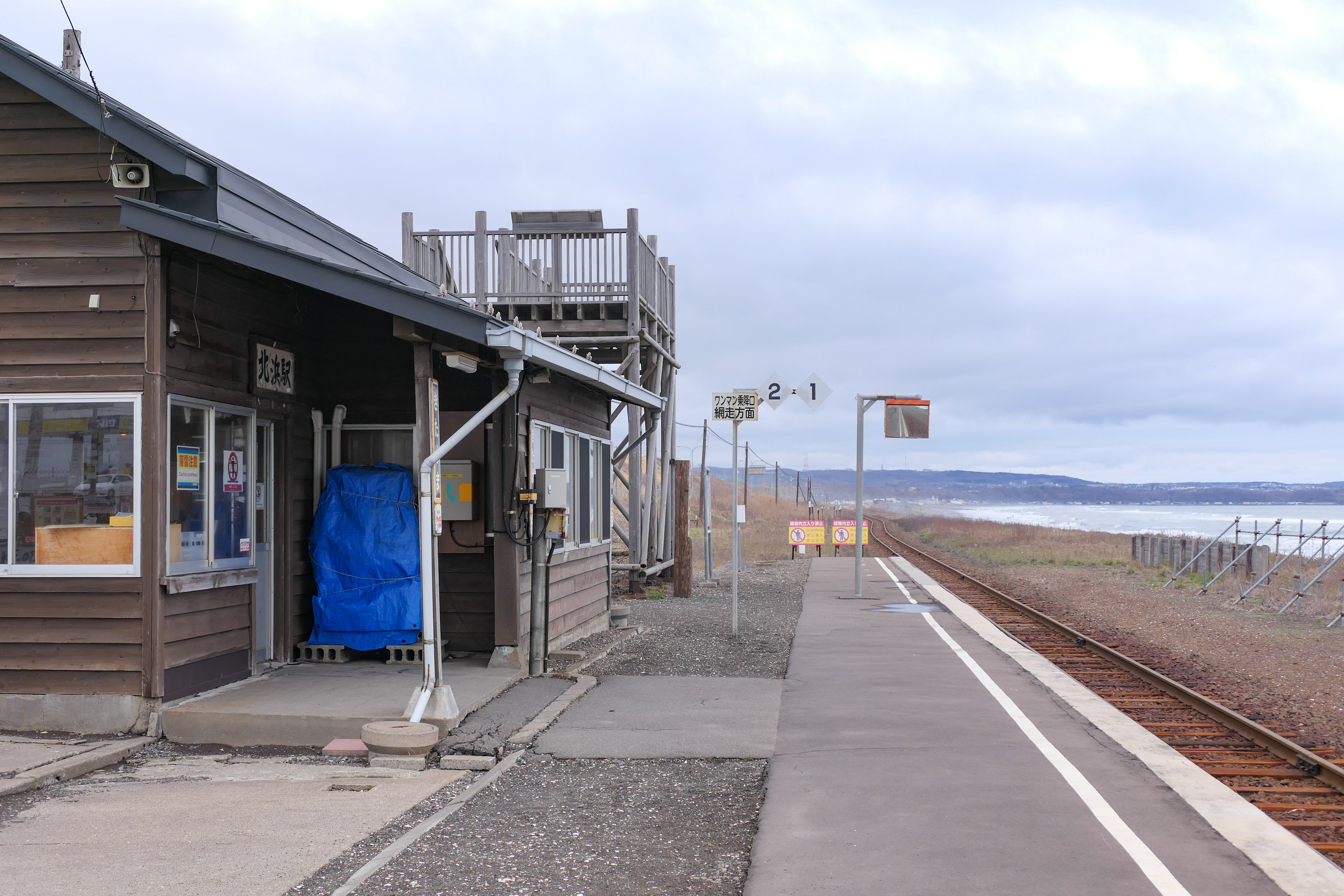
- Station building (left) and the Sea of Okhotsk (right) (2021)

General information
- Location: Kitahama, Abashiri City, Hokkaido Prefecture; Japan
- Operator: JR Hokkaido
- Line: Senmō Main Line
- Platforms: 1 side platform
- Tracks: 1

Construction
- Structure type: At grade

Other information
- Station code: B-76

History
- Opened: 15 November 1924; 101 years ago

Passengers
- 2014: 26 daily

Services
Preceding station	JR Hokkaido	Following station
Mokoto B77 towards Abashiri	Senmō Main Line Rapid Shiretoko Local	Hama-Koshimizu B74 (November to April) towards Kushiro
Mokoto B77 towards Abashiri	Senmō Main Line Rapid Shiretoko Local	Genseikaen B75 (May to October) towards Kushiro
Location
- Location within Hokkaido Location within Japan

Kitahama Station (北浜駅, Kitahama-eki) is a train station in Abashiri, Hokkaido, Japan.

== Lines ==
- Hokkaido Railway Company
  - Senmō Main Line Station B76

== Gallery ==
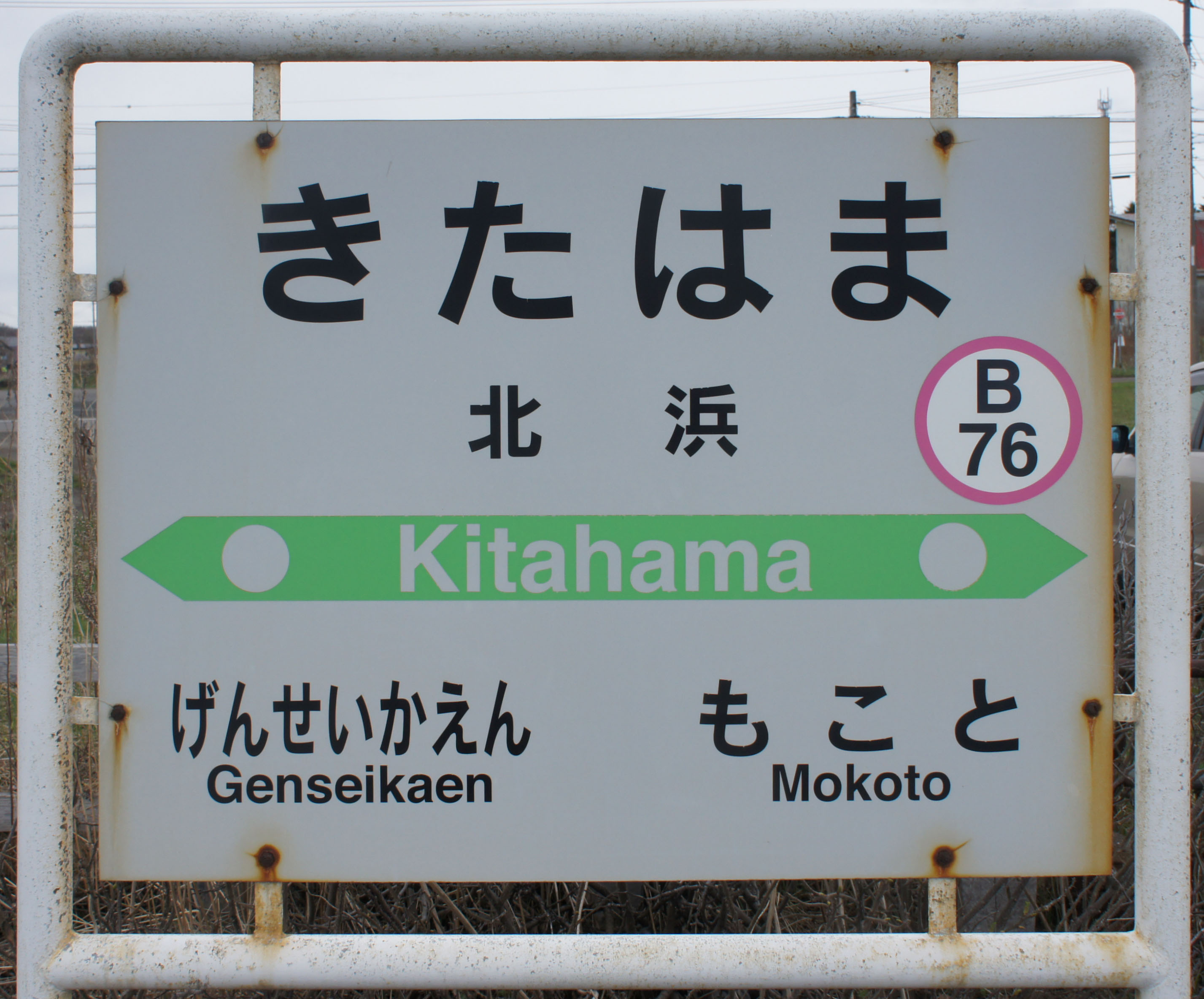
Platform signboard, May 2018

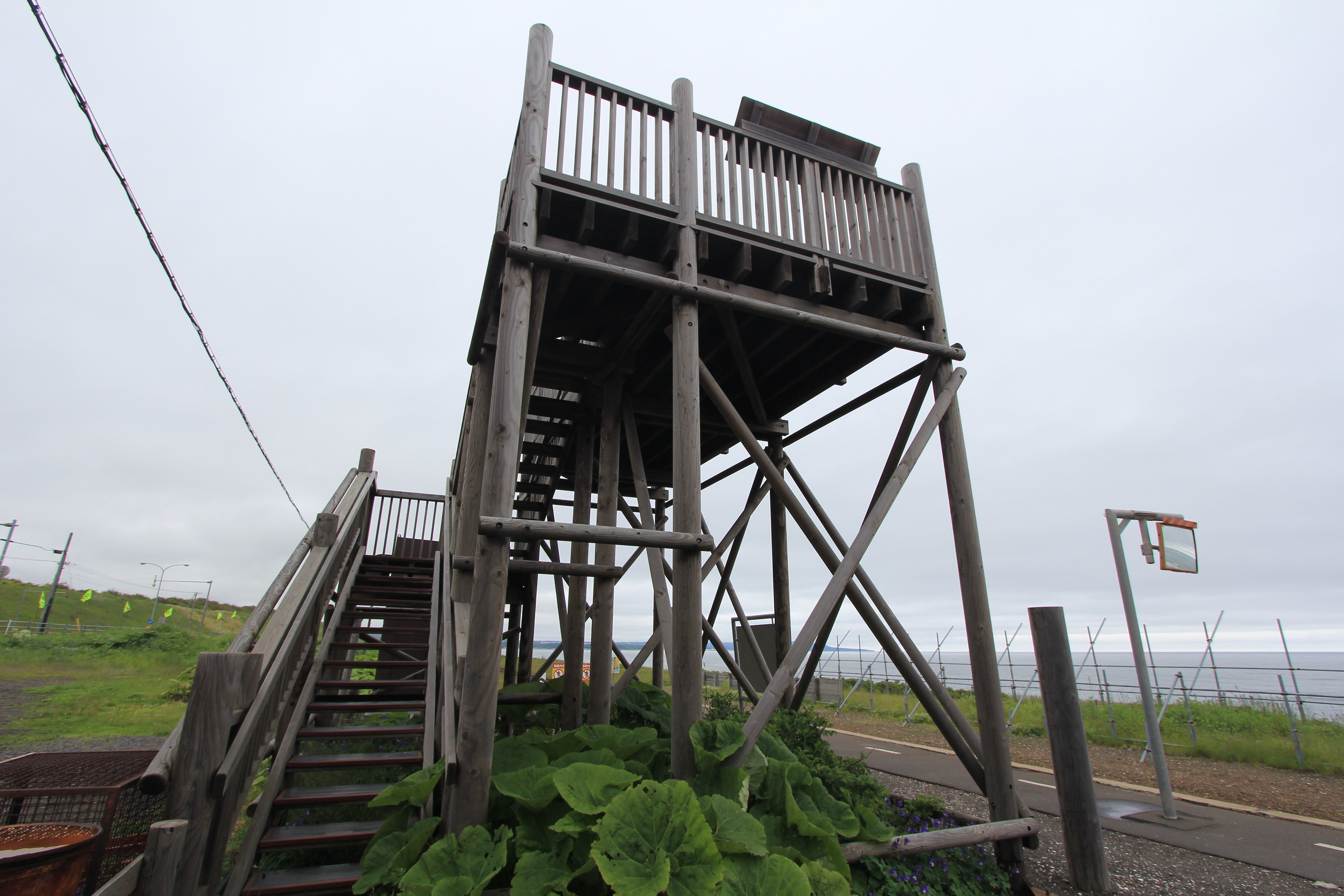
Observation Tower, June 2012

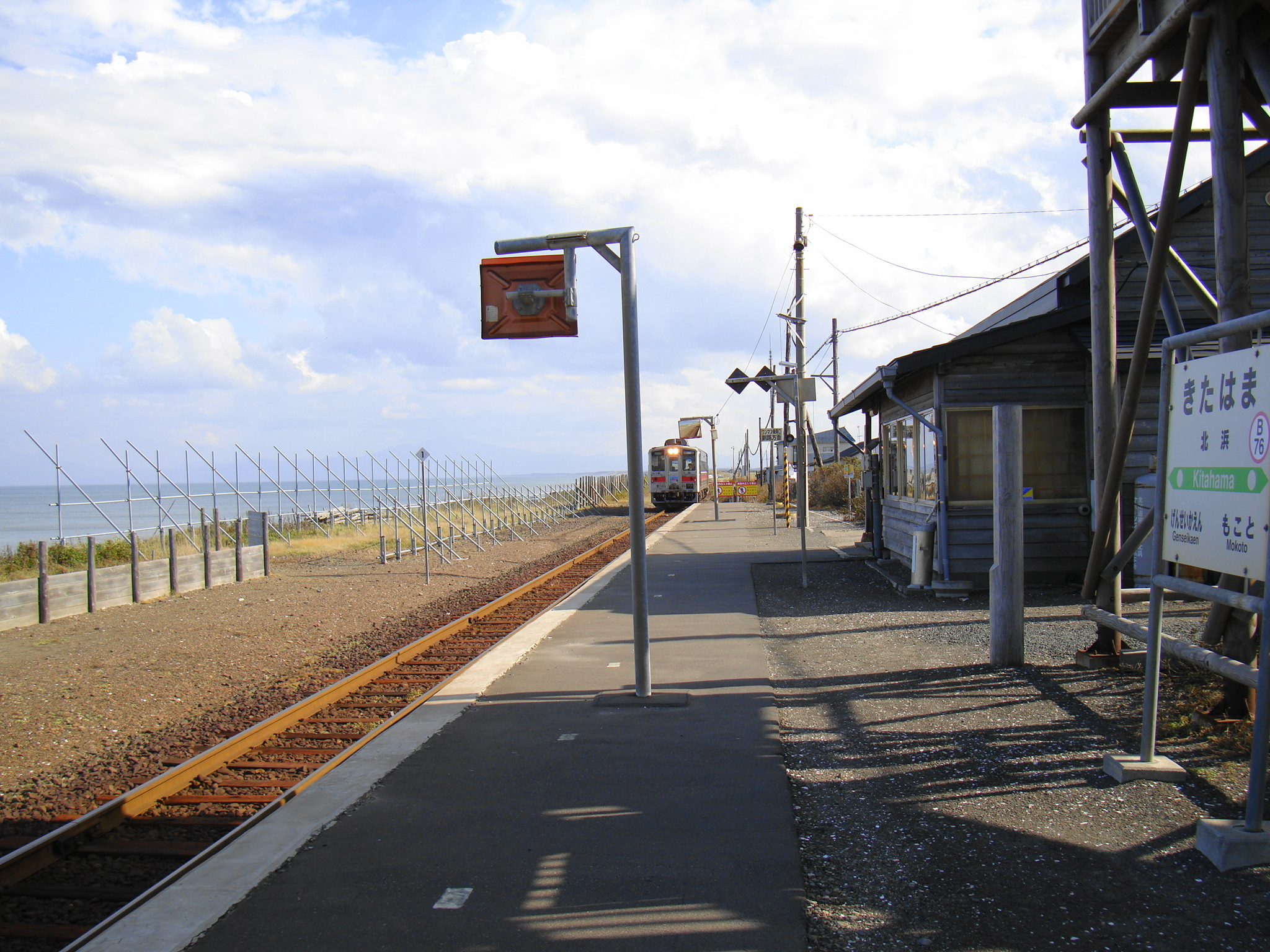
Kitahama Station platform, April 2009

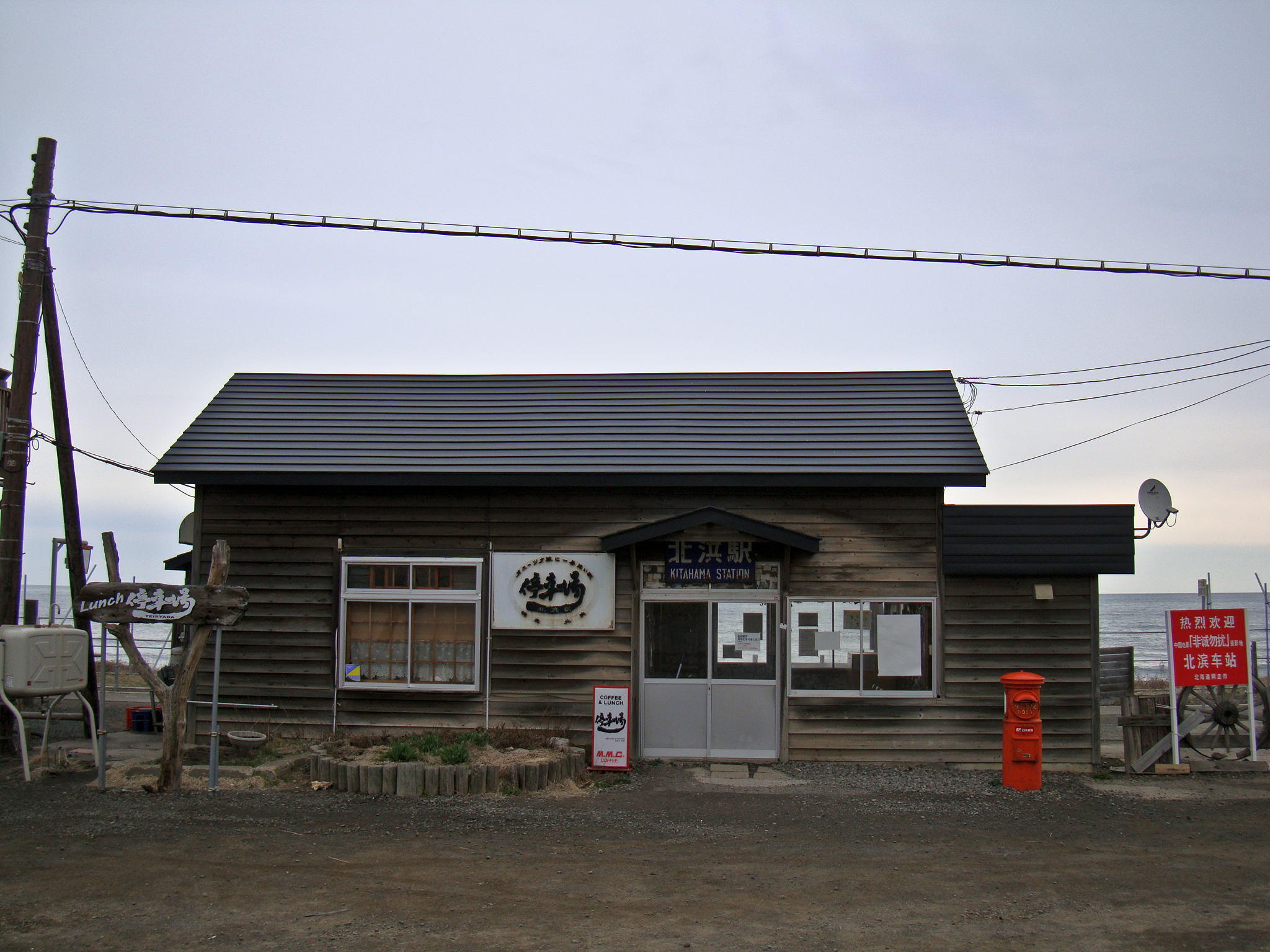
Station building occupied by a café
