= Koshimizu, Hokkaido =

Koshimizu 小清水町
- Town
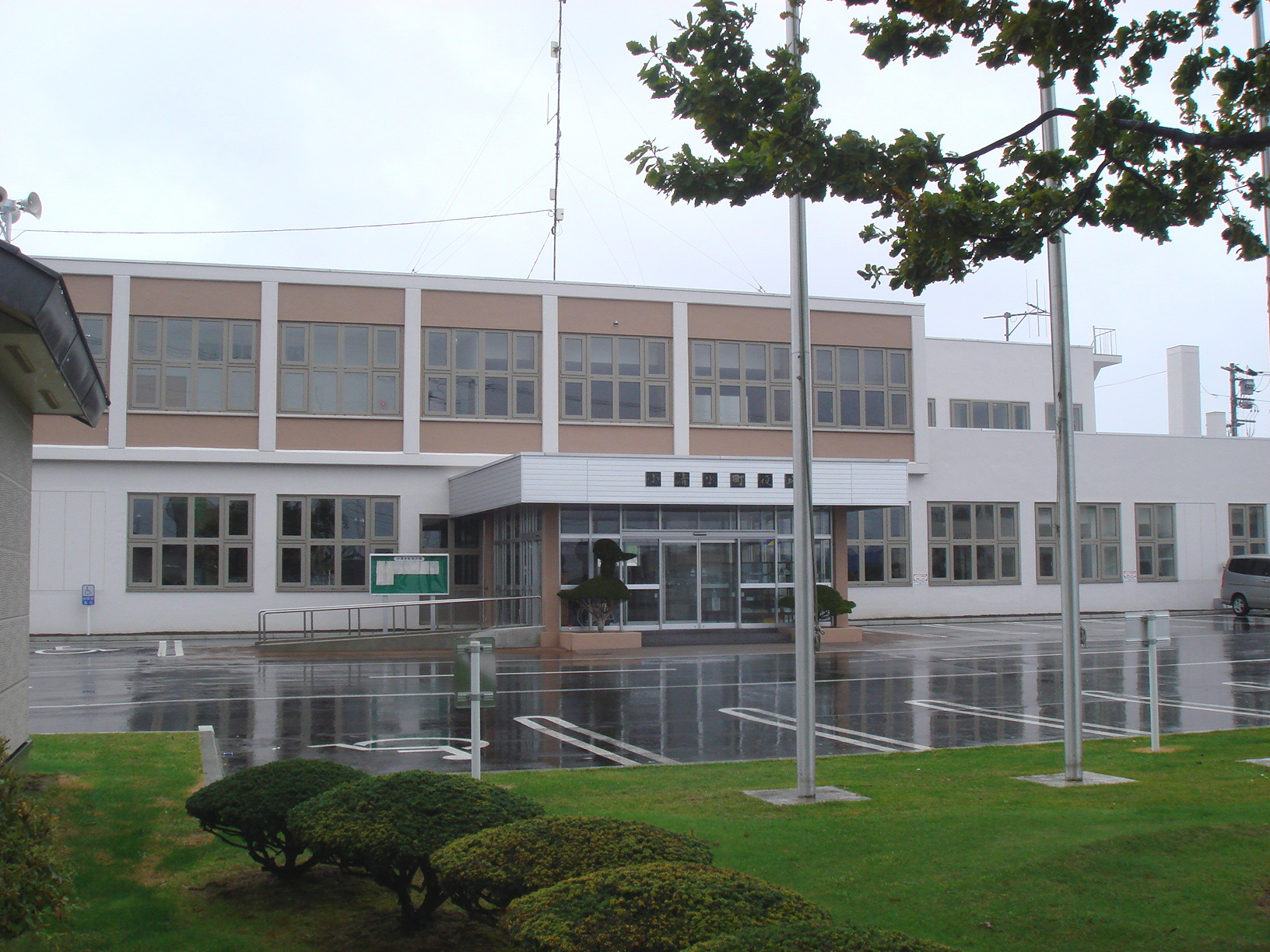
- Town hall

- Flag Emblem

- Location of Koshimizu in Hokkaido (Okhotsk Subprefecture)

- Location in Japan
- Coordinates: 43°51′N 144°28′E
- Country: Japan
- Region: Hokkaido
- Prefecture: Hokkaido (Okhotsk Subprefecture)
- District: Shari

Area
  - Total: 287.04 km^{2} (110.83 sq mi)

Population (May 1, 2017)
  - Total: 5,029
  - Density: 17.52/km^{2} (45.38/sq mi)
- Time zone: UTC+09:00 (JST)
- Climate: Dfb
- Website: www.town.koshimizu.hokkaido.jp

Koshimizu (小清水町, Koshimizu-chō) is a town in Okhotsk Subprefecture, Hokkaido, Japan.

== Population ==
As of May 1, 2017, the town had an estimated population of 5,029 and a population density of 18 persons per squared kilometre. The total area is 287.04 km^{2}.

== Mascots ==
Hogaja and Denbo, the town's mascots

Koshimizu's mascots are Hogaja (ほがじゃ) and Denbo (でん坊). They are appointed as mascots on October 3, 2013.

- Hogaja is a pouch. He lives with his family in the Hogaja Koshimizu Hokuyo Factory. He is bright, energetic and lively but embarrassed and sloppy at the same time. He usually helps import potato starches and collects headbands. His birthday is July 1. His friend, Oishikunare (おいしくなーれ), who is a Hogaja rice cracker, usually rides him.
- Denbo is a denpun dango. He makes denpun dango for a living. His eyes, nose and mouth (which are his charm points) resembled kidney beans. He wears an orange bandana with his personal mon and carris a spatula (which he can use it to cook food or use as a weapon). His favourite colours are orange, navy blue and brown. He is unveiled on July 28, 2013.

== Climate ==
Climate data for Koshimizu (1991−2020 normals, extremes 1977−present)
Month	Jan	Feb	Mar	Apr	May	Jun	Jul	Aug	Sep	Oct	Nov	Dec	Year
Record high °C (°F)	8.9 (48.0)	10.2 (50.4)	19.0 (66.2)	32.8 (91.0)	36.7 (98.1)	34.9 (94.8)	36.3 (97.3)	36.1 (97.0)	33.6 (92.5)	27.0 (80.6)	21.7 (71.1)	15.3 (59.5)	36.7 (98.1)
Mean daily maximum °C (°F)	−2.2 (28.0)	−2.0 (28.4)	2.4 (36.3)	9.7 (49.5)	16.0 (60.8)	19.6 (67.3)	23.1 (73.6)	24.6 (76.3)	21.4 (70.5)	15.4 (59.7)	7.9 (46.2)	0.7 (33.3)	11.4 (52.5)
Daily mean °C (°F)	−6.7 (19.9)	−6.8 (19.8)	−2.0 (28.4)	4.4 (39.9)	10.1 (50.2)	14.3 (57.7)	18.1 (64.6)	19.6 (67.3)	16.2 (61.2)	9.9 (49.8)	3.1 (37.6)	−3.9 (25.0)	6.4 (43.5)
Mean daily minimum °C (°F)	−13.0 (8.6)	−13.7 (7.3)	−7.7 (18.1)	−0.9 (30.4)	4.6 (40.3)	9.5 (49.1)	14.0 (57.2)	15.5 (59.9)	11.3 (52.3)	4.4 (39.9)	−2.1 (28.2)	−9.7 (14.5)	1.0 (33.8)
Record low °C (°F)	−27.3 (−17.1)	−32.8 (−27.0)	−25.4 (−13.7)	−17.6 (0.3)	−4.2 (24.4)	−1.6 (29.1)	2.9 (37.2)	5.1 (41.2)	−0.1 (31.8)	−5.4 (22.3)	−20.1 (−4.2)	−23.3 (−9.9)	−32.8 (−27.0)
Average precipitation mm (inches)	36.2 (1.43)	24.2 (0.95)	34.9 (1.37)	50.7 (2.00)	60.7 (2.39)	67.8 (2.67)	87.3 (3.44)	117.5 (4.63)	123.2 (4.85)	87.8 (3.46)	55.4 (2.18)	50.5 (1.99)	796.2 (31.35)
Average precipitation days (≥ 1.0 mm)	10.6	7.8	9.6	9.6	11.2	11.1	11.3	11.4	11.5	10.4	10.2	10.8	125.5
Mean monthly sunshine hours	93.5	116.4	152.0	165.5	174.5	167.2	165.3	158.7	151.4	145.3	112.2	100.6	1,702.6
Source: JMA

== See also ==
- Hama-Koshimizu Station
- Yamubetsu Station
