= Kiyosato, Hokkaido =

Kiyosato 清里町
- Town
- Flag Emblem

- Location of Kiyosato in Hokkaido (Okhotsk Subprefecture)

- Location in Japan
- Coordinates: 43°50′N 144°36′E
- Country: Japan
- Region: Hokkaido
- Prefecture: Hokkaido (Okhotsk Subprefecture)
- District: Shari

Area
  - Total: 402.73 km^{2} (155.49 sq mi)

Population (August 30, 2026)
  - Total: 3,502
  - Density: 8.696/km^{2} (22.52/sq mi)
- Time zone: UTC+09:00 (JST)
- Website: www.town.kiyosato.hokkaido.jp

Kiyosato (清里町, Kiyosato-chō) is a town in Okhotsk Subprefecture, Hokkaido, Japan.

As of August 2026, the town has an estimated population of 3,502 and a population density of 10 persons per km^{2}. The total area is 402.73 km^{2} (155.49 sq mi).

== Industry ==
Kiyosato is near Mount Shari and uses the spring water to make a distinct variety of shōchū using potatoes grown only in Hokkaido.

== Mascot ==
Kiyopi, the town's mascot

Kiyosato's mascot is Kiyopi (きよっぴ). She is a fairy who is a good dancer. She wears a hat with a potato flower on it, a masu salon hair clipping on her bangs and a pair of wooden snowshoes that resembled Kaminoko Pond. Her body is made of trees from the pond. She dyed her bangs to look the Sakura Falls. She is unveiled on 15 February 2014.

== Notable people from Kiyosato ==
- Tomomi Okazaki, speed skater
