= Shari District =

Shari 斜里郡
- District
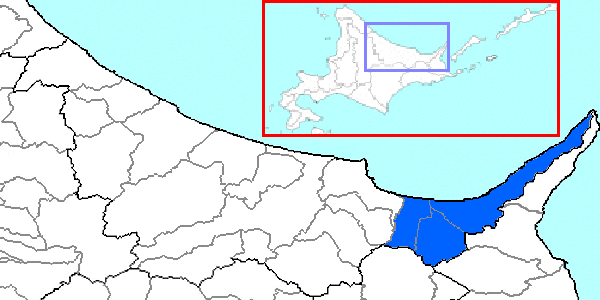
- The area of Shari District in Okhotsk Subprefecture.
- Country: Japan
- Prefecture: Hokkaido
- Subprefecture: Okhotsk

Area
  - Total: 1,426.74 km^{2} (550.87 sq mi)

Population (2004)
  - Total: 24,608
  - Density: 17.248/km^{2} (44.671/sq mi)

Shari (斜里郡, Shari-gun) is a district located in Okhotsk Subprefecture, Hokkaido, Japan.

== Population ==
As of 2004, the district has an estimated population of 24,608 and a population density of 17.25 persons per km^{2}. The total area is 1,426.74 km^{2}.

== History ==
In 1869, when Hokkaido was divided into 11 provinces and 86 districts, Shari was placed in Kitami Province.

== Towns and villages ==
- Kiyosato
- Koshimizu
- Shari
