= Shari, Hokkaido =

Shari 斜里町
- Town
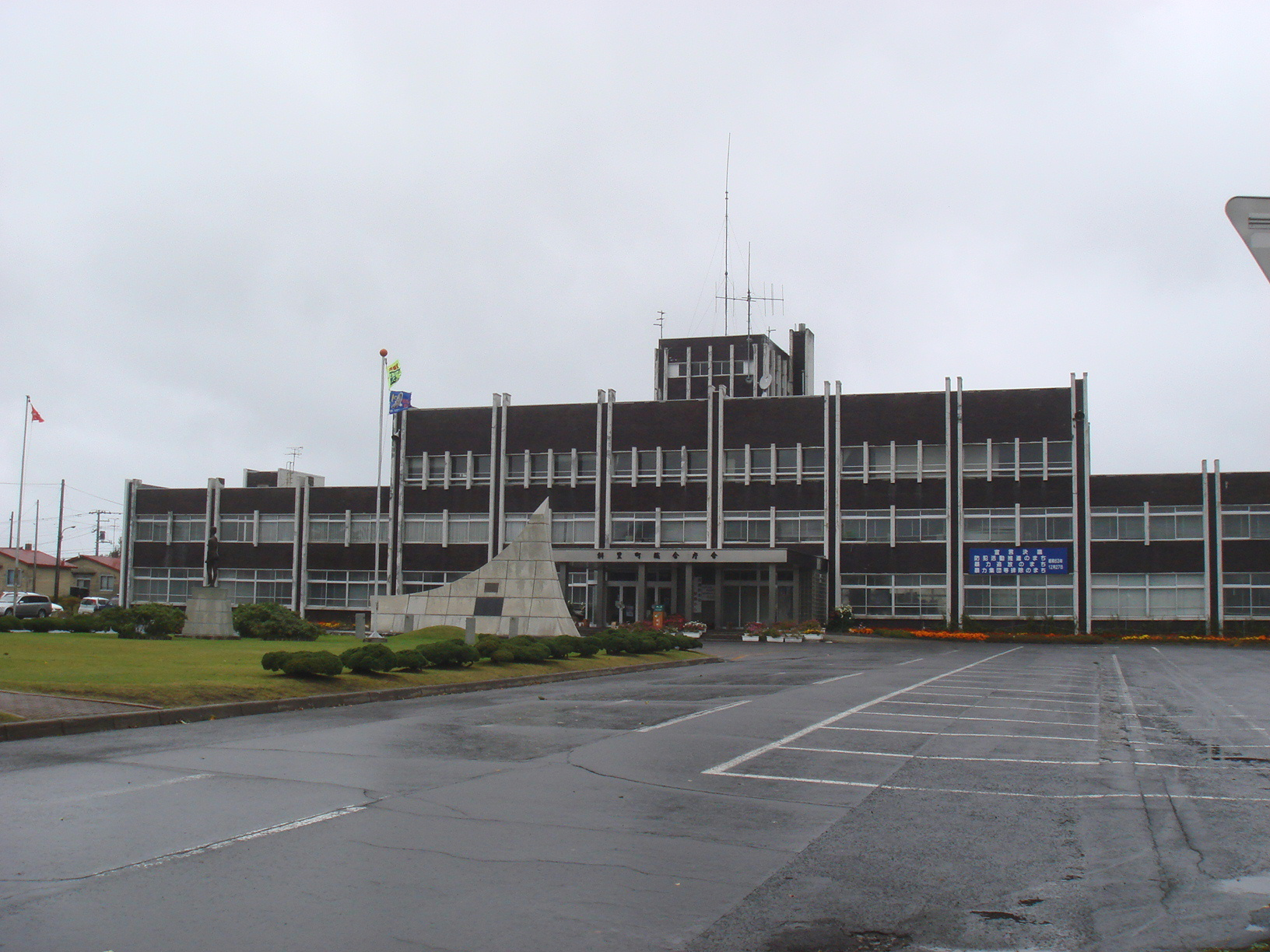
- Shari Town Office

- Flag Seal

- Location of Shari in Hokkaido (Okhotsk Subprefecture)

- Location in Japan
- Coordinates: 43°55′N 144°40′E
- Country: Japan
- Region: Hokkaido
- Prefecture: Hokkaido (Okhotsk Subprefecture)
- District: Shari

Area
  - Total: 736.97 km^{2} (284.55 sq mi)

Population (October 1, 2020)
  - Total: 11,418
  - Density: 15.493/km^{2} (40.127/sq mi)
- Time zone: UTC+09:00 (JST)
- Postal code: 099-4192
- Climate: Dfb
- Website: www.town.shari.hokkaido.jp
- Symbols
- Flower: Rosa rugosa
- Tree: Mizunara

Shari (斜里町, Shari-chō) is a town located in Okhotsk Subprefecture, Hokkaido, Japan.

== Population ==
As of October 2020, the town has an estimated population of 11,418 and a population density of 15 persons per km^{2}. The total area is 736.97 km^{2}.

== History ==
During World War 2 on 22 June 1945 Shari came under attack from the submarine USS Barb. This attack was notable for being the first submarine-based rocket attack against a surface target.

== Notable people from Shari ==
- Tatsuhikari Kumagoro, former sumo wrestler
- Tsutomu Takebe, politician

== Attractions ==
Shiretoko National Park is situated within Shari.

== Climate ==
Climate data for Shari (1991−2020 normals, extremes 1977−present)
Month	Jan	Feb	Mar	Apr	May	Jun	Jul	Aug	Sep	Oct	Nov	Dec	Year
Record high °C (°F)	9.7 (49.5)	11.9 (53.4)	19.9 (67.8)	31.2 (88.2)	35.0 (95.0)	32.8 (91.0)	36.7 (98.1)	37.1 (98.8)	34.4 (93.9)	26.8 (80.2)	21.5 (70.7)	15.3 (59.5)	37.1 (98.8)
Mean daily maximum °C (°F)	−2.2 (28.0)	−2.1 (28.2)	2.1 (35.8)	9.2 (48.6)	15.6 (60.1)	19.1 (66.4)	22.6 (72.7)	24.3 (75.7)	21.2 (70.2)	15.3 (59.5)	7.8 (46.0)	0.7 (33.3)	11.1 (52.0)
Daily mean °C (°F)	−6.5 (20.3)	−7.0 (19.4)	−2.3 (27.9)	4.1 (39.4)	9.8 (49.6)	13.8 (56.8)	17.7 (63.9)	19.3 (66.7)	16.0 (60.8)	9.9 (49.8)	3.2 (37.8)	−3.5 (25.7)	6.2 (43.2)
Mean daily minimum °C (°F)	−12.7 (9.1)	−13.9 (7.0)	−8.1 (17.4)	−1.0 (30.2)	4.1 (39.4)	8.8 (47.8)	13.2 (55.8)	14.8 (58.6)	10.8 (51.4)	4.2 (39.6)	−1.6 (29.1)	−9.1 (15.6)	0.8 (33.4)
Record low °C (°F)	−27.8 (−18.0)	−31.6 (−24.9)	−25.7 (−14.3)	−19.1 (−2.4)	−4.5 (23.9)	−1.2 (29.8)	2.6 (36.7)	4.2 (39.6)	0.7 (33.3)	−4.8 (23.4)	−20.1 (−4.2)	−24.0 (−11.2)	−31.6 (−24.9)
Average precipitation mm (inches)	35.1 (1.38)	24.4 (0.96)	37.0 (1.46)	52.2 (2.06)	60.2 (2.37)	62.4 (2.46)	85.7 (3.37)	108.7 (4.28)	122.6 (4.83)	91.0 (3.58)	63.7 (2.51)	54.1 (2.13)	802.0 (31.57)
Average snowfall cm (inches)	153 (60)	124 (49)	100 (39)	30 (12)	1 (0.4)	0 (0)	0 (0)	0 (0)	0 (0)	1 (0.4)	17 (6.7)	101 (40)	524 (206)
Average precipitation days (≥ 1.0 mm)	11.0	7.8	8.6	10.2	10.8	10.4	11.0	11.3	11.3	10.9	11.9	11.1	126.3
Average snowy days	17.5	13.7	11.5	3.7	0.1	0	0	0	0	0	2.1	12.2	60.8
Mean monthly sunshine hours	78.2	112.9	151.7	171.3	180.4	175.0	176.1	167.2	155.9	141.5	101.4	88.7	1,700.4
Source: Japan Meteorological Agency

Climate data for Utoro, Shari (1991−2020 normals, extremes 1978−present)
Month	Jan	Feb	Mar	Apr	May	Jun	Jul	Aug	Sep	Oct	Nov	Dec	Year
Record high °C (°F)	10.8 (51.4)	15.8 (60.4)	21.0 (69.8)	28.7 (83.7)	33.6 (92.5)	32.9 (91.2)	34.2 (93.6)	35.3 (95.5)	32.9 (91.2)	27.2 (81.0)	21.9 (71.4)	15.6 (60.1)	35.3 (95.5)
Mean daily maximum °C (°F)	−2.7 (27.1)	−2.7 (27.1)	1.4 (34.5)	8.3 (46.9)	14.8 (58.6)	18.3 (64.9)	22.0 (71.6)	23.3 (73.9)	20.2 (68.4)	14.4 (57.9)	7.3 (45.1)	0.5 (32.9)	10.4 (50.7)
Daily mean °C (°F)	−5.3 (22.5)	−6.0 (21.2)	−2.0 (28.4)	4.0 (39.2)	9.8 (49.6)	13.5 (56.3)	17.3 (63.1)	18.8 (65.8)	15.6 (60.1)	10.1 (50.2)	3.7 (38.7)	−2.4 (27.7)	6.4 (43.6)
Mean daily minimum °C (°F)	−8.6 (16.5)	−10.0 (14.0)	−5.9 (21.4)	−0.3 (31.5)	4.9 (40.8)	8.9 (48.0)	13.2 (55.8)	14.8 (58.6)	11.4 (52.5)	5.8 (42.4)	0.1 (32.2)	−5.5 (22.1)	2.4 (36.3)
Record low °C (°F)	−18.3 (−0.9)	−20.8 (−5.4)	−20.9 (−5.6)	−10.5 (13.1)	−3.8 (25.2)	−0.5 (31.1)	3.5 (38.3)	6.0 (42.8)	3.4 (38.1)	−2.2 (28.0)	−9.6 (14.7)	−13.9 (7.0)	−20.9 (−5.6)
Average precipitation mm (inches)	76.9 (3.03)	54.9 (2.16)	72.2 (2.84)	98.2 (3.87)	104.6 (4.12)	84.2 (3.31)	101.2 (3.98)	132.5 (5.22)	143.5 (5.65)	130.1 (5.12)	105.5 (4.15)	112.7 (4.44)	1,202.1 (47.33)
Average snowfall cm (inches)	168 (66)	136 (54)	118 (46)	46 (18)	7 (2.8)	0 (0)	0 (0)	0 (0)	0 (0)	1 (0.4)	29 (11)	138 (54)	635 (250)
Average precipitation days (≥ 1.0 mm)	15.3	10.5	10.6	10.6	11.7	11.0	11.1	11.5	12.3	12.3	13.9	15.1	145.9
Average snowy days	18.4	14.0	12.2	5.3	0.6	0	0	0	0	0.2	3.3	16.4	70.4
Mean monthly sunshine hours	59.3	91.6	130.7	157.0	175.1	170.5	173.3	162.2	148.5	128.4	77.3	53.5	1,527.2
Source: Japan Meteorological Agency
