= Dogū with palms pressed together =

Japanese clay figurine

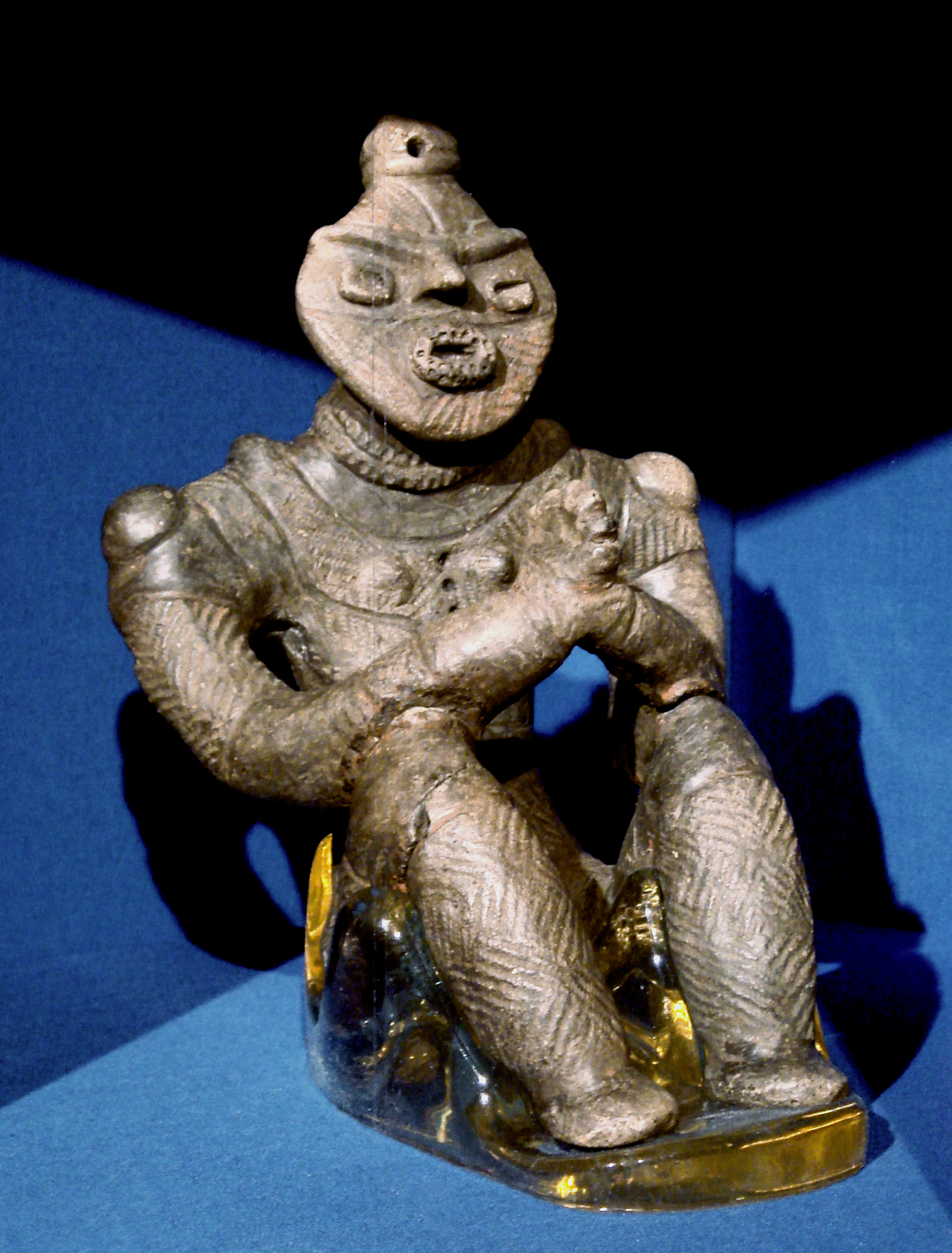
- "Dogu with palms pressed together", 2nd millennium BC
- Height: 19.8 cm
- Width: 14.2 cm
- Created: c. 1500 BC
- Discovered: July 1989; Hachinohe, Aomori, Japan
- Present location: Hachinohe, Aomori, Japan

The so-called "dogū with palms pressed together" (合掌土偶, gasshō dogū) is a Japanese dogū or clay figurine of the late Jōmon period (c. 2000–1000 BC). Excavated from the Kazahari I Site in Hachinohe, Aomori Prefecture, it is exhibited at the nearby Korekawa Jōmon Kan. Alongside "Hollow Dogū" from Hokkaidō, "Jōmon Goddess" from Yamagata Prefecture, and "Jōmon Venus" and "Masked Goddess" from Nagano Prefecture, it is one of five dogū that have been designated National Treasures.

== Kazahari I Site ==
The Kazahari I Site (風張1遺跡) is located some 4.3 kilometres (2.7 mi) to the south of Hachinohe City Hall, on the right bank of the River Niida, with the river to the north and an area of swampy ground to the south. The Korekawa Site is on the opposite bank. The site extends some 470 metres (1,540 ft) from east to west and 250 metres (820 ft) from north to south, covering an area of 75,000 square metres (810,000 sq ft), at an altitude of 20 to 30 metres (66 to 98 ft). Excavated by the Hachinohe City Board of Education over five seasons from 1988 to 1992, 15,700 square metres (169,000 sq ft) have been investigated to date, revealing a history of settlement over the longue durée, with finds from the early, middle, late, and final Jōmon period, Yayoi period, Nara period, and Heian period. In the second half of the late Jōmon period (second millennium BC), the settlement took the form of a large circular village, complete with pit dwellings, storage pits, and sunken buildings with earthfast posts, concentrically arranged around two groups of graves.

== Excavation ==
The dogū with palms pressed together was unearthed during rescue excavation in July 1989. It was found at pit dwelling no. 15 by the inner north wall opposite the entrance, its back to the wall, facing into the house. A missing part of the left leg was found in the floor 2.5 metres (8.2 ft) to the west. Typically recovered from external deposits, it is relatively unusual for a dogū to be excavated in this way from inside a residence. One of seventy dogū from Kazahari I, it is the only one that is complete.

== Description ==
The dogū with palms pressed together measures 19.8 cm (7.8 in) in height, 14.2 cm (5.6 in) in width, and 15.2 cm (6.0 in) in depth. A female figure with small breasts and exposed genitalia, she sits with her knees raised, her arms resting on her legs, her (six-fingered) hands clasped together, as if in prayer. Her mouth, nose, eyes, and eyebrows – or those of a mask she may be wearing – are formed from appliqué strips of clay. She has a double incised necklace and no ears, while the top of her head tapers as if she is wearing a hat or has her hair up, complete with a hole as for a proto-kanzashi. From surviving pigment on the face and body, it is thought the entire figurine was once painted red. Traces of bitumen on the cracked left leg indicate a historic repair, suggesting the object was highly valued by its Jōmon-period owner and in use for some time.

Many cruciform dogū with outstretched arms have been found in northeast Tōhoku, dating from the early- to mid-Jōmon period. In the first half of the late Jōmon period, faces become more three-dimensional, with greater attention paid to the legs. In the second half, there is greater individualisation and variation of poses, including swollen bellies to indicate pregnancy. Based on such stylistic criteria, as well on that of associated ceramic finds, the dogū has been dated to the second half of the late Jōmon period or around 1500 BC.

== Designation and exhibition ==
In 1996, an assemblage of some 666 late Jōmon artefacts excavated from the Kazahari I Site were designated an Important Cultural Property. In 2009, from among these objects, the dogū with palms pressed together was designated a National Treasure.

Housed at the Korekawa Jōmon Kan, Hachinohe City has licensed the brand of "clay figurine with clasped hands" to many local businesses. Exhibitions in which the figurine has featured include The Power of Dogu, at the British Museum in 2009, Dogū, a Cosmos, at the Miho Museum in 2012, and Jomon: 10,000 Years of Prehistoric Art in Japan, at Tokyo National Museum in 2018.

== See also ==
- List of National Treasures of Japan (archaeological materials)
- Jōmon Venus
- Hollow Dogū
- Historic Sites of Aomori Prefecture
