= Dogū from the Wanishi Site =

1st millennium BC Japanese clay figurine

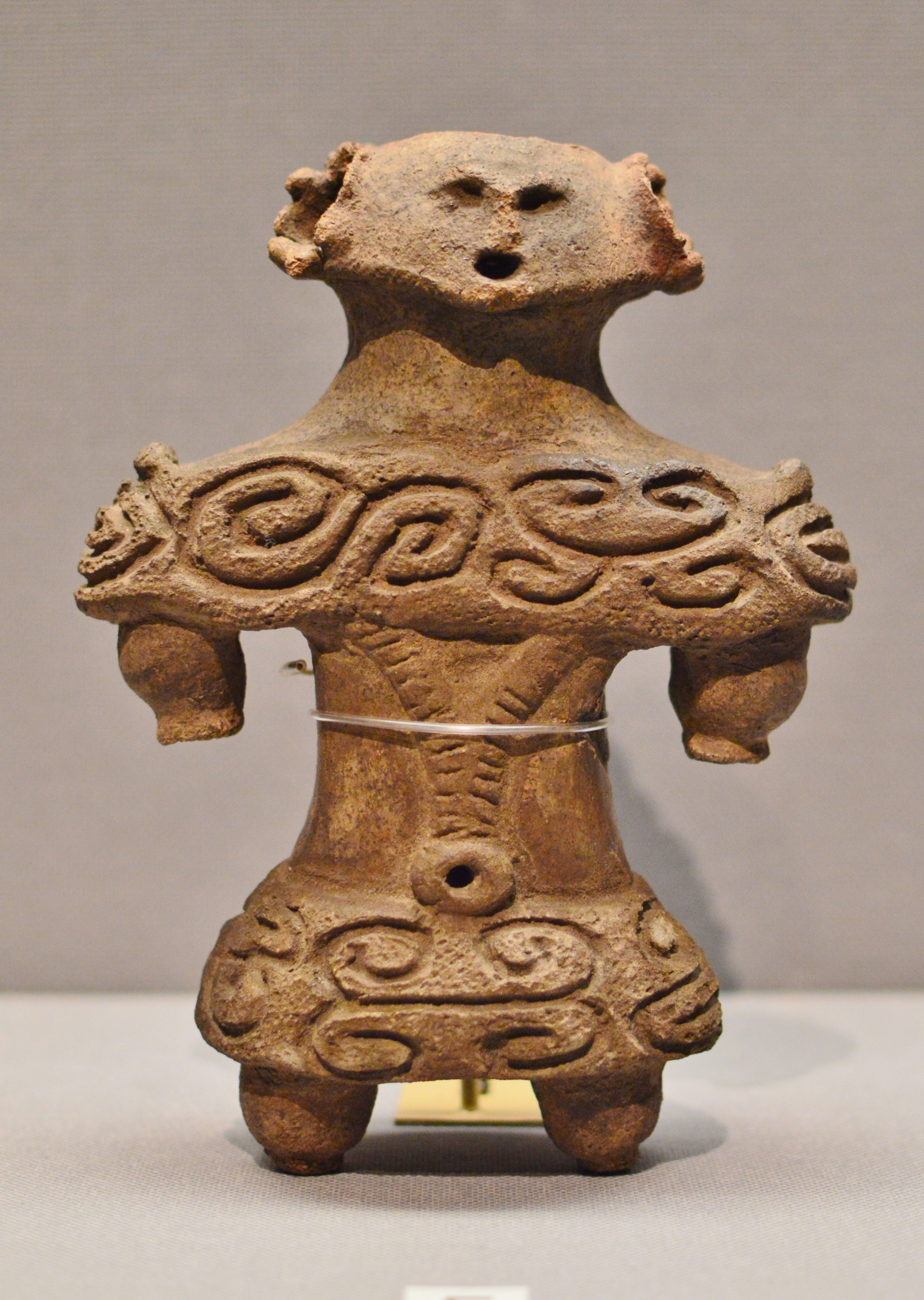
- Material: Clay
- Height: 19.2 cm
- Width: 14.1 cm
- Created: c. 700 BC
- Discovered: 1918; Muroran, Hokkaido, Japan
- Present location: Tokyo, Japan

The dogū (土偶) from the Wanishi Site is a Japanese dogū or clay figurine of the Final Jōmon period (c. 1000–400 BC). Excavated in Muroran, Hokkaido, and now part of the collection of the Tokyo National Museum, it has been designated an Important Cultural Property.

== Wanishi Site ==
The dogū was recovered intact in 1918 from the Wanishi Site (輪西遺跡) in what was then the village of Wanishi (輪西村), today's city of Muroran. The site was part of an area used for company housing by the then Hokkaido Steel and Iron Company (北海道製鐵株式會社), which was established in 1917 and merged with the predecessor of today's Japan Steel Works in 1919, the Hokkaido Colliery & Steamship Company having begun operations at the Wanishi Iron Works (輪西製鉄場) (today's Nippon Steel Muroran Works) in 1909.

== Description ==
The hollow clay figurine has distinctively broad shoulders and hips, which are accentuated by the short arms and legs and adorned with irikumimon (入組文) patterning (applied without use of the surikeshi-jōmon or "erased-cord marking" technique) that has been likened to that found on the contemporary Ōbora-style ceramics (大洞式土器) of Tōhoku. Unlike the large-eyed shakōkidogū, the eyes are small and recessed. At the sides of the head are what may be mage or knots of hair. The navel is prominent and there are holes at the ends of the arms and the legs as well as in the groin. The figurine is painted red.

The dogū measures 19.2 centimetres (7.6 in) in height, has a width of 14.1 centimetres (5.6 in) and a depth of 6.8 centimetres (2.7 in), and weighs some 790 grams (1 lb 12 oz).

== Gallery ==
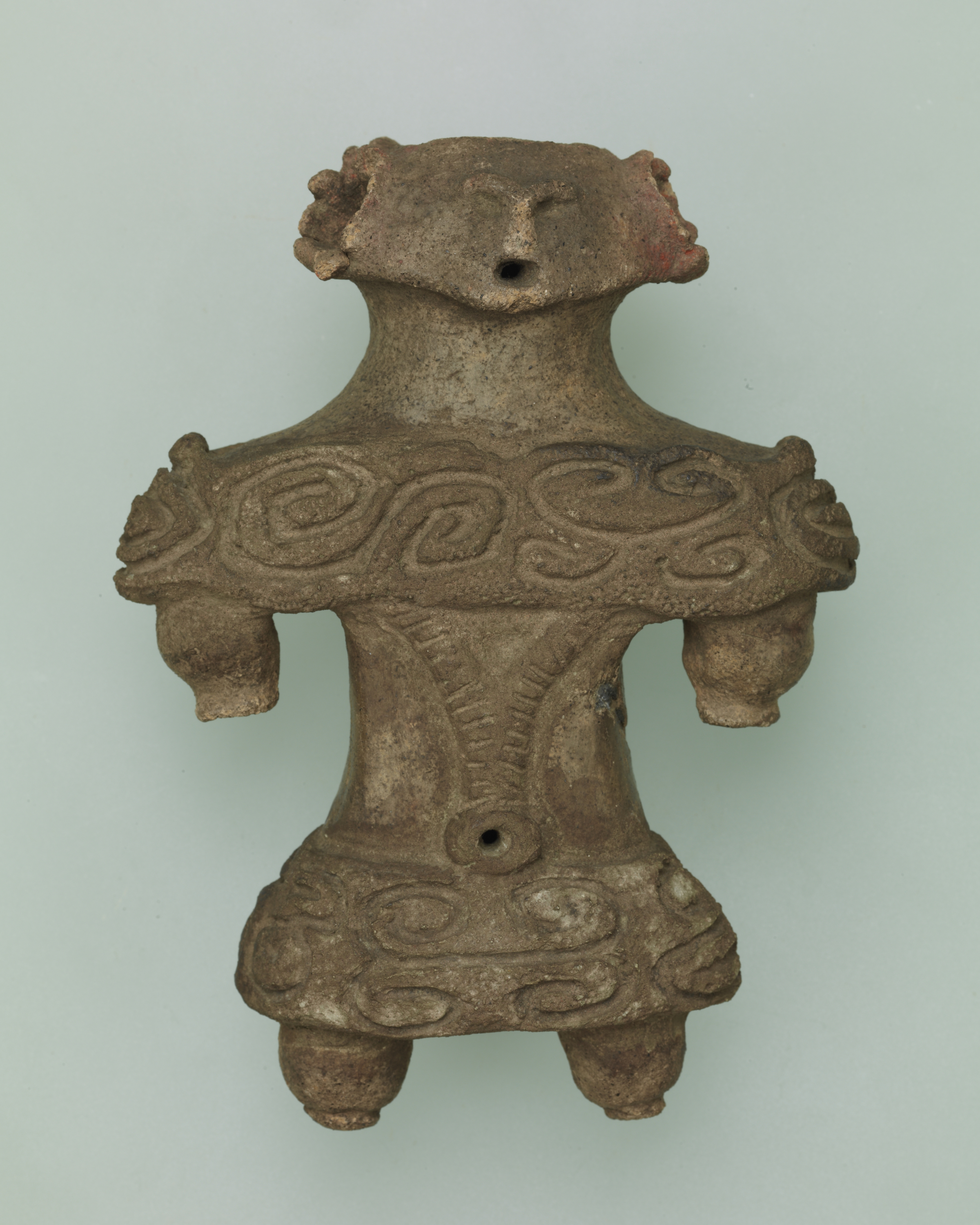
Front of dogū

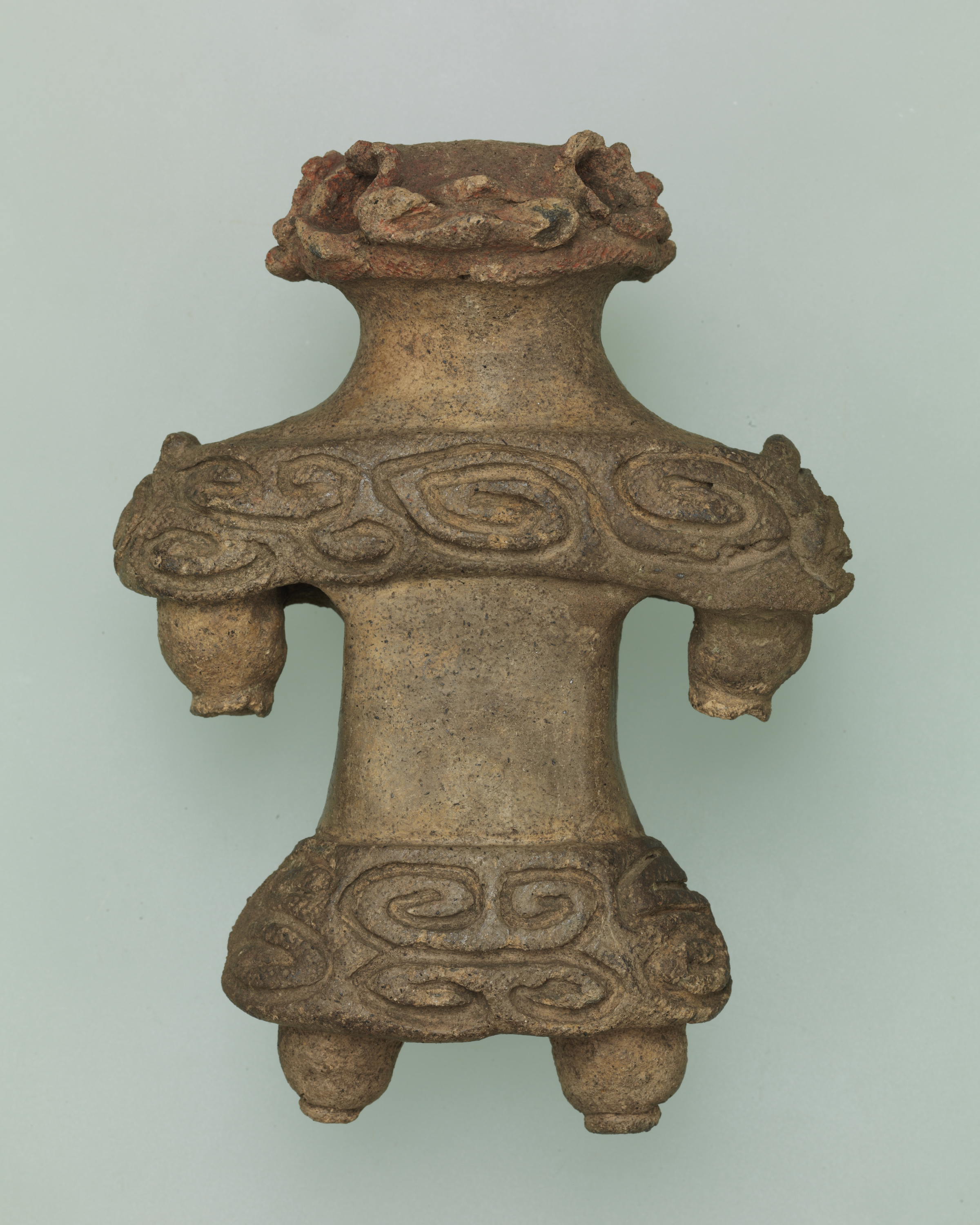
Back of dogū

== See also ==
- List of National Treasures of Japan (archaeological materials)
- List of Cultural Properties of Japan – archaeological materials (Hokkaidō)
- Jōmon Prehistoric Sites in Northern Japan
- Historic Sites of Hokkaidō
- Hollow Dogū
