= Masked Goddess =

2nd millennium BC Japanese clay figurine

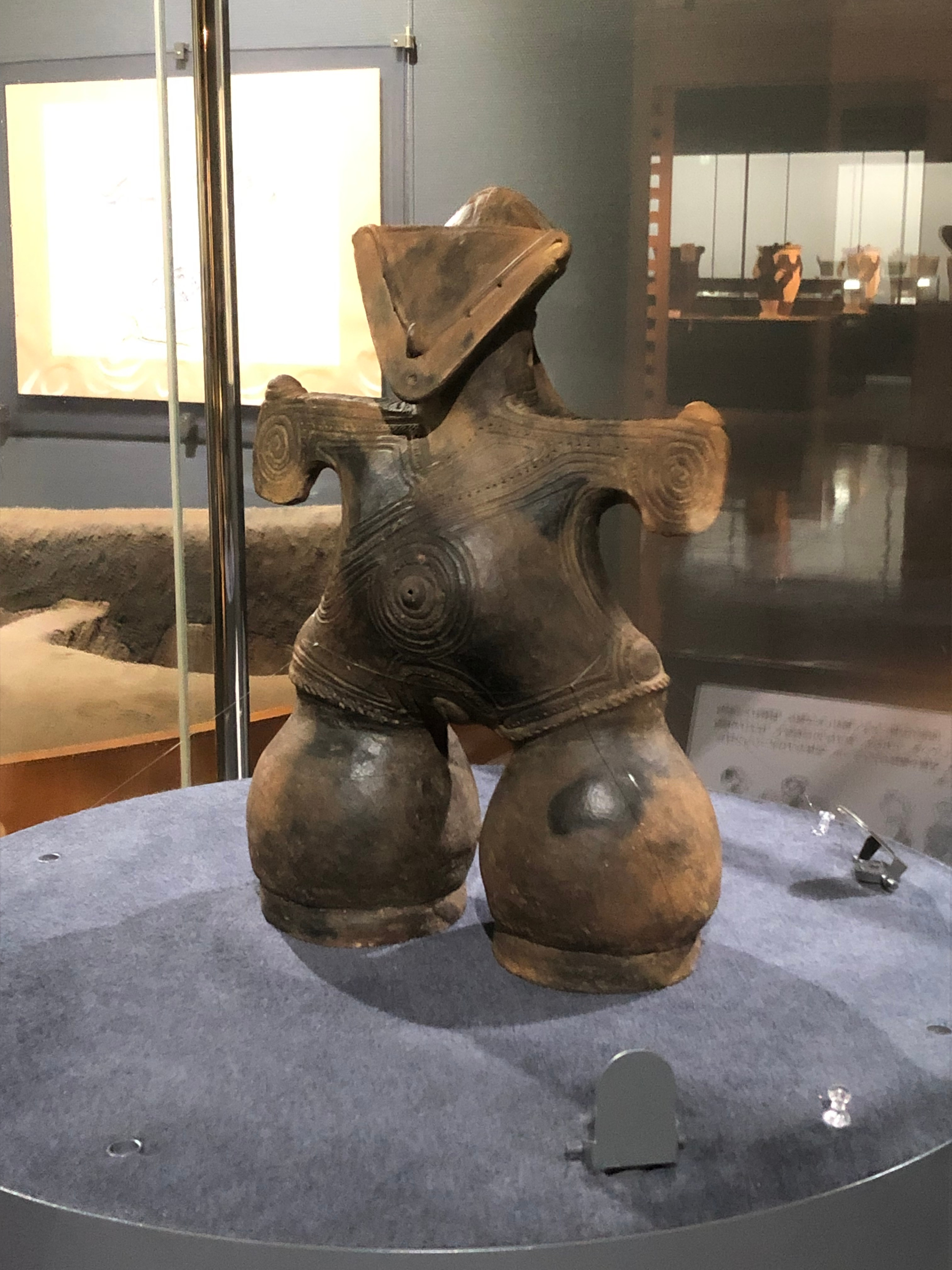
- "Masked Goddess", 2nd millennium BC
- Material: Clay
- Height: 34 cm
- Created: c. 1500 BC
- Discovered: 23 August 2000; Chino, Nagano, Japan
- Present location: Chino, Nagano, Japan

The Masked Goddess (仮面の女神, Kamen no Megami) is a relatively large Japanese dogū or clay figurine of the late Jōmon period (c. 2000–1000 BC). Excavated from the Nakappara Site in Chino, Nagano Prefecture, it is exhibited at the nearby Togariishi Museum of Jōmon Archaeology. Alongside the "Hollow Dogū" from Hokkaidō, the "dogū with palms pressed together" from Aomori Prefecture, "Jōmon Goddess" from Yamagata Prefecture, and "Jōmon Venus" that was also excavated in Chino, it is one of five dogū that have been designated National Treasures.

== Nakappara Site ==
The Nakappara Site (中ッ原遺跡) where the Masked Goddess was found is a Middle- to early Late- Jōmon site (c. 4th–2nd millennium BC) covering an area of some 3.2 hectares (7.9 acres) of what is now Chino in a mountainous area of central Honshū. From the site, Mount Kirigamine, Mount Tateshina, Mount Yatsugatake, and Mount Moriya are all visible. The Nakappara Site occupies the plateau on a ridge running some 320 metres (1,050 ft) east to west and 100 metres (330 ft) north to south, at an altitude of approximately 950 metres (3,120 ft) a.s.l. Long-recognized as a site of archaeological and historic importance, Prince Fushimi Hiroyasu conducted initial excavations in 1929. Further excavation between 1992 and 2001 uncovered over two hundred pit-dwellings and 3,300 post-holes, burial pits, and storage areas. Finds include a large quantity of stone tools and earthenware, obsidian, jade, and amber. Eight ceramic vessels found near the pit in which the dogū was excavated are included within the National Treasure designation. The Tanabatake Site (棚畑遺跡), where the dogū known as Jōmon Venus was found, is not far away, making the area one of great importance for dogū studies.

== Excavation ==
The Masked Goddess was excavated on 23 August 2000 from pit No. 70, one of what is understood to have been a series of burial pits near the centre of the site. It was likely interred alongside the deceased as a funerary offering. The figurine was found lying on its left side, its left arm touching the pit floor. Its right leg had been intentionally broken, possibly relating to some misfortune afflicting the deceased, and the pieces variously positioned. Most of the right leg was oriented at ninety degrees to how it would have naturally joined to the hip, with fragments found inside both the bulk of the right leg and the torso.

== Description ==
The hollow figurine takes its name from the tilted, triangular mask that covers the face, with lines on top resembling the string with which such a mask might be tied on—or her eyebrows. There is a small hole near the point, as if for the mouth, with smaller holes above perhaps for the nostrils. The short, extended, stylized arms culminate in spiral pattern ornament. Concentric circles ring the slight "protuberance" upon the belly, the swelling of which is perhaps suggestive of pregnancy. Below are feminine wide hips and "realistic female genitalia". Her rather solid legs have been likened to inverted clay pots. The incised decoration, suggestive of clothing, includes a sash-like design extending from the left shoulder to the right flank, and is to be found also on the back, alongside areas of the "erased cord marking" (surikeshi-jōmon) that is common on contemporary ceramic vessels. In some areas, the burnishing is such that the surface almost shines.

The figurine is 34 centimetres (13 in) in height and weighs some 2.7 kilograms (6.0 lb), making it relatively large amongst dogū. It was produced by joining strips of clay, resulting in its hollow form. The small holes on the top of the head, at the mouth, on the side of the neck, on the belly, between the legs, and on the soles of the feet, are not only stylistic features but would also have helped vent air and prevent the dogū exploding during firing.

== Designation and exhibition ==
In 2006, the figurine was designated an Important Cultural Property, a designation upgraded in 2014 to that of National Treasure. Now restored, the dogū is owned by the city of Chino, where, like Jōmon Venus, she is on display at the Togariishi Museum of Jōmon Archaeology. Exhibitions in which the Masked Goddess has featured include The Power of Dogu, at the British Museum in 2009, Jomon: 10,000 Years of Prehistoric Art in Japan, at Tokyo National Museum in 2018, and later the same year, alongside the other four National Treasure dogū, Jōmon: Naissance de l'art dans le Japon préhistorique at the Japanese cultural House in Paris (French: Maison de la culture du Japon à Paris), as part of Japonisme 2018. A replica of the Masked Goddess is to be found at the Nakappara Jōmon Park (中ッ原縄文公園) in Chino, where the pit in which the dogū was found is preserved in its original location.

== See also ==
- List of National Treasures of Japan (archaeological materials)
- Jōmon Prehistoric Sites in Northern Japan
- Historic Sites of Nagano Prefecture
