= Ogata Station =

Ogata Station is the name of two train stations in Japan:

- Ogata Station (Akita) (小ヶ田駅)
- Ogata Station (Oita) (緒方駅)

== See also ==
- Ōgata Station, train station in Higashi-ku, Niigata, Niigata Prefecture, Japan
