= Korekawa Archaeological Institution (Korekawa Jōmon Kan) =

- 八戸市埋蔵文化財センター 是川縄文館
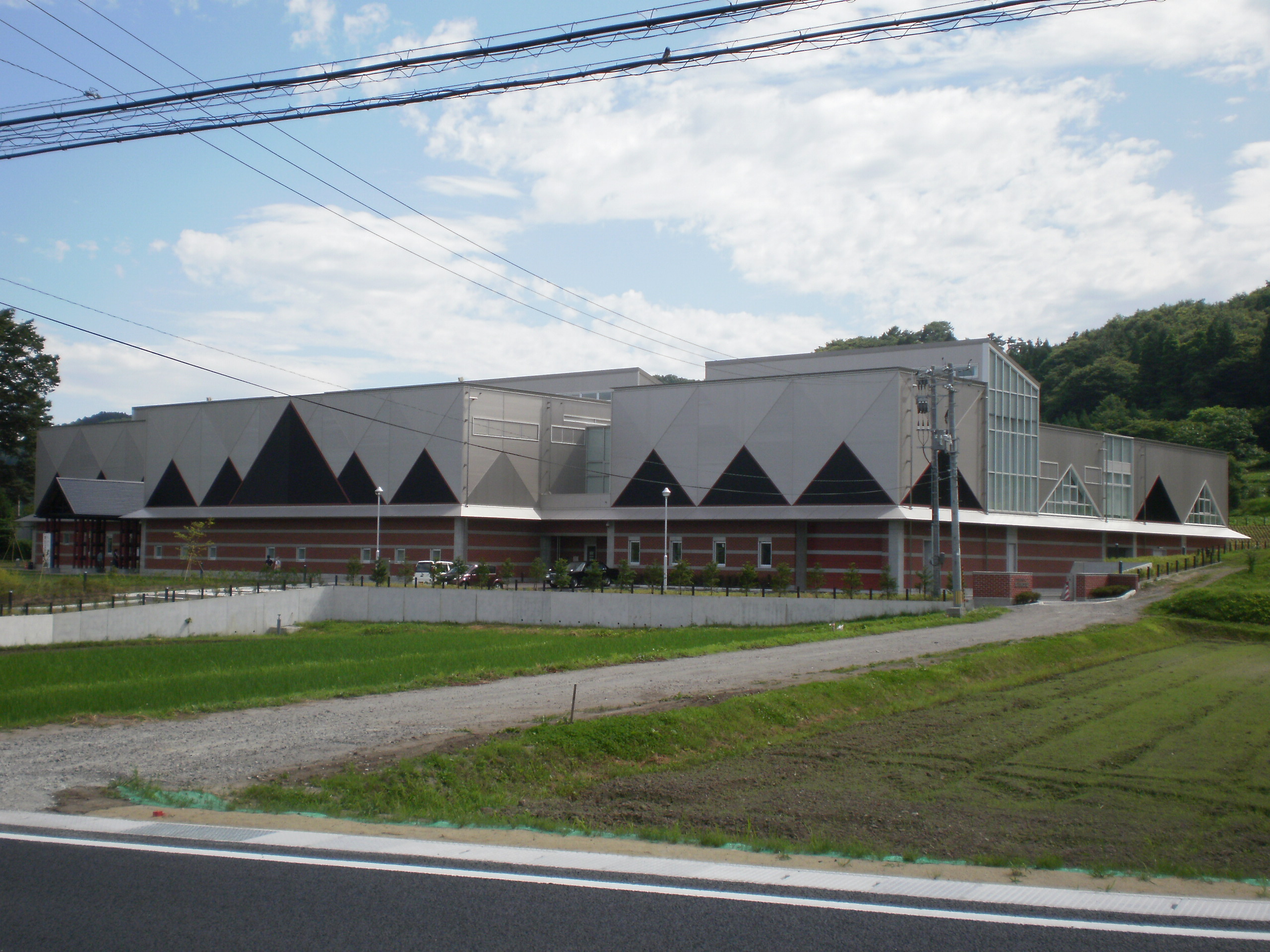
- Interactive map of the Korekawa Archaeological Institution (Korekawa Jōmon Kan) area

General information
- Location: Yokoyama-1, Korekawa, Hachinohe, Aomori Prefecture, Japan
- Coordinates: 40°28′33″N 141°29′18″E
- Opened: 10 July 2011

Website
- Official website

Korekawa Archaeological Institution (Korekawa Jōmon Kan) (八戸市埋蔵文化財センター 是川縄文館, Hachinohe-shi Maizō Bunkazai Sentā (Korekawa Jōmon-kan)), more literally the Hachinohe City Buried Cultural Property Center, opened in Hachinohe, Aomori Prefecture, Japan in 2011. It exhibits Jōmon materials from the nearby Korekawa Site and Kazahari I Site (風張１遺跡), finds at the latter including the "Palms Together Dogū" (合掌土偶) that has been designated a National Treasure.

== Gallery ==
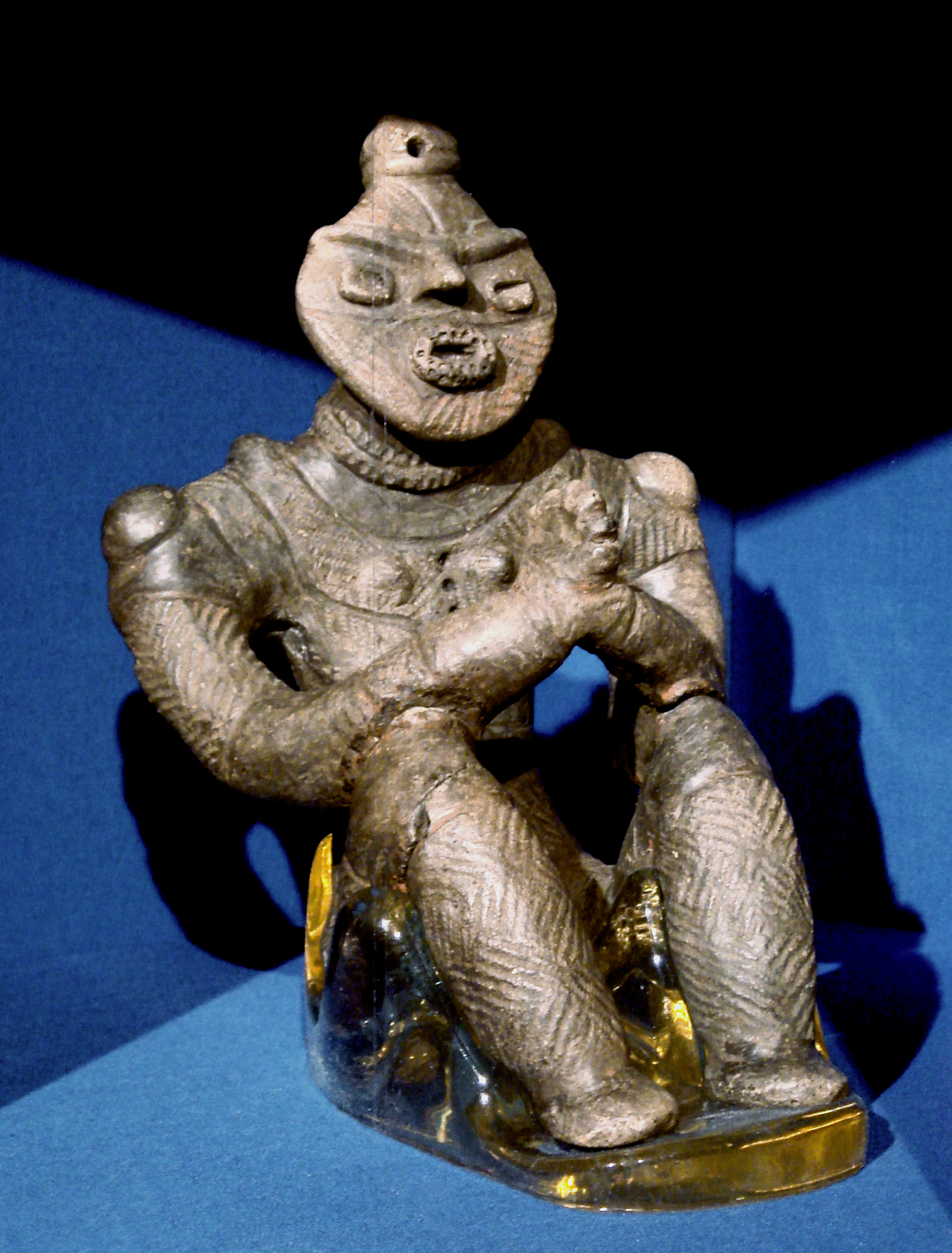
Dogū (NT)

== See also ==
- List of National Treasures of Japan (archaeological materials)
- Jōmon Archaeological Sites in Hokkaidō, Northern Tōhoku, and other regions
- List of Historic Sites of Japan (Aomori)
- Aomori Prefectural Museum
