= Isedōtai Ruins =

Archeological site in Japan

- 伊勢堂岱遺跡 (Japanese)
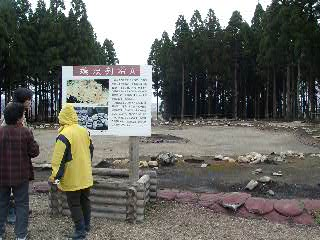
- Placard at Isedōtai ruins

- Isedōtai ruins Isedōtai Ruins (Japan)
- 40°12′04″N 140°20′53″E
- Type: landmark
- Periods: Jōmon period
- Region: JP

History
- Built: 2000 BCE

Site notes
- Area: 200,000 square metres (2,200,000 sq ft)
- Public access: Yes

The Isedōtai Ruins (伊勢堂岱遺跡, Isedōtai iseki) are a late Jōmon period archaeological site in the city of Kitaakita, Akita Prefecture, in the Tōhoku region of northern Japan. Discovered during the construction of a highway to nearby Odate–Noshiro Airport, the remains were designated a National Historic Site of Japan in 2001 by the Japanese government. The site is located approximately five minutes on foot from Ogata on the Akita Nairiku Railway.

== Site ==
The site consists of three large stone circles located on an artificially flattened plateau on the west bank of the Yoneshiro River. The largest circle is between 42 and 45 meters in diameter, and completely encloses a fourth stone circle. The stones, including porphyrite, rhyolite and tuff, were brought from rivers up to five kilometers away, and the site has a moat on its eastern side with a length of more than 100 meters. More than 100 pits have been found, both inside and outside the stone circles, containing terracotta plates and jars, and small clay objects along with hunting and fishing implements and everyday tools. No bones have been found, but soil discoloration indicates that the site was a necropolis and the objects found were ritual or grave-goods. Some 200 clay dogu have also been found on the site, many of which appear to have been intentionally broken. One of the stone circles contains a standing stone which appears to have served as a sun dial.

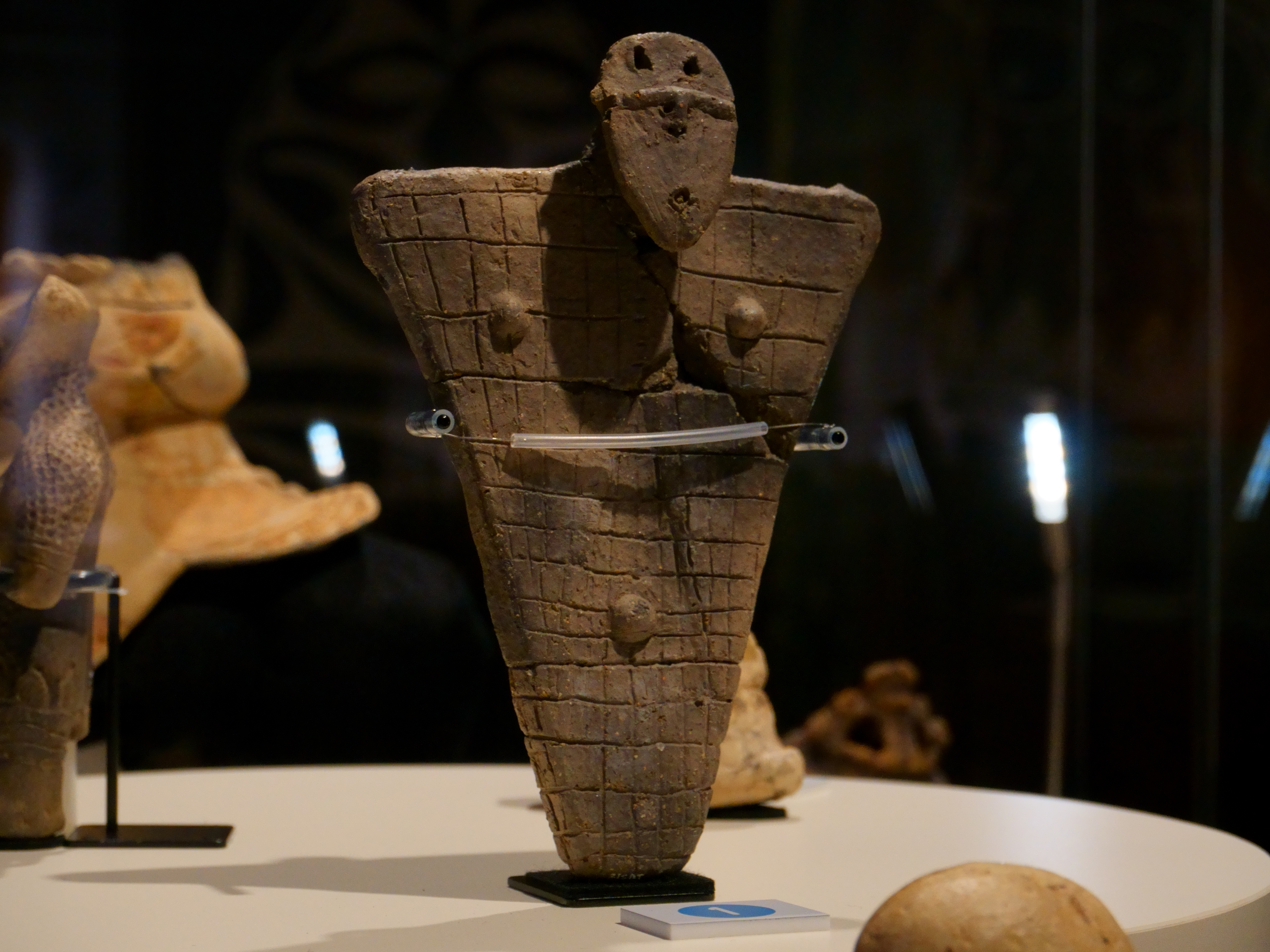
Plate-shaped dogū

Next to the stone circles, post holes indicate that as many as 37 pit-houses with a width of 3–5 meters and length of 6–7 meters were built on the site, although there is no indication that this was a permanently inhabited settlement.

There are no public facilities at site. Many of the artifacts recovered from the site are on display at the Kitaakita city Community Center.

The site has been submitted for inscription on the UNESCO World Heritage List as one of the Jōmon Archaeological Sites in Hokkaidō, Northern Tōhoku, and other regions.

== See also ==
- List of Historic Sites of Japan (Akita)
- Matagi
