= Ōfune Site =

Jōmon period archaeological site

- 大船遺跡 (Japanese)
- Location within Hokkaido Location within Japan
- 41°57′28″N 140°55′31″E
- Type: settlement
- Periods: Jōmon period
- Location: Hakodate, Japan
- Region: Hokkaido

History
- Built: 3500 to 2000 BC

Site notes
- Area: 71.832 square kilometers (27.734 mi^{2})
- Discovered: 1996
- Public access: Yes
- Website: jomon-japan.jp/en/jomon-sites/ofune/

The Ōfune Site (大船遺跡, Ōfune iseki) is an archaeological site consisting of a series of large shell middens and the remains of an adjacent settlement from the Jōmon period. The site is in what is now part of the city of Hakodate in Oshima Subprefecture on the island of Hokkaido in northern Japan. It has been protected by the central government as a Historic Site since 13 August 2001. The site covers an area of 71.832 square kilometers (7,183.2 ha; 27.734 mi^{2}).

== Early history ==
The Ōfune Site was a community with over 100 pit dwellings, including smaller family homes and some larger homes that were inhabited from 3500 BC to 2000 BC. The dates of the site's habitation correspond to the early and middle Jōmon period of Japanese history. The community was positioned alongside the Pacific Ocean, enabling easy access to fishing and whaling grounds and providing an avenue for the site's people to trade extensively with other communities in the Tōhoku region. Pottery from the Tōhoku region and central Hokkaido was found in the sites burial mound, providing basis for the site's function as a trade center.

== Modern history ==
The Ōfune Site was discovered during surveying work in 1996. Initial discoveries included a large pit dwelling, embankments, and a storage pit. The site was placed under the protection of the central government as a Historic Site on 13 August 2001. The protected site covers an area of 71.832 square kilometers (27.734 mi^{2}). On 29 December 2002, 70,000 excavated artifacts from the site were damaged or destroyed when a fire broke out in an exhibition room.

The Ōfune Site is one of the Jōmon Prehistoric Sites in Northern Japan, a group of Jōmon period archaeological sites in Hokkaido and northern Tōhoku that was recommended by Japan in 2020 for inclusion to the UNESCO World Heritage List, under criteria iii and iv. The submission currently resides on the Tentative List, with the decision to be included in the list to be announced in May 2021. It was then officially inscribed on the World Heritage List on 27 July 2021.

== See also ==
- Hakodate Jōmon Culture Center
- List of Historic Sites of Japan (Hokkaido)
