= Kakinoshima site =

Jōmon period archaeological site

- 垣ノ島遺跡 (Japanese)
- Location within Hokkaido Location within Japan
- 41°55′43.9″N 140°56′51″E
- Type: settlement
- Periods: Jōmon period
- Location: Hakodate, Japan
- Region: Hokkaido

History
- Built: 7000 to 1000 BC

Site notes
- Area: 92.749 square kilometers (35.811 mi^{2})
- Discovered: 2000
- Public access: Yes
- Website: jomon-japan.jp/en/jomon-sites/kakinoshima/

The Kakinoshima site (垣ノ島遺跡, Kakinoshima iseki) is an archaeological site consisting of a series of large shell middens and the remains of an adjacent settlement from the Jōmon period. The site is in what is now part of the city of Hakodate in Oshima Subprefecture on the island of Hokkaido in northern Japan. It has been protected by the central government as a Historic Site since 7 February 2011. The site covers an area of 92.749 square kilometers (35.811 mi^{2}).

== Early history ==
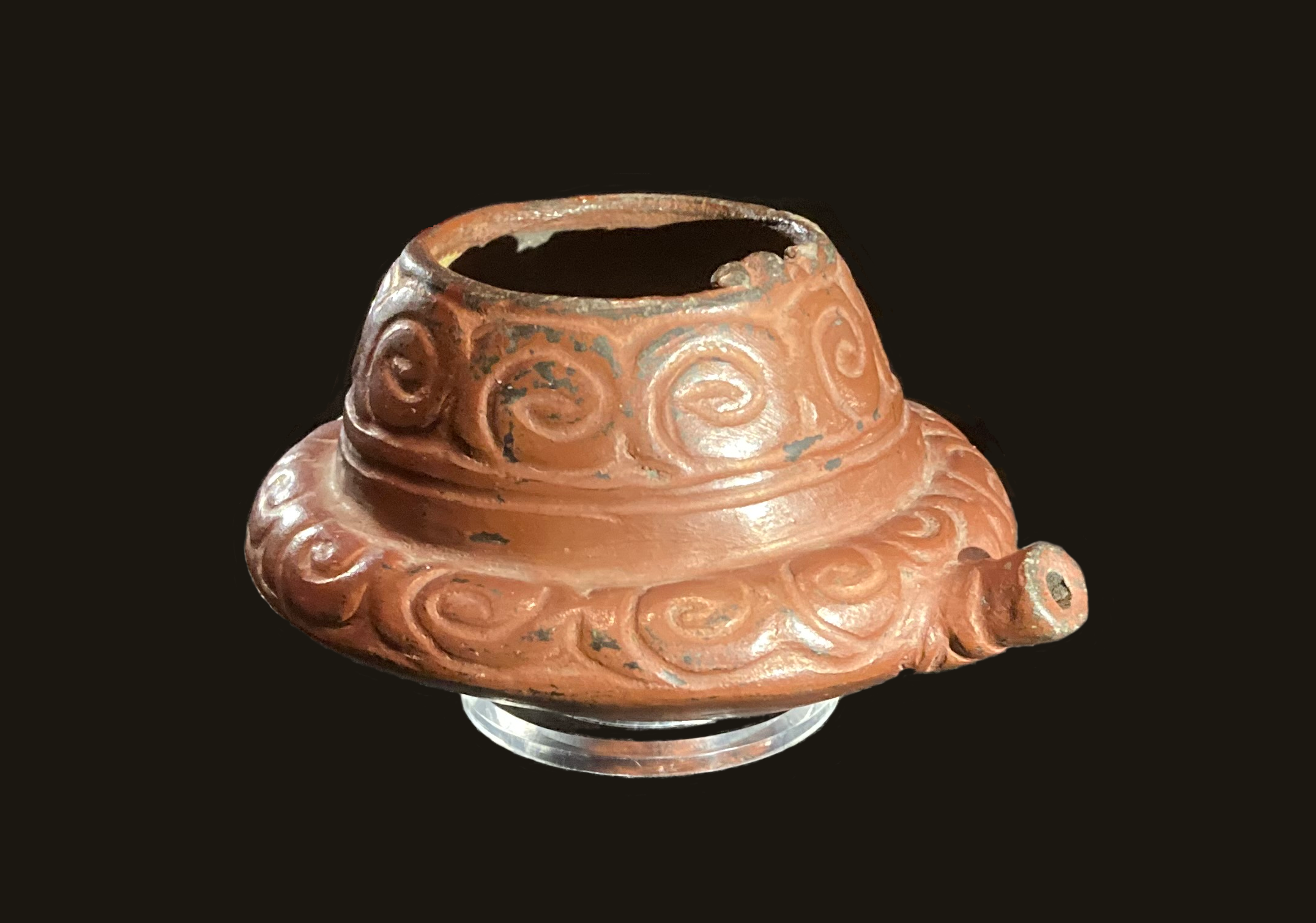
A Jōmon period red-lacquered spouted vessel similar to artifacts found at the Kakinoshima site

The Kakinoshima site was a community with several pit dwellings, including smaller family homes and some larger homes that were inhabited from 7000 BC to 1000 BC. The dates of the site's habitation correspond to the early, middle, and late subsections of the Jōmon period of Japanese history. The community was positioned on a marine terrace alongside the Pacific Ocean where two large earthen mounds were built by the inhabitants of the site. Artifacts found within the site include tablets with footprints that were found in a burial pit, a piece of jade jewelry, and 9,000 year old red lacquerware that are the oldest known pieces of lacquerware in the world.

== Modern history ==
The Kakinoshima site was discovered during surveying work in 2000. Initial discoveries included a large pit dwelling and a burial site for the occupants of the community. The site was placed under the protection of the central government as a Historic Site on 7 February 2011. The protected site covers an area of 92.749 square kilometers (35.811 mi^{2}). As of July 2019, less than 2 percent of the archaeological site had been excavated.

The Kakinoshima site is one of the Jōmon Archaeological Sites in Hokkaidō, Northern Tōhoku, and other regions (北海道・北東北を中心とした縄文遺跡群), a group of Jōmon period archaeological sites in Hokkaido and northern Tōhoku that was recommended by Japan in 2020 for inclusion in the UNESCO World Heritage List, under criteria iii and iv. It was then officially inscribed on the World Heritage List on 27 July 2021.

== See also ==
- Hakodate Jōmon Culture Center
- List of Historic Sites of Japan (Hokkaido)
