= Hollow Dogū =

Japanese clay figurine

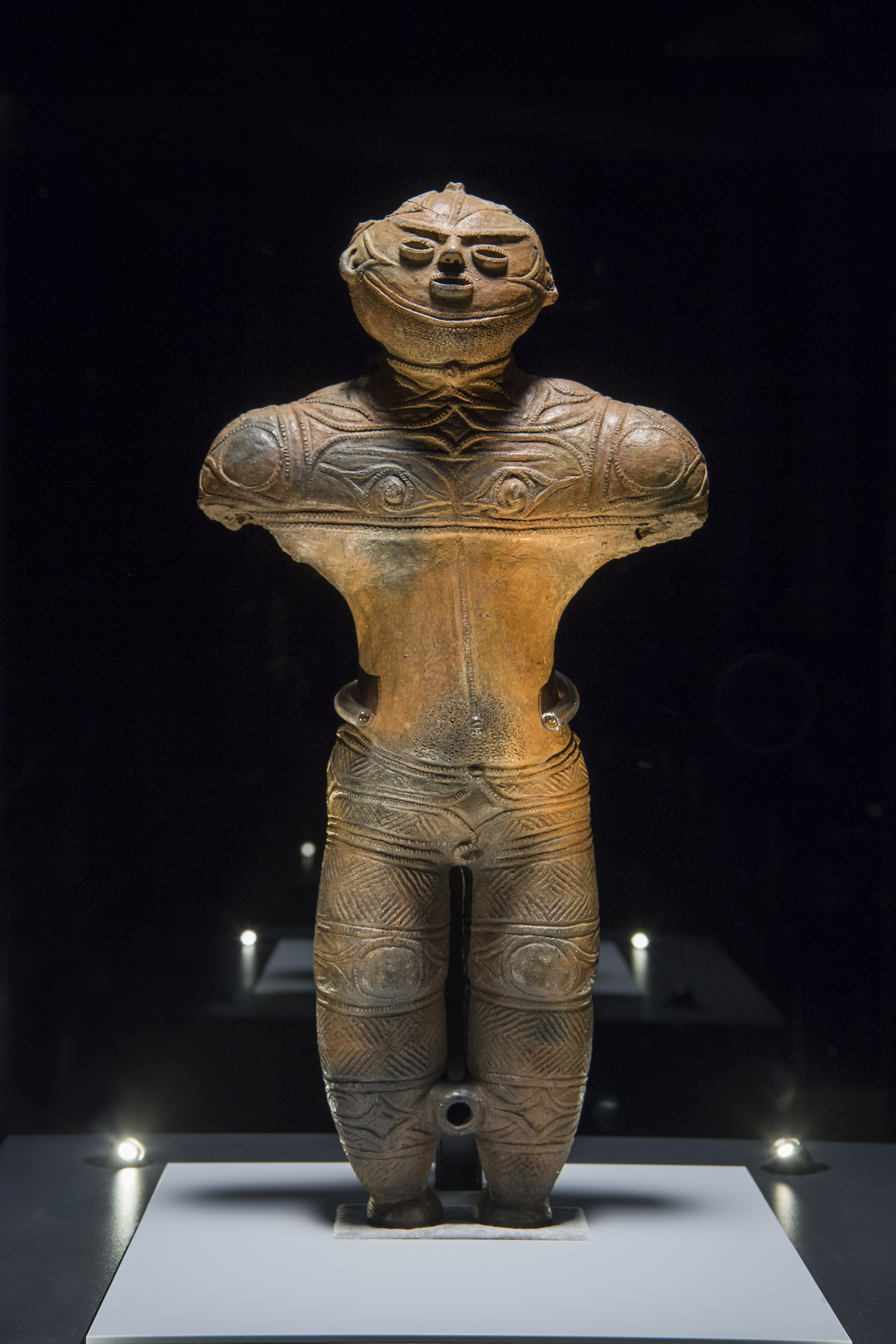
- Material: Clay
- Height: 41.5 cm
- Width: 20.1 cm
- Created: c. 1400 BC
- Discovered: August 1975; Hakodate, Hokkaido, Japan
- Present location: Hakodate, Hokkaido, Japan

The Hollow Dogū (中空土偶, chūkū dogū) is a Japanese dogū or clay figurine of the Late Jōmon period (c. 1500–1300 BC). A chance find from what was to become the Chobonaino Site in Hakodate, Hokkaido, it is exhibited at the Hakodate Jōmon Culture Center. It is one of five dogū that have been designated National Treasures. The other four include "Dogū with palms pressed together" from Aomori Prefecture, "Jōmon Goddess" from Yamagata Prefecture, and "Jōmon Venus" and "Masked Goddess" from Nagano Prefecture. It is also the first and, to date, only National Treasure in Hokkaidō.

== Chobonaino Site ==
The dogū was unearthed in a field overlooking the Pacific Ocean on the east coast of the Oshima Peninsula in August 1975, by a housewife turning over the soil with a hoe to harvest potatoes. To provide contextual information, a trench was opened and a Late Jōmon pit burial identified, complete with a jade pendant and fragments of a lacquered hairpin. In 2006, more detailed investigations were carried out over a wider area, uncovering further grave pits, refuse pits, lithics, and ceramics, as a well as a stone circle. On a terrace above Chobonaino, excavation of the Late Jōmon Makō B Site (磨光Ｂ遺跡) has uncovered a series of contemporary pit dwellings.

== Description ==
The figurine measures 41.5 cm (16.3 in) in height and 20.1 cm (7.9 in) in width, and weighs 1,745 g (61.6 oz). Approximately a quarter the size of a human adult, it is the largest of its kind. Other than its missing arms and a hole either side of the top of the head, the dogū is very well preserved.

Over most of its surface, the figurine is covered with decoration of three kinds: ribbed bands, cord imprints, and circular impressions. Although one theory sees the figure as female, with well-defined nipples, a slightly swollen patterned belly indicating pregnancy, and linea nigra-like decoration running down her chest, the figure is generally viewed as male, with a stippled beard running from ear to ear and covering his chin and neck, and a hirsute lower abdomen. The "discord" in the "gender traits" may even "give the impression of a figure intended to transcend gender".

The face is tilted slightly upwards and to the left, while the small protuberance on the top of the head may be a chignon. The single, continuous eyebrow, nose, and ears are defined by appliqué strips of clay. Beneath the mouth, two ribbed lines mark the transition from smooth skin to beard, while the beard is bounded below by a neck ring. Further ribbed strips of clay were applied to the back of the head, perhaps a fabric head-covering, upper chest and back, a cutoff top leaving the midriff bare, and legs, which are covered with a trouser-like garment, divided into horizontal fields, with flamboyant patterning. The knees are slightly bent, while between the lower legs there is a cross-piece with an opening. Traces of black lacquer on the beard and black and red pigment on the legs and elsewhere suggest that the figurine may once have been painted red and black all over.

Researchers from the Hakodate City Museum took the dogū to the municipal hospital for CT scanning, which helped cast light on the method of construction and on the interior, beyond what could be ascertained by shining a torch through the holes where the arms would be and on the top of the head. The torso is formed from slabs of clay, very thin on the back, with tubes of clay for the legs, and a finger-moulded head. The opening in the ornament between the legs connects with the rest of the hollow interior, and this has given rise to a number of different interpretations: it may have been inspired by contemporary pots with human figurative decoration and a spout where the foot would be; it may have been used in a funeral ritual relating to the burial context in which the figurine was found, the liquid-filled dogū being tipped up by the officiant and its contents poured over the body of the deceased and into the open mouths of the celebrants; it may have been filled with smoke or some other aetherial vapour; or it may simply and solely have been a device that functioned to improve the circulation of air during firing, a similar technique being used later in the firing of haniwa.

== Recent history ==
Discovered in 1975, the figurine was designated an Important Cultural Property in 1979. Since there was no suitable facility for display in the town of Minamikayabe (南茅部町) where the dogū was discovered (now merged into Hakodate), the figurine was kept in a paulownia box nested within a safety deposit box in the vault of Minamikayabe Town Hall for thirty years, before more recent valorization. This has included an appeal for suggestions for a nickname, Kakkū (茅空) being chosen, a portmanteau combining the 茅 of Minamikayabe with the 空 of hollow, the winning submission being awarded a year's supply of ma-konbu. Designated a National Treasure in 2007, the following year the figurine was specially exhibited at the 34th G8 summit, in a display case in the hotel in Tōyako that provided the venue: the environment and climate change were one of the principal items on the agenda, and it was thought appropriate for there to be "a representative of the Jomon people who lived in harmony with nature". Subsequent exhibitions in which the figurine has featured include The Power of Dogu, at the British Museum in 2009, Dogū, a Cosmos, at the Miho Museum in 2012, and Jomon: 10,000 Years of Prehistoric Art in Japan, at Tokyo National Museum in 2018. Hollow Dogū is now housed in room four of the Hakodate Jōmon Culture Center, with lighting that evokes that of the moon and the environment of the Jōmon period.

== See also ==
- List of National Treasures of Japan (archaeological materials)
- List of Cultural Properties of Japan – archaeological materials (Hokkaidō)
- List of Historic Sites of Japan (Hokkaidō)
- Dogū with palms pressed together
- Jōmon Venus
