= Jōmon Prehistoric Sites in Northern Japan =

UNESCO World Heritage Site
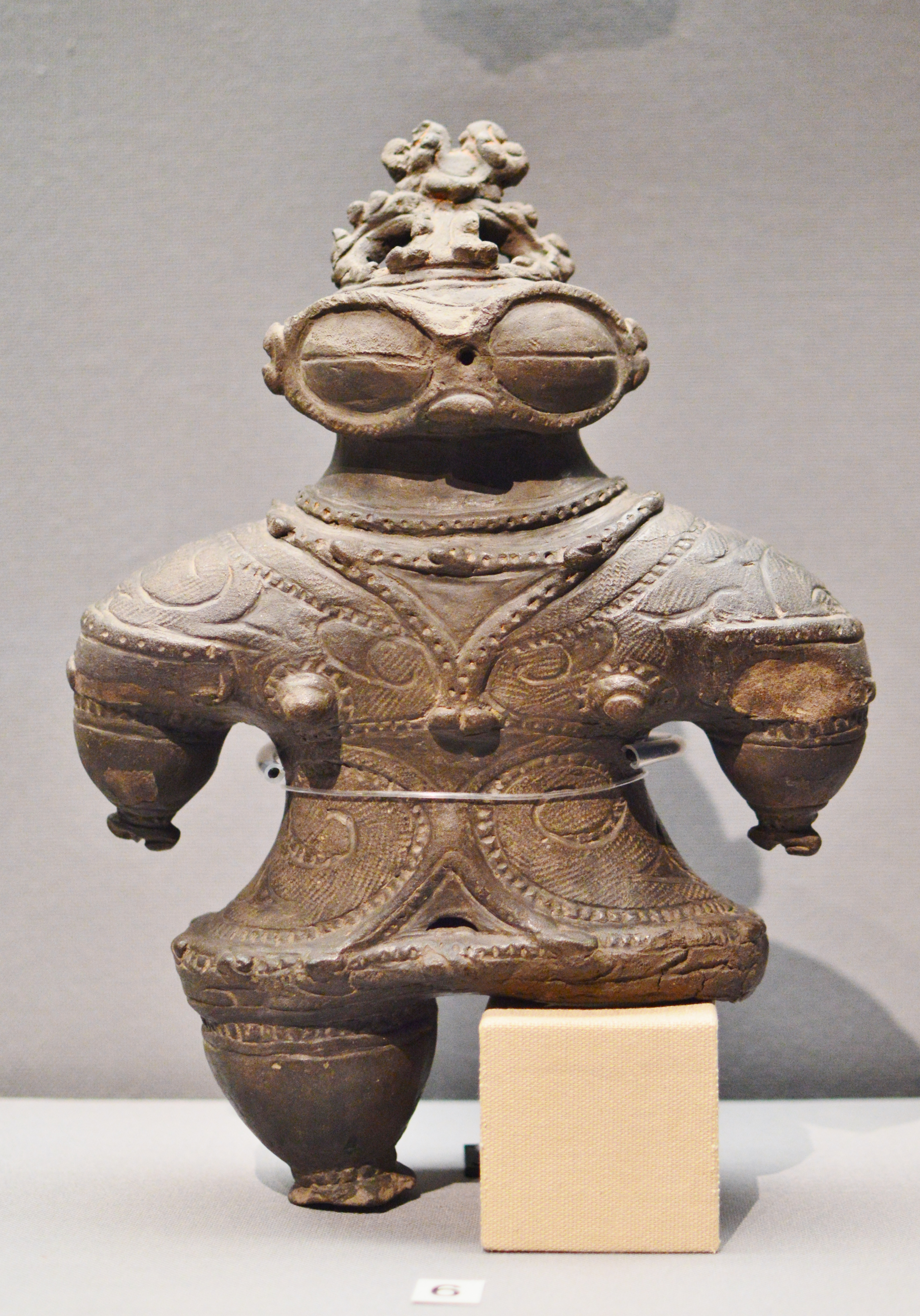
- Dogū excavated at Kamegaoka (ICP), now at Tokyo National Museum
- Interactive map of Jōmon Prehistoric Sites in Northern Japan
- Location: Japan
- Criteria: Cultural: (iii)(v)
- Reference: 1632
- Inscription: 2021 (44th Session)
- Area: 141.9 ha (0.548 sq mi)
- Buffer zone: 984.8 ha (3.802 sq mi)

Jōmon Prehistoric Sites in Northern Japan (北海道・北東北の縄文遺跡群) is a serial UNESCO World Heritage Site consisting of 17 Jōmon-period archaeological sites in Hokkaidō and northern Tōhoku, Japan. The Jōmon period lasted more than 10,000 years, representing "sedentary pre-agricultural lifeways and a complex spiritual culture of prehistoric people".

It was first placed on the World Heritage Tentative List in 2009. In 2021, ICOMOS recommended the inscription in July of the revised serial nomination of seventeen sites under criteria iii and v. It was then officially inscribed on the World Heritage List on 27 July 2021.

== Sites ==
All component sites have been designated for protection under the Law for the Protection of Cultural Properties, as Historic Sites or *Special Historic Sites ("ACA" column below).

UNESCO ID	Site	Municipality	Prefecture	Comments	Image	Coordinates	ACA
1632-001	Ōdai Yamamoto I Site 大平山元遺跡; Ōdai Yamamoto iseki	Sotogahama	Aomori	excavated earthenware has been dated as early as 16500 BP		41°04′02″N 140°33′18″E	
1632-002	Kakinoshima site 垣ノ島遺跡; Kakinoshima iseki	Hakodate	Hokkaidō	cf. nearby Hakodate Jōmon Culture Center and Hollow Dogū (National Treasure)		41°55′44″N 140°56′51″E	
1632-003	Kitakogane Shell Mound 北黄金貝塚; Kitakogane kaizuka	Date	Hokkaidō			42°24′07″N 140°54′38″E	
1632-004	Tagoyano site 田小屋野貝塚; Tagoyano kaizuka	Tsugaru	Aomori			40°53′17″N 140°20′21″E	
1632-005	Kamegaoka Burial Site 亀ヶ岡石器時代遺跡; Kamegaoka sekki-jidai iseki	Tsugaru	Aomori			40°53′06″N 140°20′22″E	
1632-006	Futatsumori Site 二ツ森貝塚; Futatsumori kaizuka	Shichinohe	Aomori			40°44′54″N 141°13′47″E	
1632-007	*Sannai Maruyama Site 三内丸山遺跡; Sannai-Maruyama iseki	Aomori	Aomori	Special Historic Site with associated ICP excavated artefacts		40°48′40″N 140°41′55″E	
1632-008	Ōfune Site 大船遺跡; Ōfune iseki	Hakodate	Hokkaidō			41°57′29″N 140°55′27″E	
1632-009	Goshono site 御所野遺跡; Goshono iseki	Ichinohe	Iwate			40°11′53″N 141°18′23″E	
1632-010	Irie site 入江貝塚; Irie kaizuka	Tōyako	Hokkaidō			42°32′50″N 140°46′13″E	
1632-011	Takasago Burial Site 高砂貝塚; Takasago kaizuka	Tōyako	Hokkaidō			42°32′50″N 140°46′13″E	
1632-012	Komakino Stone Circle 小牧野遺跡; Komakino iseki	Aomori	Aomori			40°44′19″N 140°43′43″E	
1632-013	Isedōtai Stone Circles 伊勢堂岱遺跡; Isedōtai iseki	Kita-Akita	Akita			40°12′05″N 140°20′54″E	
1632-014	*Ōyu Stone Circles 大湯環状列石; Ōyu kanjōresseki	Kazuno	Akita	Special Historic Site		40°16′17″N 140°48′16″E	
1632-015	Kiusu Earthwork Burial Circles キウス周堤墓群; Kiusu shūteibo-gun	Chitose	Hokkaidō			42°53′09″N 141°42′59″E	
1632-016	Ōmori Katsuyama Stone Circle 大森勝山遺跡; Ōmori Katsuyama iseki	Hirosaki	Aomori			40°41′56″N 140°21′30″E	
1632-017	Korekawa Site 是川石器時代遺跡; Korekawa sekki-jidai iseki	Hachinohe	Aomori	ICP excavated artefacts at Korekawa Jōmon Kan		40°28′25″N 141°29′28″E	

== See also ==
- List of National Treasures of Japan (archaeological materials)
- List of Historic Sites of Japan (Hokkaidō)
- List of Historic Sites of Japan (Aomori)
- List of Historic Sites of Japan (Iwate)
- List of Historic Sites of Japan (Akita)
- World Heritage Sites in Japan
