= Togariishi Museum of Jōmon Archaeology =

Museum in Chino, Nagano Prefecture, Japan

- 茅野市尖石縄文考古館
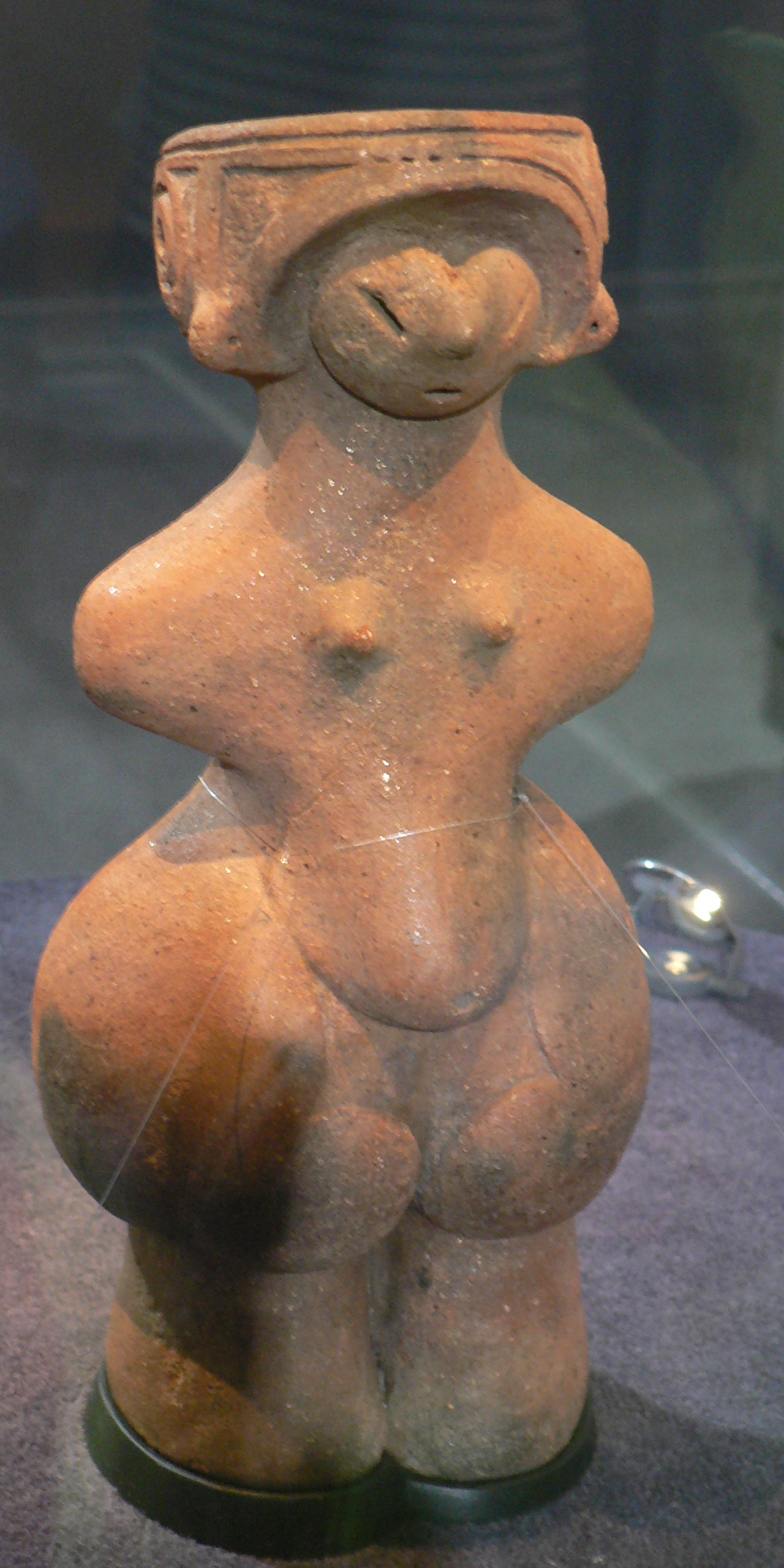
- Jōmon Venus (NT)

- Location within Nagano Prefecture Location within Japan
- Established: July 2000
- Location: 4734-132 Toyohira, Chino, Nagano-ken, Japan
- Coordinates: 36°00′49″N 138°14′01″E
- Website: Official website
- Special National Historic Site of Japan

Togariishi ruins

The Togariishi Museum of Jōmon Archaeology (茅野市尖石縄文考古館, Chino-shi Togariishi Jōmon Kōkokan) is a municipal museum located in the city of Chino, Nagano Prefecture, Japan, specializing in artifacts of the Jōmon period (between 14,000 and 1000 BCE).

== Togariishi Museum of Jōmon Archaeology ==
The museum was opened in July 2000. Its collection includes over two thousand artifacts includes two Jōmon period dogū that have been designated National Treasures, the "Jōmon Venus" and the "Masked Goddess".

== The Togariishi stone age ruins ==
The Togariishi stone age ruins (尖石石器時代遺跡, Togariishi sekki jidai iseki) is an archaeological site containing the ruins of a large scale Jōmon period settlement located in the Toyohira neighborhood of the city of Chino, Nagano. It was one of the first Jōmon period settlements found in Japan. The site was designated a National Historic Site of Japan in 1942 and a Special National Historic Site in 1952. Despite the designation “Stone Age” in its name, the site has no connection with the Japanese Paleolithic period.

The site is located on along plateau at the foot of Mount Yatsugatake at an elevation of 1000 meters. The area around Mount Yatsugatake has a very high concentration of Jōmon period ruins, partly because of abundant spring water and over 50 mid-Jōmon sites have been identified in the near vicinity of the Togariishi site. Although the ruins were known since the Meiji period, they were first excavated by the archaeologist Hidekazu Miyasaka in 1929. At that time, the foundations of 33 pit dwellings arranged in a U-shape around a central plaza were discovered, along with numerous artifacts, including Jōmon pottery, stone tools, jewelry and obsidian tools. The site was approximately 170 meters from east-to-west by 90 meters from north-to-south. In addition to the pit dwelling traces, 53 hearth sites, rows of standing stones, clay figurines, storage pits and grave sites were found. This was the first confirmed example of a complete settlement from the Jōmon period, and was thus the forerunner of the study of that period of Japanese history. Further postwar excavations have revealed that the site contains at least 220 residence sites, making it the largest settlement thus found in the vicinity of Mount Yatsugatake. The area covered by the Special Historical Site designation was expanded in 1993.

== See also ==
- List of National Treasures of Japan (archaeological materials)
- List of Historic Sites of Japan (Nagano)
- Jōmon pottery
