= Japanese Prehistoric Art =

Art of the Jōmon and Yayoi periods

Japanese prehistoric art is a wide-ranging category, spanning over the Jōmon (c. 10,000 BCE – 350 BCE) and Yayoi periods (c. 350 BCE – 250 CE), and the entire Japanese archipelago. Including Hokkaidō in the north, and the Ryukyu Islands in the south which were, politically, not part of Japan until the late 19th century.

Much about these two periods remains unknown, and debates continue among scholars regarding the nature of these cultures and societies of the period. Also including their number and the extent to which they can be considered to be united, uniform cultures across the archipelago, and across time.

== Jōmon art ==
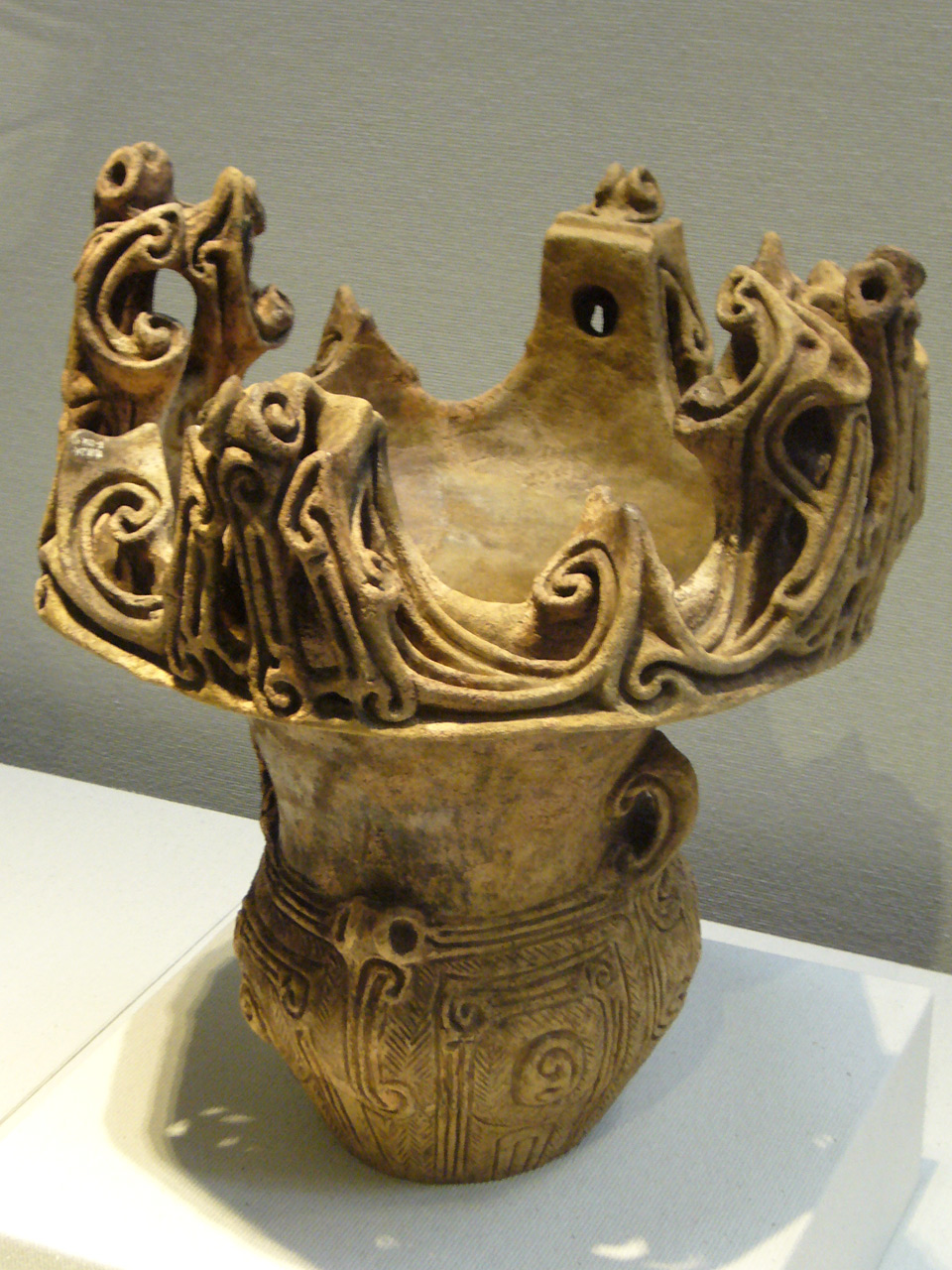
Middle Jōmon (3000–2000 BCE). "Crown formed vessel," a variation on the flame vessel style for which Jōmon art is famous.

The Jōmon people are generally said to have been the first settlers of Japan. Nomadic hunter-gatherers who later practiced organized farming and built cities, the Jōmon people are named for the "cord-markings", impressions made with rope, found as decorations on pottery of this time, a term which was first applied to the pottery, and the culture, by American Edward Sylvester Morse. Jōmon pottery is said by many scholars to be the oldest yet discovered in the world.

The Jōmon communities consisted of hundreds or even thousands of people, who dwelt in simple houses of wood and thatch set into shallow earthen pits to provide warmth from the soil. They crafted lavishly decorated pottery storage vessels, clay figurines called dogū, and crystal jewels.

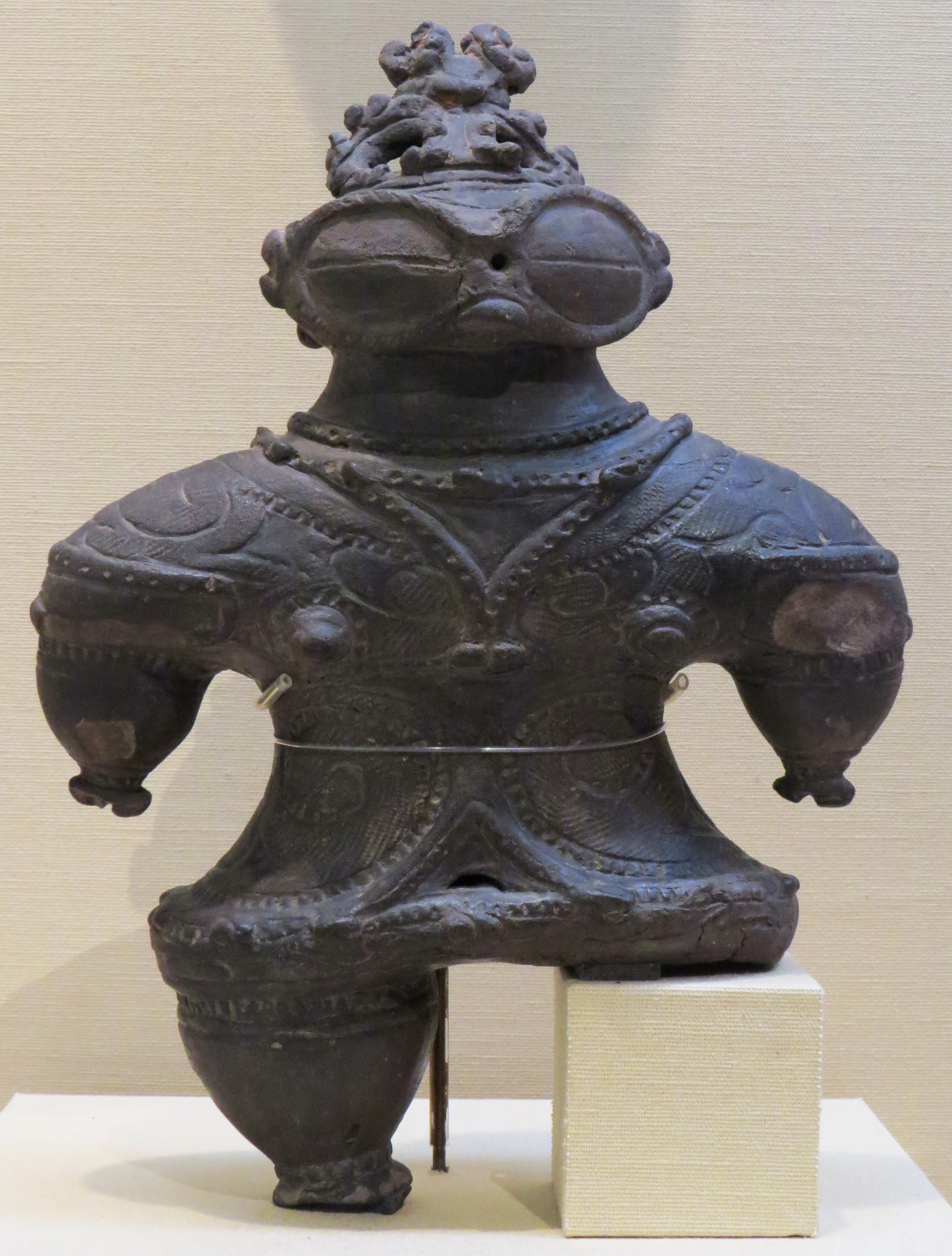
A Final Jōmon dogū statuette (1000–400 BCE), Tokyo National Museum.

The oldest examples of Jōmon pottery have flat bottoms, though pointed bottoms (meant to be held in small pits in the earth, like an amphora) became common later. In the Middle Jōmon period (3000-2000 BCE), simple decorations made with cord or through scratching gave way to highly elaborate designs. So-called flame vessels, along with the closely related crown-formed vessels, are among the most distinctive forms from this period; representative forms such as clay figurines of people and animals also appeared around this time. These figurines, called dogū, are often described as "goggle-eyed", and feature elaborate geometrical designs, and short, stubby limbs. Scholars speculate they had religious significance and were used in fertility and healing rituals.

== Yayoi art ==
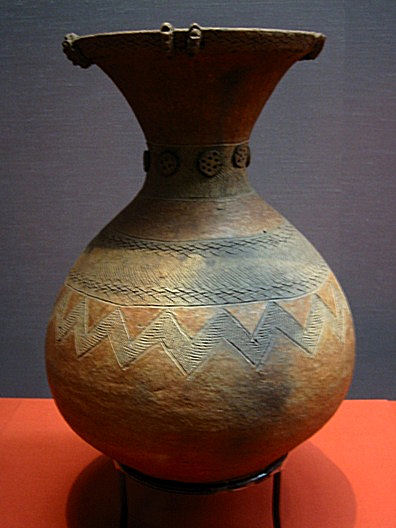
Yayoi jar, 1st-3rd century CE. Tokyo National Museum.

The next wave of immigrants was the Yayoi people, named for the district in Tokyo where remnants of their settlements first were found. These people, arriving in Japan about 350 BCE, brought their knowledge of wetland rice cultivation, the manufacture of copper weapons and bronze bells (dōtaku), and wheel-thrown, kiln-fired ceramics. Along with introducing bronze casting and other technologies into the islands, the Yayoi people, who are generally believed to have come from the continent, brought cultural influences from the southern part of China.

Chinese expansion under the Qin (221–206 BCE) and Han (206 BCE – 220 CE) dynasties is said to have been one of the primary impetuses for migrations to the Japanese archipelago, which brought with it cultural influences and new technologies. Artifacts brought to the islands at this time had a powerful effect on the development of Japanese art, by presenting objects to imitate and copy, such as bronze mirror,(Shinju-kyo) from Chinese mythology. The Yayoi people brought Japan into the Iron Age around the 3rd century CE.

Yayoi period pottery tends to be smoother than that of Jōmon, and more frequently features decorations made with sticks or combs, rather than rope.

== See also ==
- List of National Treasures of Japan (archaeological materials)

== References and notes ==
Preceded by –	Japanese art Japanese history Jōmon and Yayoi periods	Succeeded by Yamato period
