= Kiusu Earthwork Burial Circles =

- キウス周堤墓群 (Japanese)
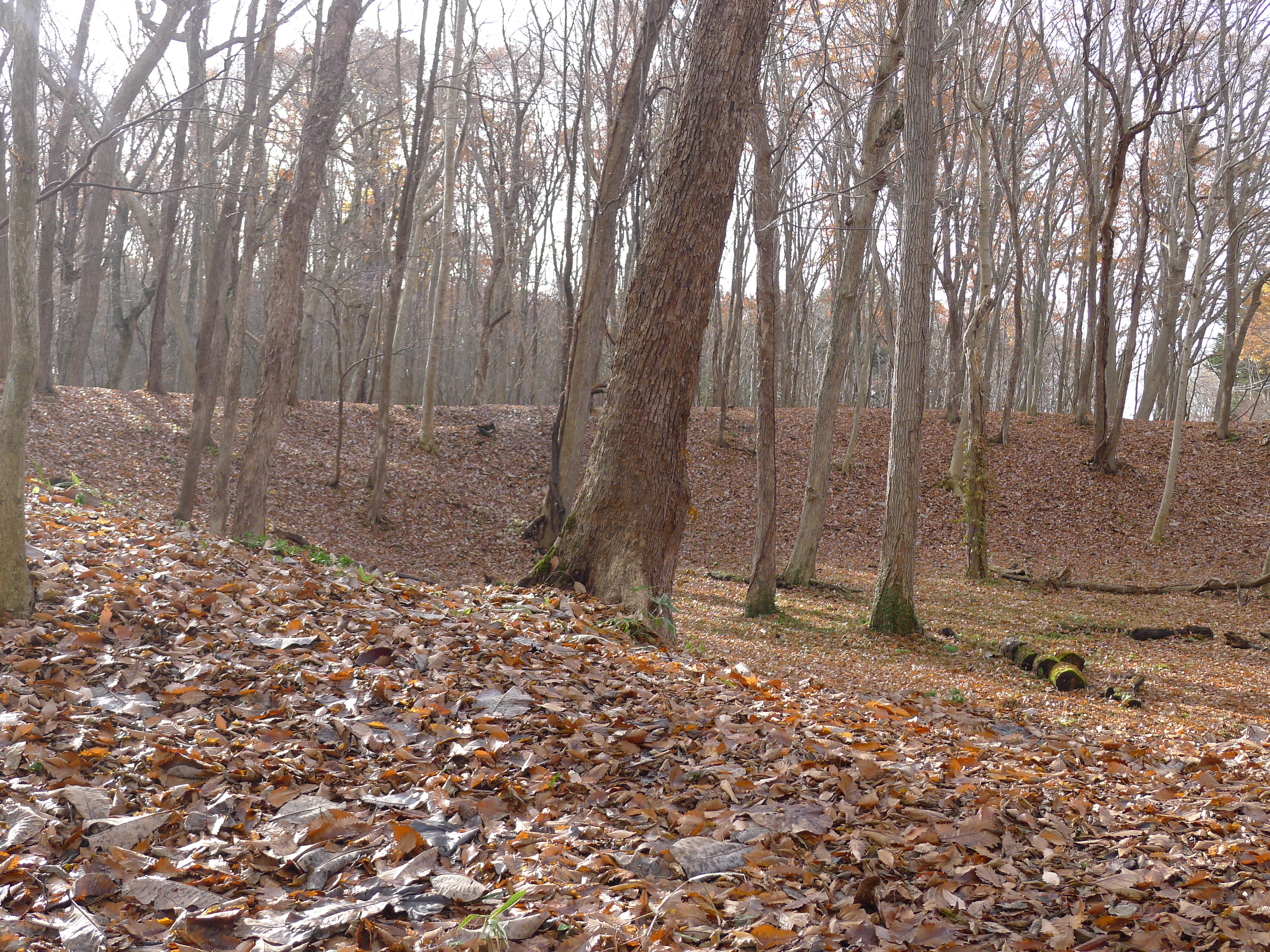
- Kiusu Earthwork Burial Circles

- Kiusu Earthwork Burial Circles Kiusu Earthwork Burial Circles (Japan)
- 42°53′8.0″N 141°42′58.0″E
- Type: burial mound cluster
- Periods: Jōmon
- Location: Chitose, Hokkaido, Japan
- Region: Hokkaido

Site notes
- Public access: Yes (no facilities at site)

UNESCO World Heritage Site
- Criteria: Cultural: iii, v
- Reference: 1632
- Inscription: 2021 (44th Session)
- National Historic Site of Japan

The Kiusu Earthwork Burial Circles (キウス周堤墓群, Kiusu shūtei bogun) is an archaeological site with multiple burial mounds believed to have been constructed during the late Jōmon period (approximately 3200 years ago) located in the city of Chitose, Hokkaidō, Japan. The site was designated a National Historic Site in 1979. It became a component of UNESCO World Heritage Site Jōmon Prehistoric Sites in Northern Japan on 27 July 2021.

== Overview ==
The Kiusu burial mounds are located on a gentle slope from the Yufutsu Plain to the Ishikari Plain in central Hokkaido, and on the western side of the Maoi Hills. There are 14 circular embankments located on the south and north banks of a small river flowing from the eastern hills into Osatsu Marsh, and within a 3 kilometer radius to the southwest. The tumuli are called a "circular embankment burial mounds" because the earth is piled up in a donut shape, and the graves are constructed in the central depression. The outer diameter ranges from 18 to 75 meters, and the embankment width is several meters to 20 meters. Ten of these embankments remain clearly visible. Within these embankments are burial pits containing parts of human remains and pottery fragments, and burial pits have also been discovered outside the embankments. Pottery and stone rods dating from the late to early final Jōmon period have been unearthed. While there are many such sites in Hokkaidō, the Kiusu Circular Embankment Burial Mounds are the largest site with the greatest number of embankments. It also shares similarities with other circular stone arrangements and pit burials remaining in Hokkaidō. The site came to the attention of academia in 1924 when it was described as a chashi fortification. It was not until after archaeological excavations in the 1960s and 1970s, and especially in 1977 in conjunction with the construction of New Chitose International Airport that it was recognized a cluster of burial mounds. Excavated artifacts include pottery and wooden objects, which are preserved and can be viewed at the Hokkaido Prefectural Buried Cultural Properties Center in Ebetsu.

The site is approximately a 15-minute walk from Chitose Station on the JR Hokkaido Chitose Line.

== See also ==
- List of Historic Sites of Japan (Hokkaidō)
