= Hakodate Jōmon Culture Center =

- 函館市縄文文化交流センター
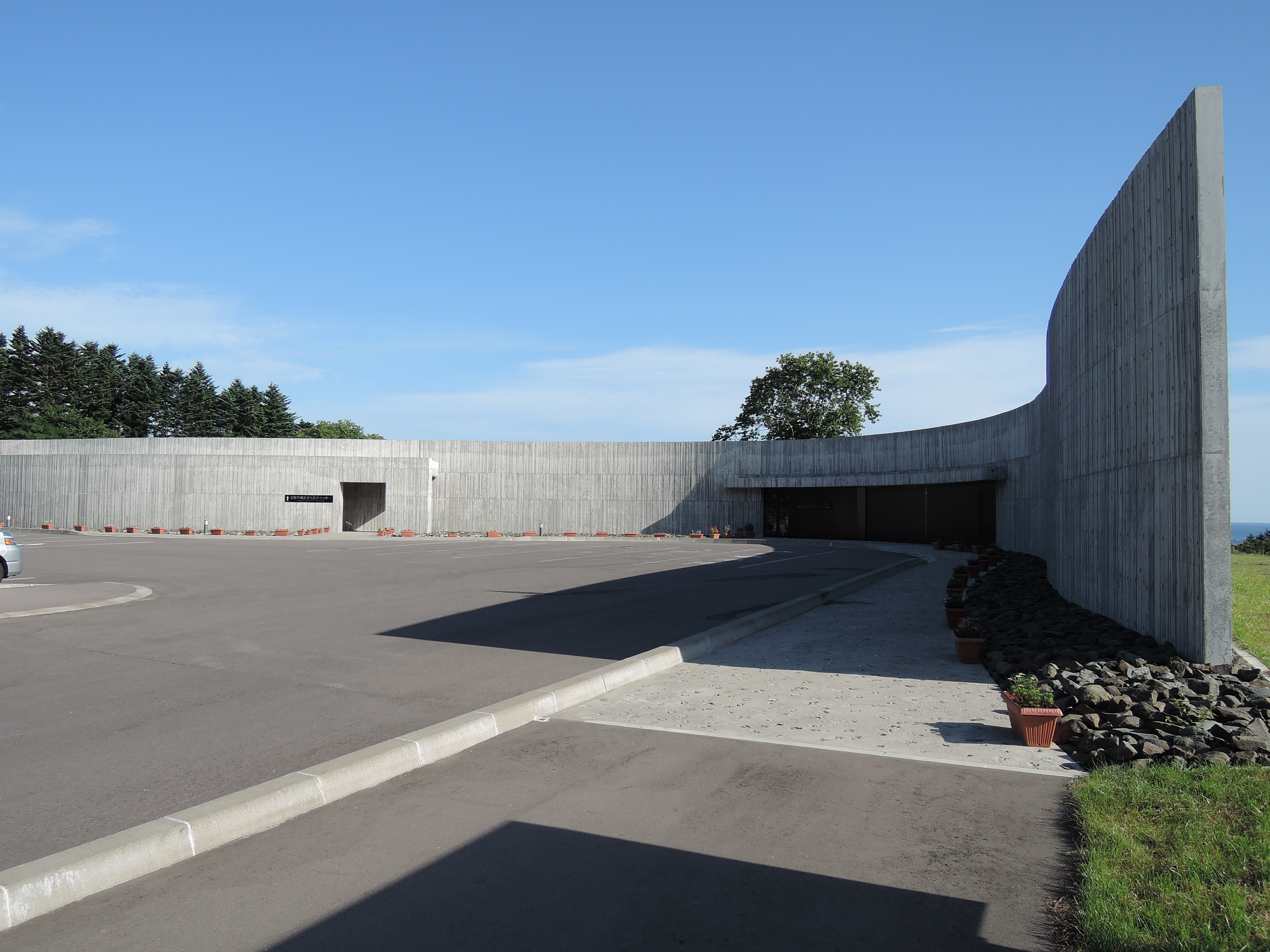
- Interactive map of the Hakodate Jōmon Culture Center area

General information
- Location: 551-1 Usujiri-chō, Hakodate, Hokkaidō, Japan
- Coordinates: 41°55′40″N 140°56′42″E
- Opened: 1 October 2011

Website
- Official website

Hakodate Jōmon Culture Center (函館市縄文文化交流センター, Hakodate Jōmon Bunka Kōryū Senta—) is a history museum in Hakodate, Hokkaidō, Japan, opened in 2011. It has four exhibition rooms dedicated to the Jōmon period, displaying some 1,200 pieces of earthenware and stoneware excavated in Hakodate as well as the only National Treasure in Hokkaidō, the so-called "Hollow Dogū", excavated from the Chobonaino Site (著保内野遺跡) (designated in 2007). Hands-on activities, including magatama-making and "angin (編布)-knitting", are also available. The museum is located at Michi no Eki Jōmon Roman Minamikayabe (道の駅縄文ロマン 南かやべ), making this the only roadside station in Japan with a museum with a National Treasure.

== Gallery ==
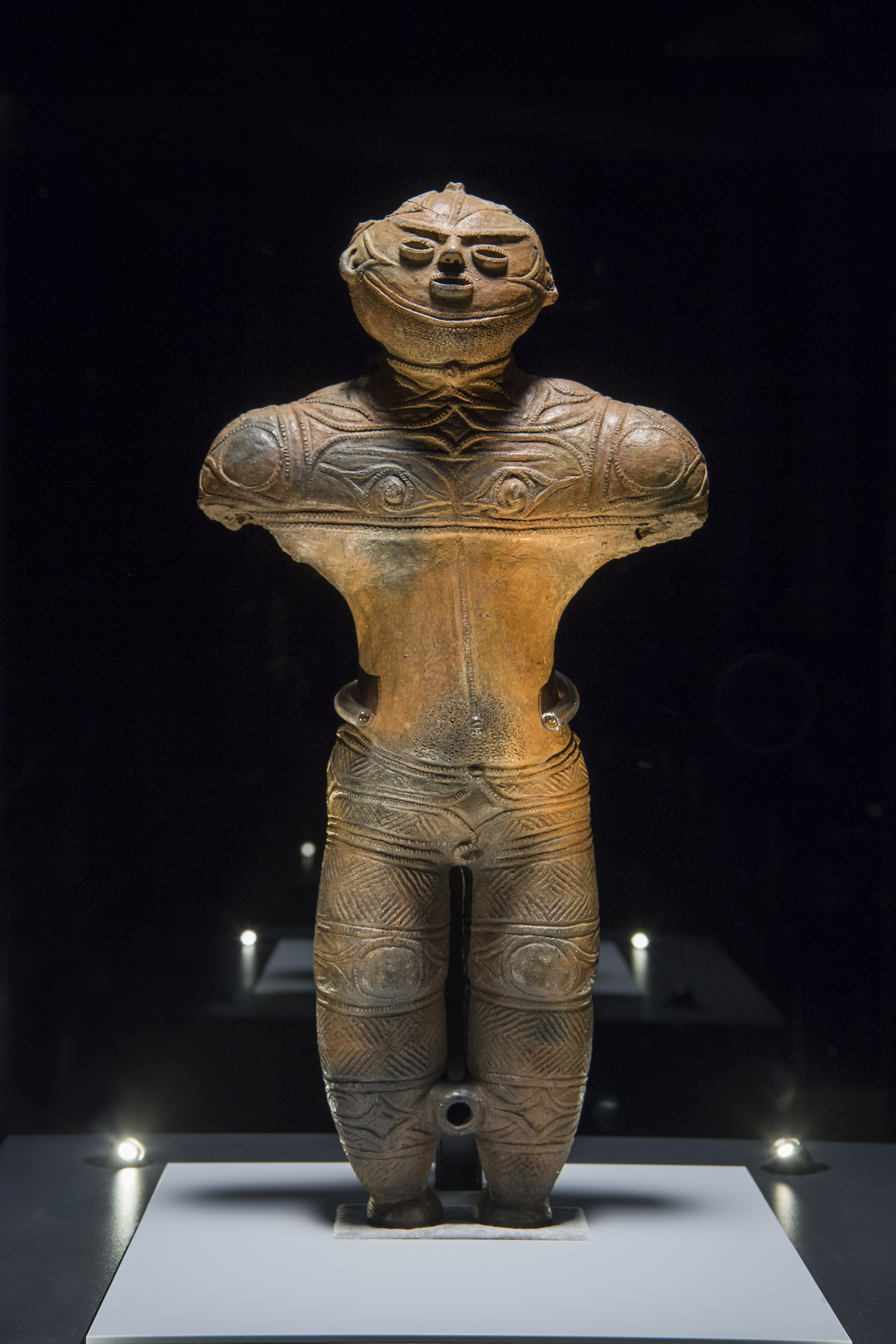
Dogū (NT)

== See also ==
- Jōmon Archaeological Sites in Hokkaidō, Northern Tōhoku, and other regions
- Hakodate City Museum
