= Jōmon Venus =

Female dogū figurine from the Middle Jōmon period

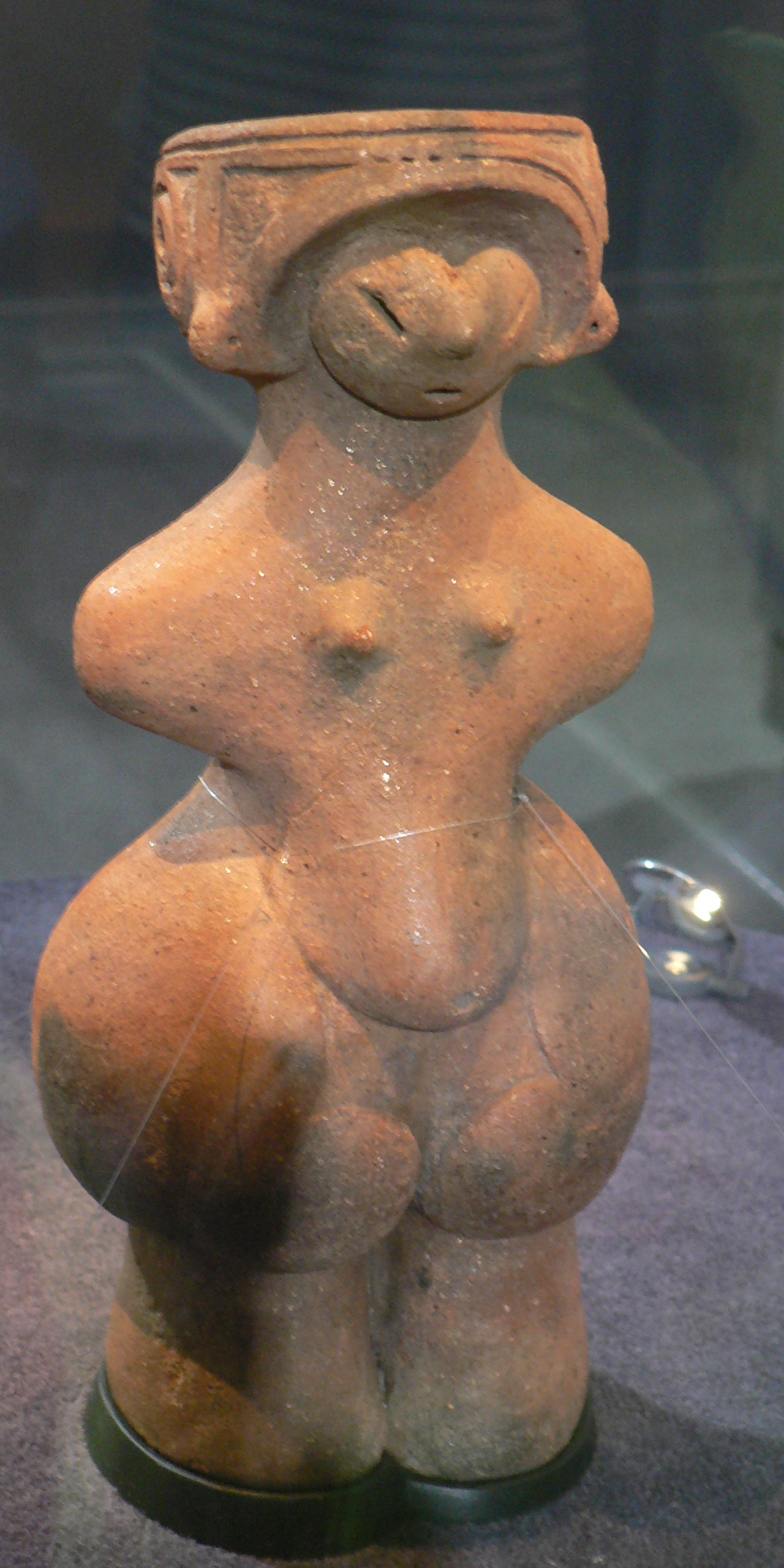
- Jōmon Venus
- Material: Clay
- Height: 27 cm (11 in)
- Weight: 2.14 kg (4.7 lb)
- Created: c. 2500 BC
- Period/culture: Middle Jōmon period
- Discovered: 1986; Chino, Nagano, Japan
- Present location: Togariishi Museum of Jōmon Archaeology, Chino, Nagano, Japan

The Jōmon Venus (縄文のビーナス, Jōmon no Bīnasu) is a dogū, a humanoid clay female figurine from the Middle Jōmon period (c. 2500 BC), discovered in 1986 in Chino, Nagano Prefecture, Japan. It was designated a National Treasure in 1995, the first Jōmon-period artifact to be so designated.

The dogū is an ocher-colored clay statuette 27 cm (11 in) high and weighing 2.14 kg (4.7 lb). The clay from which it is made has been carefully polished and contains mica. Its shape is thought to resemble a pregnant woman: broad hips, a pronounced gluteal arch, prominent breasts and an enlarged belly. In contrast to the overwhelming majority of the 20,000 dogū found in Japan, which were fragmented, the Venus of Jōmon is complete and has all its limbs.

== History ==
In 1986, archaeological excavations were organized before the construction of an industrial park in the town of Chino at the site of the former hamlet of Tanabatake, located at the foot of the southern slope of Mount Kirigamine in the Yatsugatake Mountains, about 140 km (87 mi) northwest of Tokyo. This Tanabatake archaeological site (棚畑遺跡, Tanabateke Iseki) revealed the vestiges of a village of 149 houses, 146 of which date from the middle Jōmon period. The pieces of obsidian discovered at the site indicate that this village was a prosperous trading center. The figurine was found among the burial pits at the center of the excavation site. It was first named the Tanabatake Venus before acquiring its present name.

In 1989, it was designated an Important Cultural Property before achieving its current status. It is exhibited at the Togariishi Museum of Jōmon Archaeology in Chino.

== See also ==
- List of National Treasures of Japan (archaeological materials)
- Japanese Prehistoric Art
- Masked Goddess
- Jōmon pottery
