= Jōmon-Ogata Station =

Railway station in Kitaakita, Akita Prefecture, Japan

Jōmon-Ogata Station 縄文小ヶ田駅
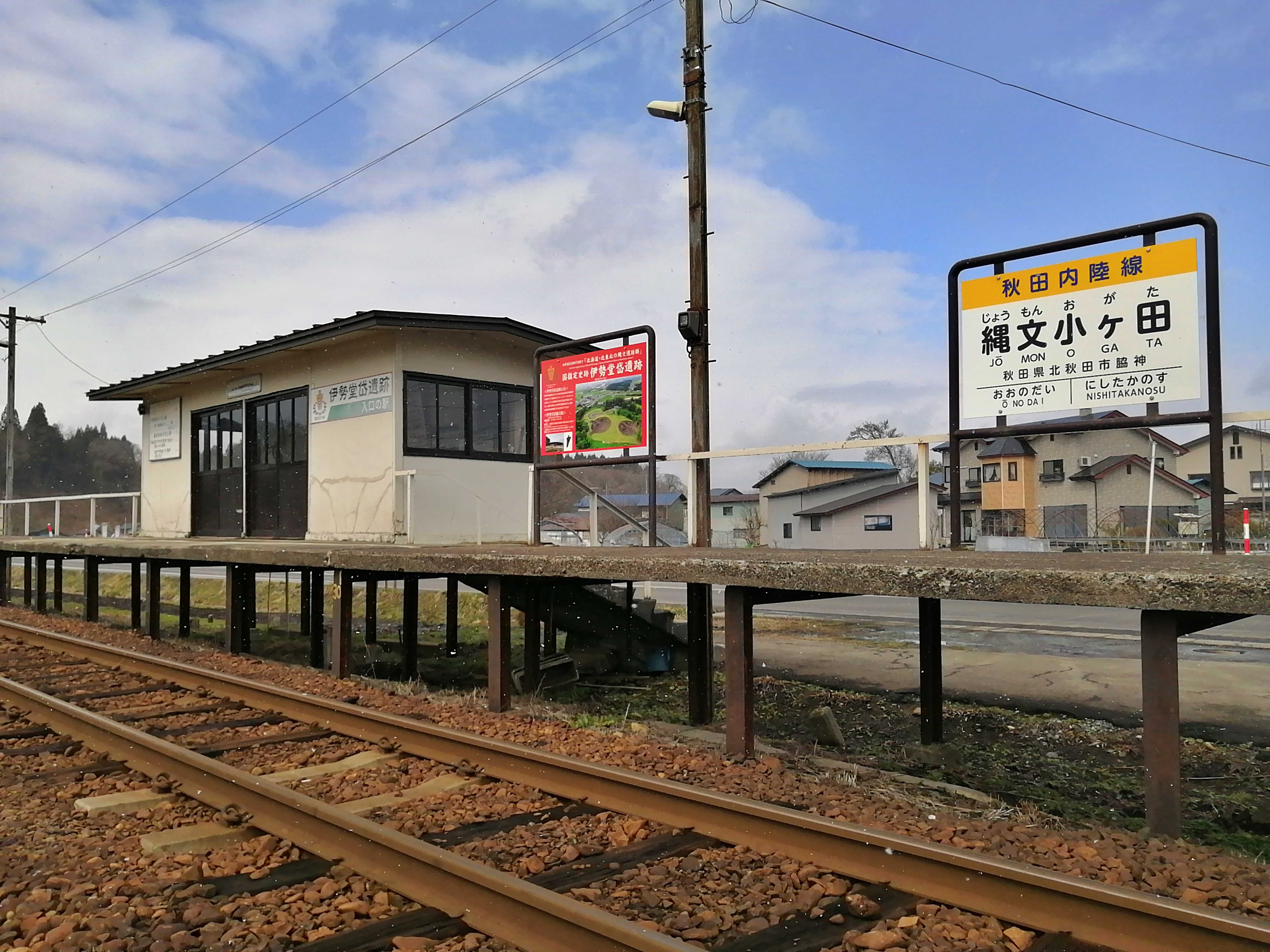
- Ogata Station, March 2020

General information
- Location: Ogatakakoinouchi Wakigami, Kitaakita-shi, Akita-ken 018-3454; Japan
- Coordinates: 40°12′17.90″N 140°20′57.13″E
- Operator: Akita Nariku Railway
- Line: ■ Nairiku Line
- Distance: 3.7 kilometers from Takanosu
- Platforms: 1 side platform

Other information
- Status: Unstaffed
- Website: Official website

History
- Opened: December 10, 1963

Passengers
- FY2016: 9
Location
- Location within Akita Prefecture Location within Japan

Jōmon-Ogata Station (縄文小ヶ田駅, Jōmon-Ogata-eki) is a railway station located in the city of Kitaakita, Akita Prefecture, Japan, operated by the third sector railway operator Akita Nairiku Jūkan Railway.

== Lines ==
Ogata Station is served by the Nariku Line, and is located 3.7 km from the terminus of the line at Takanosu Station.

== Station layout ==
The station consists of one side platform serving a single bi-directional track. The station is unattended.

== Adjacent stations ==
«	Service	»
Akita Nairiku Jūkan Railway Akita Nairiku Line
Rapid: Does not stop at this station
Nishi-Takanosu	-	Ōnodai

== History ==
Ogata Station(小ヶ田駅, Ogata-eki) opened on December 10, 1963 as a station on the Japan National Railways (JNR) serving the town of Takanosu, Akita. The line was extended on to Aniai Station by September 25, 1936. The line was privatized on November 1, 1986, becoming the Akita Nairiku Jūkan Railway. On March 14, 2020, the station was renamed to Jōmon-Ogata Station (縄文小ヶ田駅, Jōmon-Ogata-eki).

== Surrounding area ==
- Isedōtai Ruins
- Yoneshiro River
