= Korekawa Site =

Archaeological site in Hachinohe, Japan

- 是川遺跡 (Japanese)
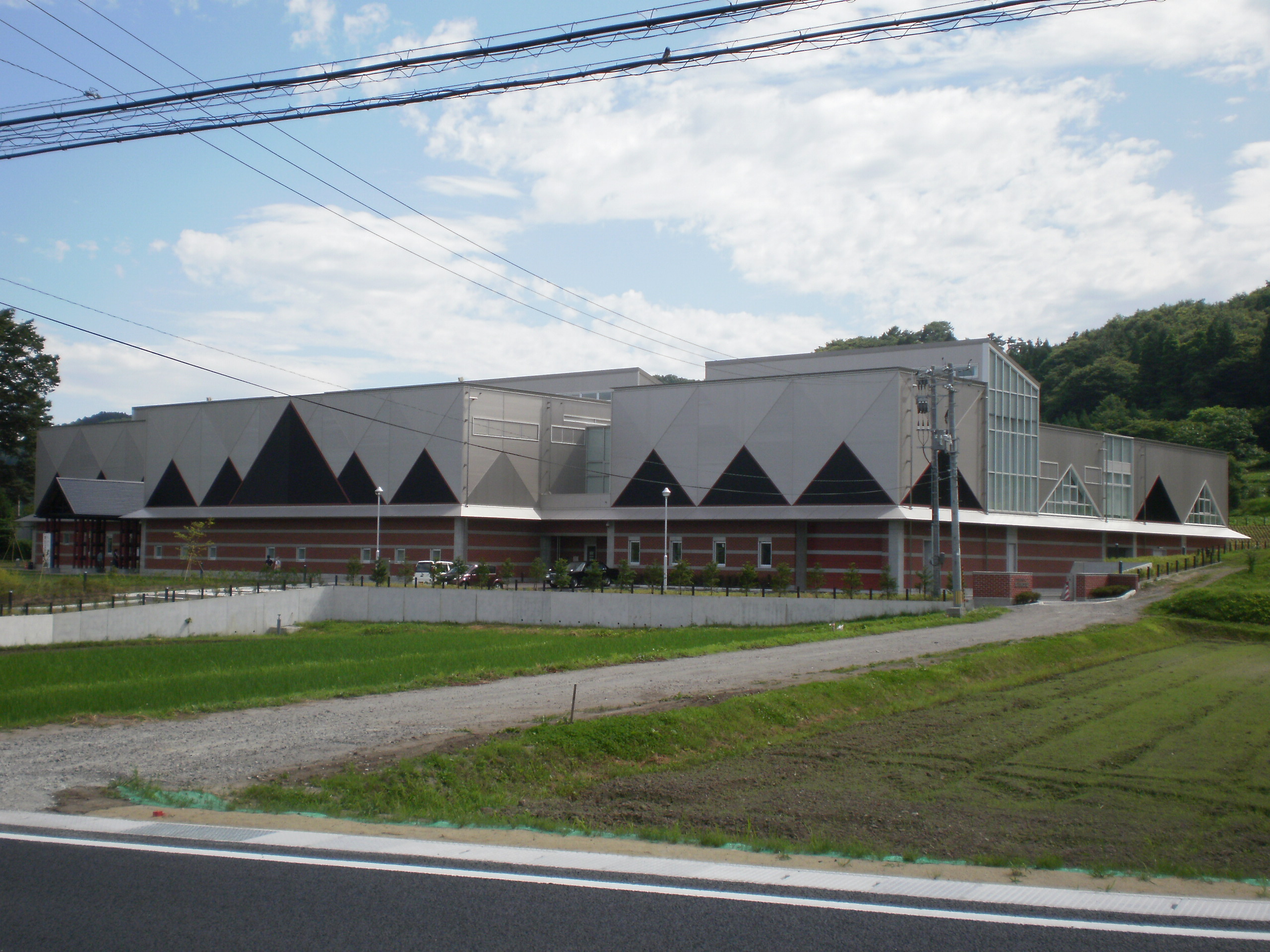
- Korekawa Jōmon Kan

- Korekawa Jōmon Kan Korekawa Site (Japan)
- 40°28′32″N 141°29′18.1″E
- Type: settlement, midden
- Periods: Jōmon period
- Location: Hachinohe, Aomori, Japan
- Region: Tōhoku region

History
- Built: 3000 BC to 300 BC

Site notes
- Excavation dates: 1962, 1999-2004
- Public access: Yes (Museum on site)

The Korekawa Site (是川遺跡, Korekawa iseki) is an archaeological site in the city of Hachinohe, Aomori Prefecture, in the Tōhoku region of northern Japan containing the ruins of a middle to late Jōmon period (3000-1000 BC) settlement. The remains were designated a National Historic Site in 1957 by the Japanese government. It is also referred to as the "Korekawa Stone Age site", although the remains discovered are from the Jōmon period, rather than the Japanese Paleolithic period.

== Overview ==
The site consists of three locations: the Ichioji Site (一王寺遺跡) (Early to Middle Jōmon period), Hotta Site (堀田遺跡) (Middle Jōmon period), and Nakai Site (中居遺跡) (Final Jōmon period), collectively called the Korekawa Site. The location is on a river terrace on the left bank of the Niida River, at an altitude of approximately 10 to 30 meters. The area was first excavated in the 1920s, and then much more extensively in 1962 and again from 1999 to 2004.

The size of the settlement during the middle to late Jōmon period (3000-1000 BC) was relatively small, but the site included the residential area, graveyard, work area, garbage midden and ritual place.

The garbage midden contained the remnants of various shellfish, bones of animals and fish and an extremely large number of Japanese horse chestnuts and walnuts, indicating the importance of these nuts in the Jōmon period diet. Of especial note were lacquerware items, both of decoration and for strengthening and preserving tools, which suggest systematic lacquer tool production activities.

The Nakai Site is also one of the type sites representing the Kamegaoka culture of the final phase of the Jōmon period (1000-300 BC).

Many of the artifacts recovered from the site are on display at the Hachinohe Archaeological Institution - Korekawa Jomon Kan (八戸市埋蔵文化財センター 是川縄文館), a museum built at the site, which has been preserved as an archaeological park with several reconstructed pit dwellings. In 2011, 330 items recovered from the site were designated as Important Cultural Properties by the Japanese government. One of the objects, a clay figurine depicting a seated man in a pose of prayer, has been designated a National Treasure of Japan.

The site has been submitted for inscription on the UNESCO World Heritage List as one of the Jōmon Archaeological Sites in Hokkaidō, Northern Tōhoku, and other regions

== See also ==
- List of Historic Sites of Japan (Aomori)
- Jōmon Archaeological Sites in Hokkaidō, Northern Tōhoku, and other regions
