= Dogū =

Type of figurine from prehistoric Japan

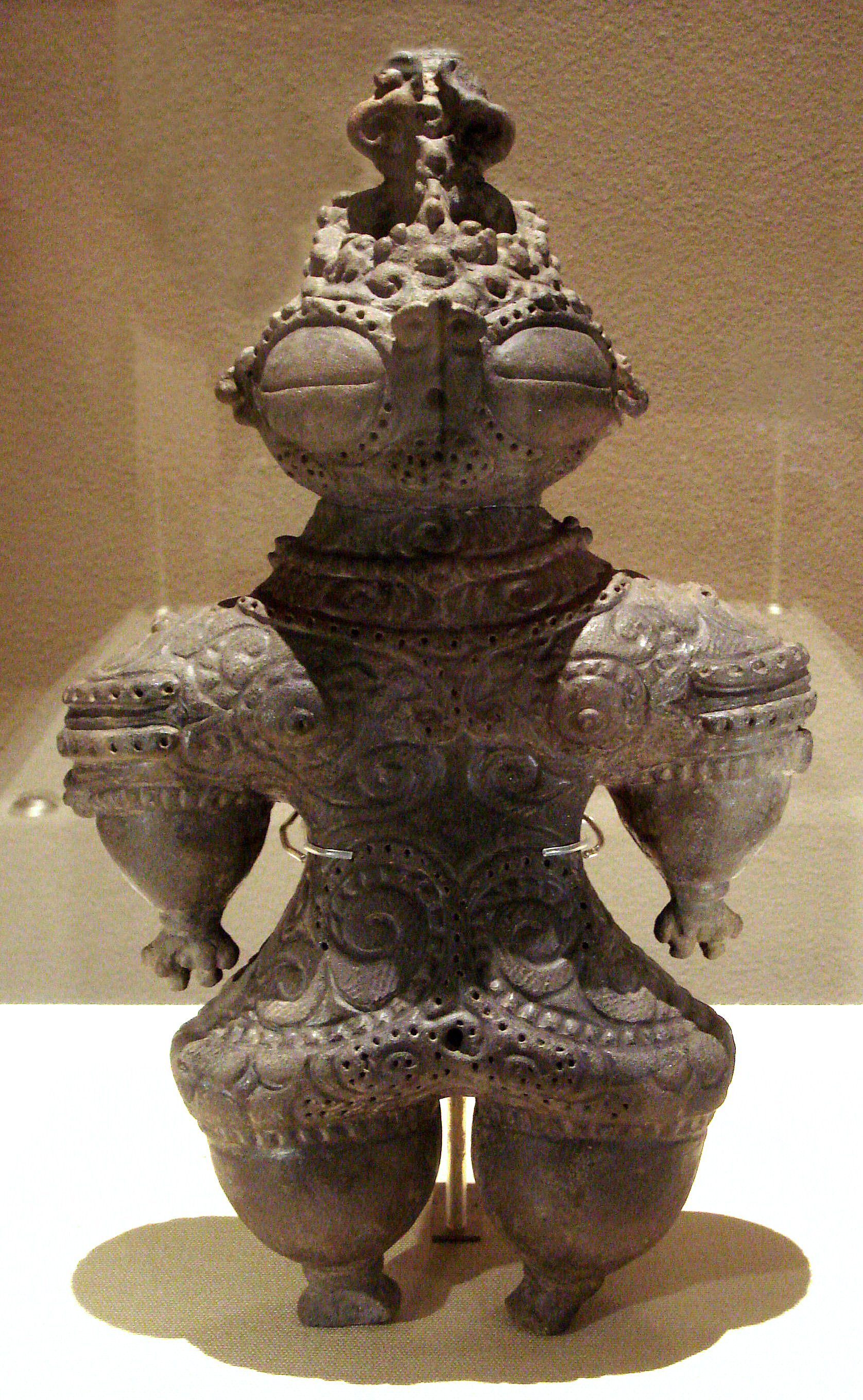
Dogū, Ebisuda site in Tajiri, Miyagi Prefecture, 1000–400 BCE.

Dogū (Japanese: 土偶; IPA: [do̞ɡɯ̟ː]; literally "earthen figure") are small humanoid and animal figurines made during the later part of the Jōmon period (14,000–400 BCE) of prehistoric Japan. (Note: In the Japanese language, dogū is a generic term for any humanoid figure made of clay. The clay figures of prehistoric Eastern Europe, such as the Pit–Comb Ware culture, are also referred to as dogū in Japanese.) Dogū come exclusively from the Jōmon period, and were no longer made by the following Yayoi period. There are various styles of dogū, depending on the exhumation area and time period.

The National Museum of Japanese History estimates that the total number of dogū is approximately 15,000, while The Japan Times places the figure at approximately 18,000. Dogū were made across all of Japan, except Okinawa. Most of the dogū have been found in eastern Japan and it is rare to find one in western Japan. The purpose of the dogū remains unknown and should not be confused with the clay haniwa funerary objects of the Kofun period (250 – 538 CE).

Everyday ceramic items from the period are called Jōmon pottery.

== Origins ==
Some scholars theorize the dogū acted as effigies of people, that manifested some kind of sympathetic magic. For example, it may have been thought that illnesses could be transferred into the dogū, which were then destroyed, clearing the illness, or any other misfortune.

== Characteristics ==
Dogū are made of clay and are small, typically 10 to 30 cm high. Most of the figurines appear to be modeled as female, and have big eyes, small waists, and wide hips. They are considered by many to be representative of goddesses. Many have large abdomens associated with pregnancy, suggesting that the Jomon considered them mother goddesses. According to the Metropolitan Museum of Art, these figurines "suggest an association with fertility and shamanistic rites".

The dogū tend to have large faces, small arms and hands and compact bodies. Some appear to wear goggles or have "heart-shaped" faces. Most have marks on the face, chest and shoulders, that suggest tattooing and probable incision with bamboo.

== Types ==
- "Heart-shaped (or crescent-shaped eyebrow)" figurine
- "Horned-owl type" figurine
- "Goggle-eyed type" (shakōkidogū) figurine
- "Pregnant woman type" figurine
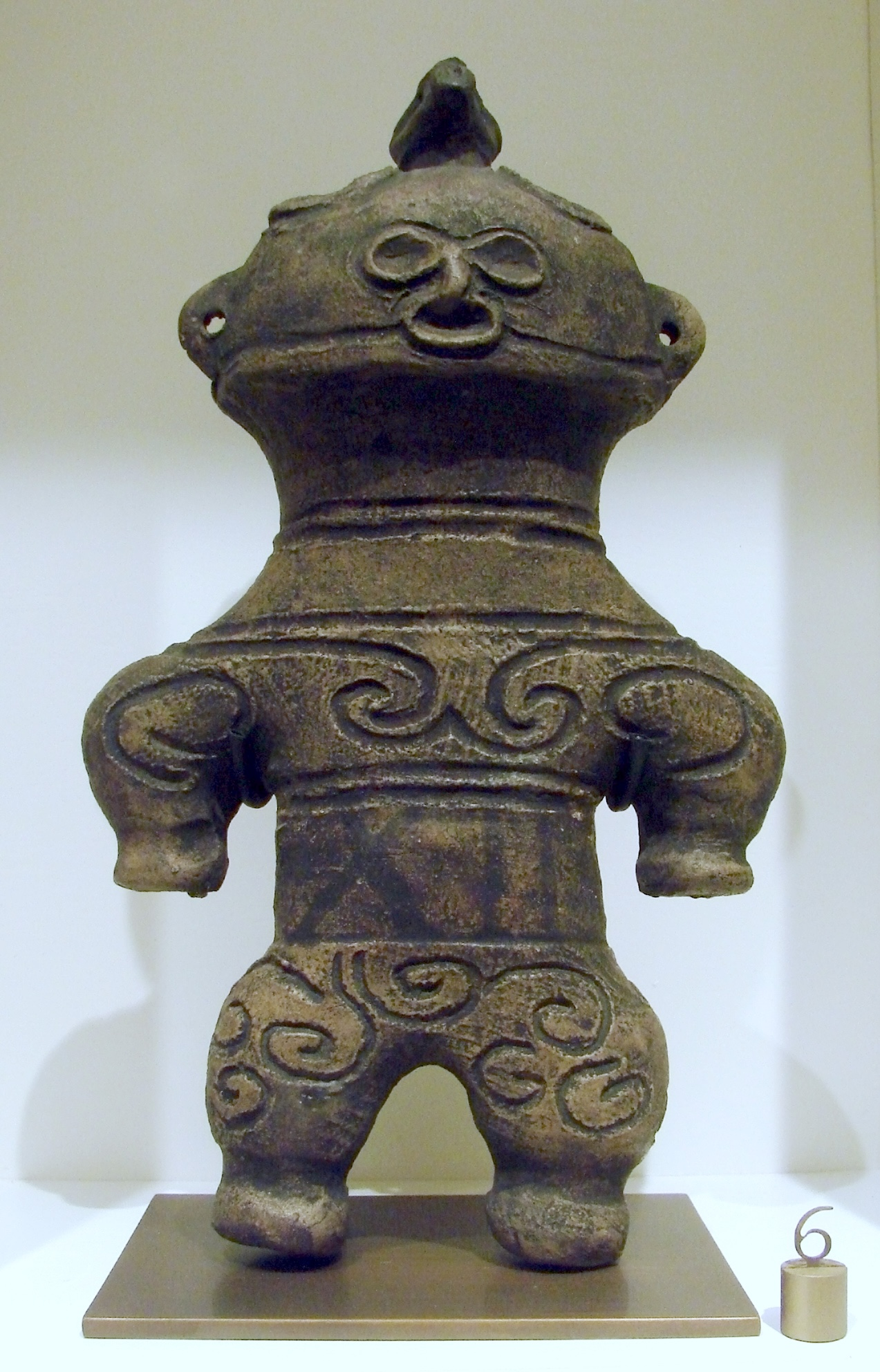
Dogū figurine, Jomon. Musée Guimet (70608 3).

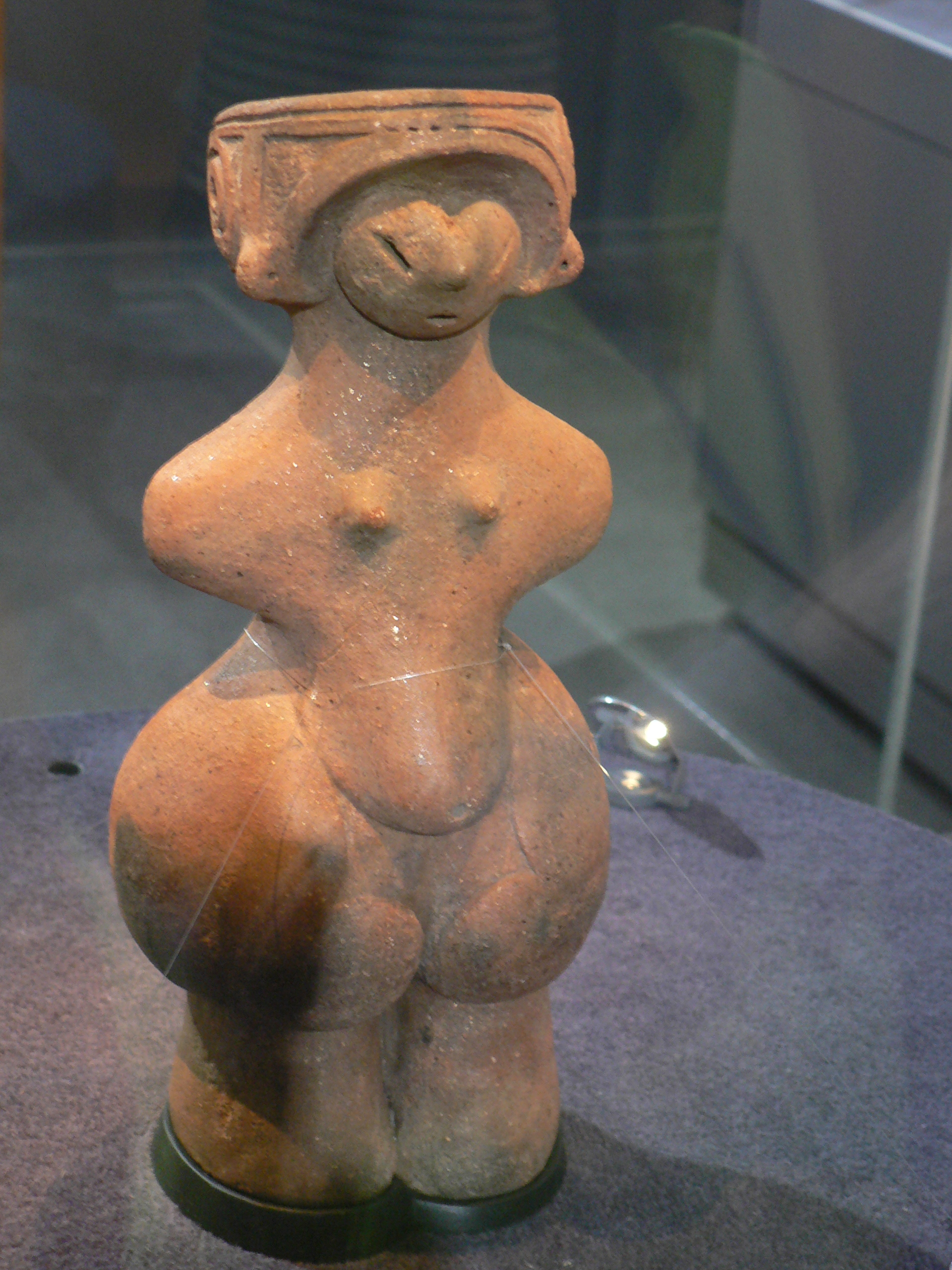
Jōmon Venus, National Treasure of Japan, Togariishi Jōmon Archeological Museum.

== Shakōkidogū ==
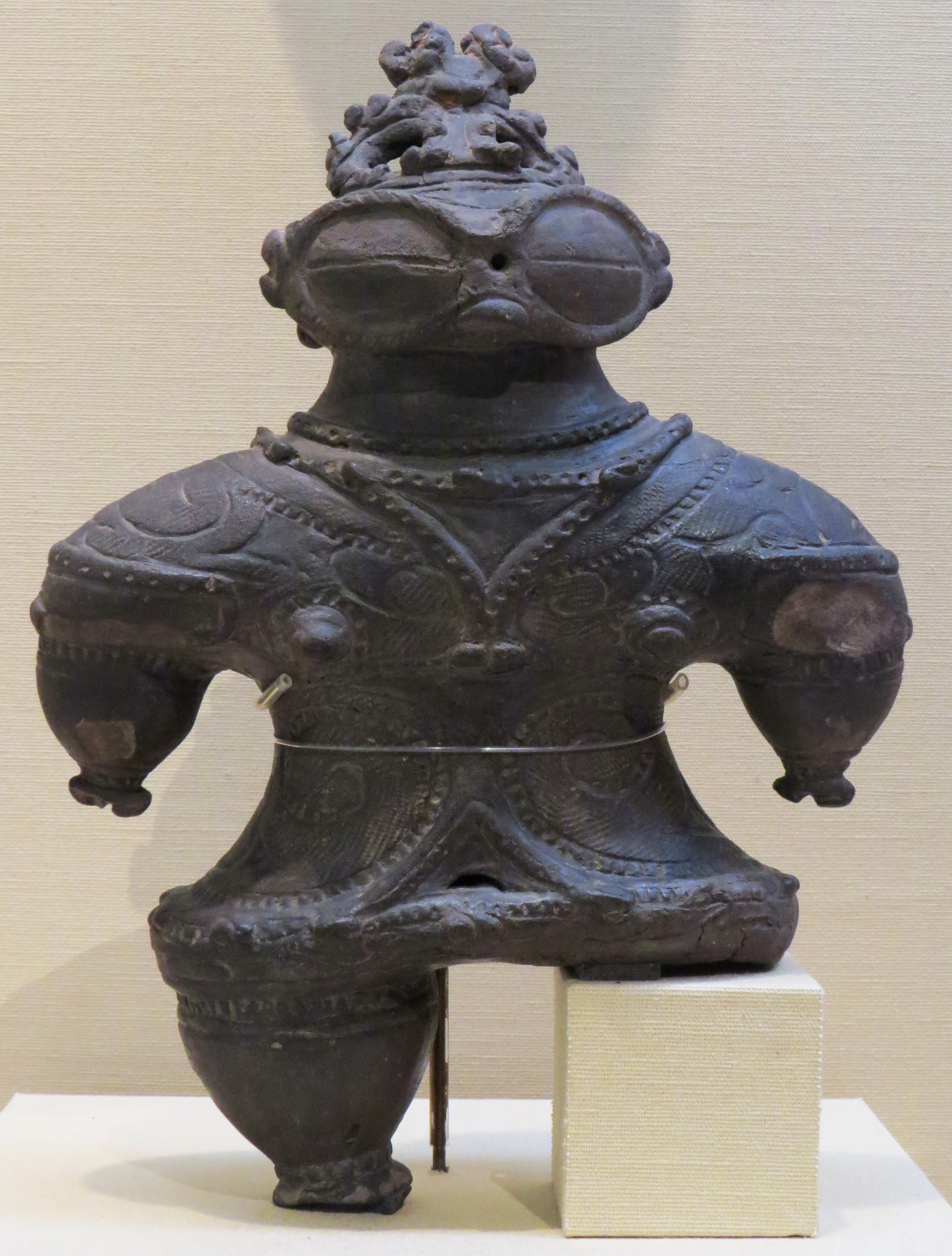
Shakōkidogū (遮光器土偶) (1000–400 BCE), "goggle-eyed type" figurine. Tokyo National Museum, Japan.

The Shakōkidogū (遮光器土偶), or "goggle-eyed dogū", were created in the Jōmon era, and are so well known that when most Japanese hear the term dogū, this is the image that comes to mind. The name shakōki (literally "light-blocking device") comes from the resemblance of the figures' eyes to traditional Inuit snow goggles. Another distinguishing feature of the objects are the exaggerated female buttocks, chest and thighs. Furthermore, the abdomen is covered with patterns, many of which seem to have been painted with vermilion. The larger figures are hollow.

Unbroken figures are rare, and most are missing an arm, leg or other body part. In many cases, the parts have been cut off.

These types of dogū have been found in the Kamegaoka Site in Tsugaru, Aomori Prefecture; the Teshiromori Site in Morioka, Iwate Prefecture; the Ebisuda Site in Tajiri, Miyagi Prefecture; and the Izumisawa Kaizuka Site in Ishinomaki, Miyagi Prefecture. All the sites listed have been designated as Important Cultural Properties.

== See also ==
- Haniwa, similar figures from the Kofun period
- National Treasures of Japan
- Tokyo National Museum
- Venus figurine, a type of figure found in archeological cultures throughout the world
- Zuijin
- Baltoy and Claydol, Pokémon that are based on Dogū.
- Shakkoumon, a Digimon based on the Shakōkidogū.
