= Jōmon people =

Prehistoric inhabitants in Japan

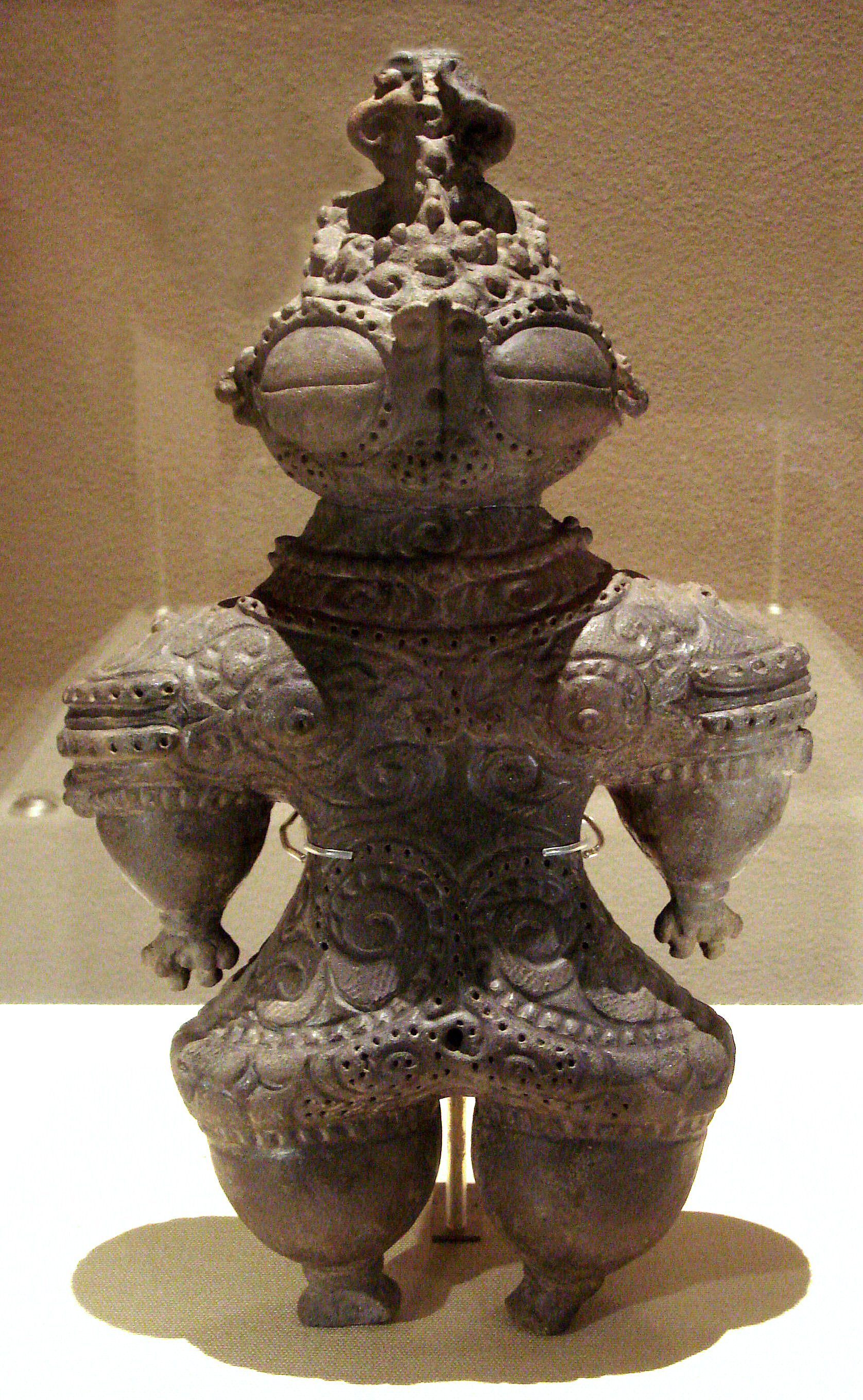
Jōmon Dogū pottery figure from the Late Jōmon Period, 1000–400 BC.

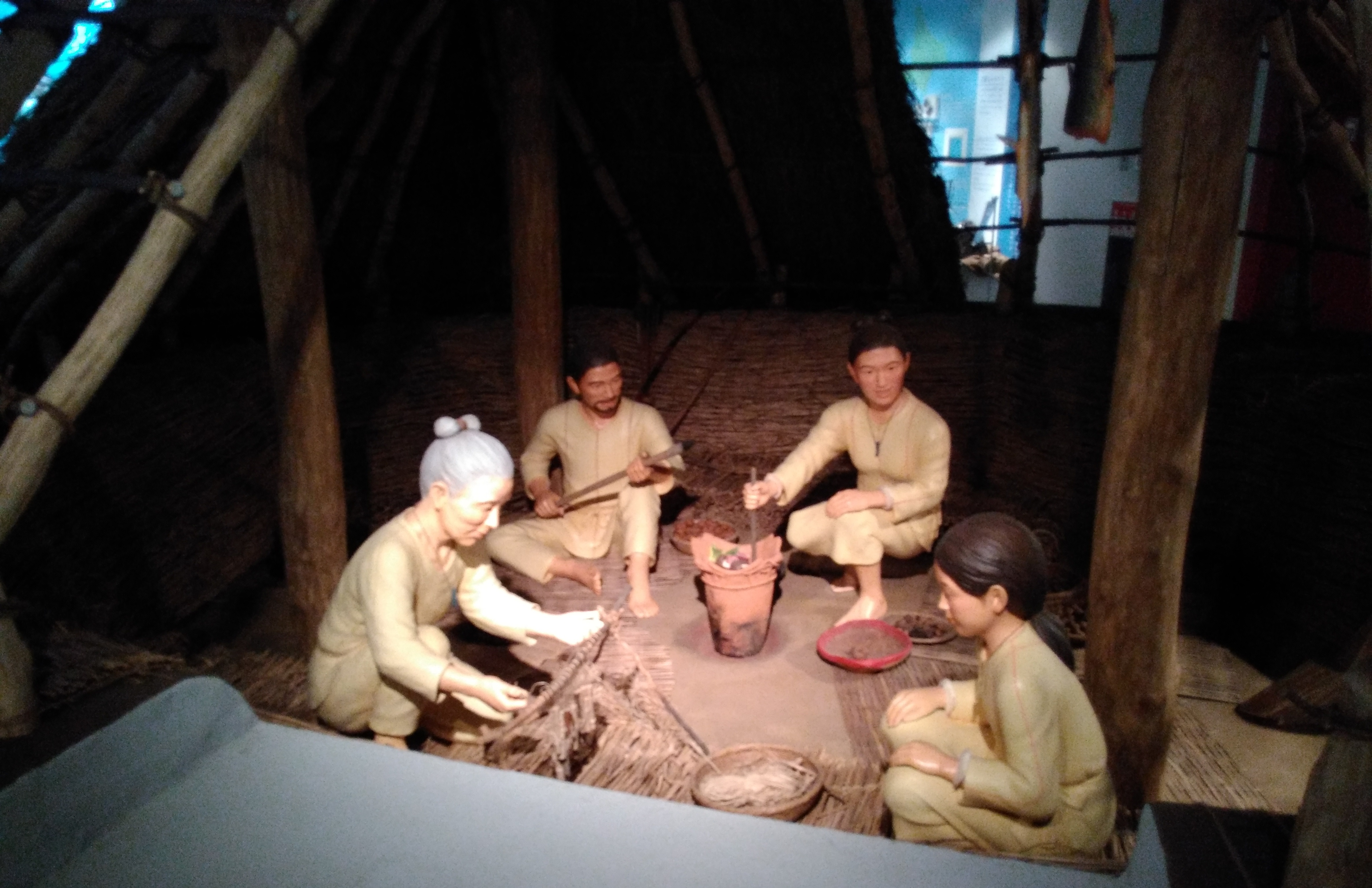
Diorama of Jōmon people at the Sannai-Maruyama museum

The Jōmon (Japanese: 縄文) were a prehistoric hunter-gatherer culture that inhabited the Japanese archipelago between approximately 14,000 BC and 300 BC, following which they were largely assimilated by migrants from mainland East Asia of the following Yayoi culture. The Jōmon people lived as sedentary hunter-gatherers, practicing plant foraging, fishing, hunting and to a lesser extent, farming. They also produced stone tools and pottery with distinctive "Jōmon markings". Jōmon ancestry forms a minor amount of the ancestry of the Yamato people (the dominant ethnic group in Japan), and a majority of the ancestry of the Ainu people of Hokkaido.

== Etymology ==
Jōmon (縄文, Jōmon), sometimes written as Jomon (US: /ˈdʒoʊˌmɑːn/ JOH-mahn, UK: /ˈdʒəʊmɒn/ JOH-mon), is a Japanese word directly translated as "cord-marked" or "cord pattern". The term was coined by American zoologist, archaeologist, and orientalist Edward S. Morse in his book Shell Mounds of Omori (1879), describing his excavation of the Ōmori Shell Mound near Tokyo and subsequent discovery of sherds of cord-marked pottery at the site in 1877. Morse translated "straw-rope pattern" from English to Japanese as Jōmon, which he would use to refer to the people living during this period of Japanese history. Other names for Jōmon pottery had been used in the first few decades after the discovery such as "Ainu school pottery" and "Shell mound pottery" before the term Jōmon became the standard term used by the archeological community. Indeed, it was not until 1937 that the Japanese historian Yamanouchi Sugao used the pottery-derived term to refer to the Paleolithic inhabitants of Japan.

Jōmon is a compound word composed of two kanji: 縄 and 文, the pronunciation and semantic value each being derived from their respective Go-on reading.

- 縄 (jō) – meaning "rope" or "cord", specifically "a flexible, heavy cord of tightly intertwined hemp or other fibers." The kun'yomi for this kanji derives etymologically from Old Japanese, from the Proto-Japonic napa, related to the verb 綯う (nau, "to plait or twist together into twine or line").
- 文 (mon) – meaning "pattern" or "design", as seen in words such as moyō (模様) or mon'yō (文様).

The word can thus be used as a common noun meaning "cord pattern", or as a shorter proper noun referring specifically to the Jōmon period. These kanji appear in various related terms, creating a lexical field centered around the Jōmon culture, which includes:

- 縄文時代 (Jōmon jidai, "Jōmon period")
- 縄文式土器 (Jōmon-shiki doki, "Jōmon ware")
- 縄文人 (Jōmon-jin, "Jōmon people")
- 縄文土器 (Jōmon doki, "Jōmon pottery")

== Lifestyle ==
Like many hunter-gatherer societies, the day to day life of the Jōmon was largely centered around activities like hunting, fishing, foraging for tree nuts, and catching shellfish. However, it has also been suggested that the Jōmon people practiced forms of early agriculture, such as the regular cultivation of adzuki beans and soybeans. The Jōmon people also used pottery, and generally lived in semi-permanent pit dwellings, characteristics more typically associated with late mesolithic or early neolithic agriculturalists.

=== Settlements ===
The modern Jōmon chronology commonly accepted by scholars generally follows that first laid out by Serizawa in Jōmon Pottery Classification and Chronology, published in 1956. Archaeological evidence suggests that settlements changed throughout the different phases of the Jōmon Period.

- Incipient Jōmon settlements were the first sedentary settlements in Japan and consisted only of dwellings. An example of this type of settlement is the Odai Yamamoto 1 Site.
- Initial Jōmon settlements begin to show signs of cultural complexity on account of the appearance of gravesites during this period. The residential area and the cemetery were separated. An example of such settlement is the Kakinoshima site.
- Early Jōmon settlements gained more use-specific features: the storage area and the dump area. Sites representative of this period are the Kitakogane site, Tagoyano site, Futatsumori Site, and Korekawa Site.
- Middle Jōmon saw the development of hub settlements and the division of dump and ritual spaces. Sites representative of this period are the Sannai-Maruyama Site, Ōfune Site, Goshono site, and Korekawa Site.
- Late Jōmon saw the dissolution of hub settlements into smaller ones with a shared ritual center which also functioned as its cemetery. Some of the sites of this period include the Irie site, Komakino Site, Isedōtai Ruins, and Ōyu Stone Circles.
- Final Jōmon saw the separation of the ritual site and the cemetery into two separate sites shared by multiple settlements. Some of the sites in this period include the Kiusu Earthwork Burial Circles, Ōmori Katsuyama Site, Takasago Burial Site, Kamegaoka Stone Age Site, and Korekawa Site.

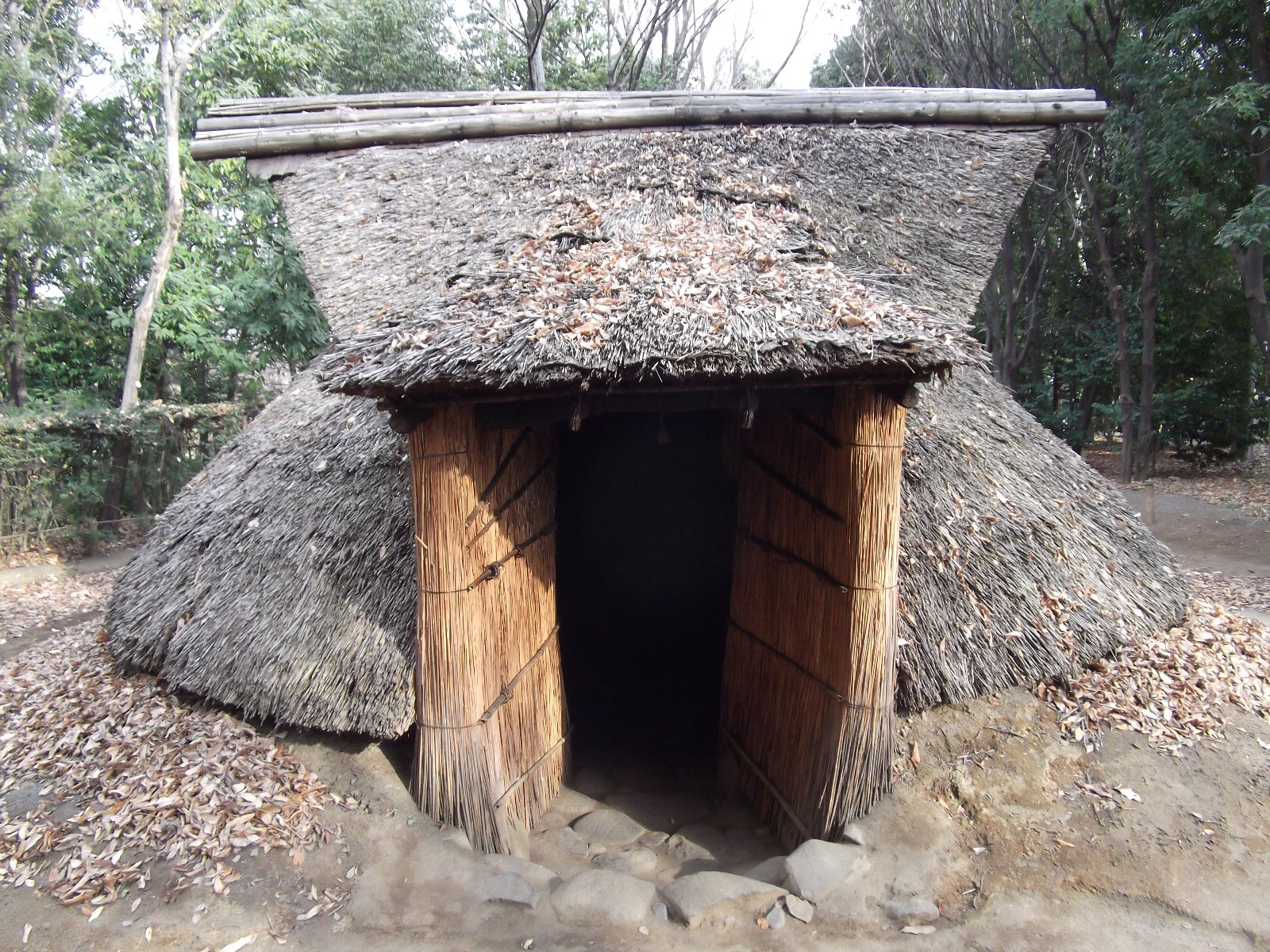
Reconstruction of a Jōmon pit dwelling.

The Korekawa site, in Hachinohe, Aomori Prefecture, is unique because it has three subsites, each from a different Jōmon timeframe: Ichioji Site (一王寺遺跡) (Early to Middle Jōmon period), Hotta Site (堀田遺跡) (Middle Jōmon period), and Nakai Site (中居遺跡) (Final Jōmon period). They are near each other on a terrace by the Niida River. Ichioji is the largest of the three subsites, while Nakai is the smallest but has yielded the most artifacts.

The excavation of Sannai Maruyama Site has revealed networks of what are believed to be unpaved, Jōmon-era roadways. In addition to connecting the areas, buildings, and ritual spaces within the settlement itself, it theorized these paths may have also extended to other settlements. On both sides of the roads were aligned graves of various types and characteristics, including pit graves, tumuli, the graves of children, and stone circle graves. Further excavations along these long-forgotten pathways have also revealed both standard and large pit dwellings, dumping grounds, storage pits, unknown pillar-supported structures of various sizes, and a watering place used for soaking Japanese horse chestnuts.

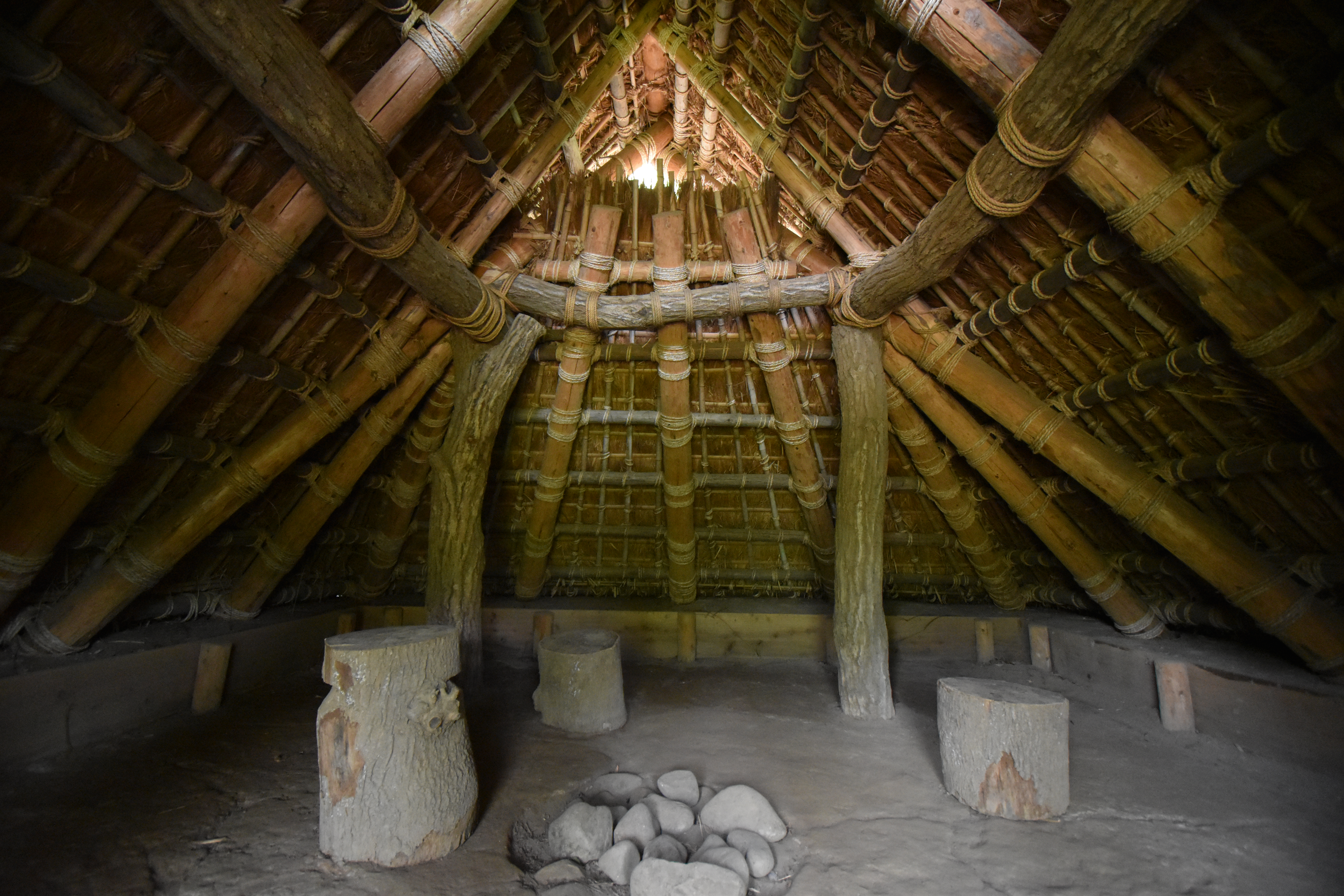
Reconstructed Jōmon pit dwelling interior at the Ōgushi Site.

As mentioned, Jōmon people typically resided in pit dwellings, semi-subterranean buildings built by digging a shallow hole in the ground, constructing a roof extending upwards from each side, and placing a hearth in its center. As Jōmon pit dwellings are relatively small compared to other prehistoric cultures, it is believed that each dwelling would have housed a family of four to six people for as long as two to three generations. The roofs enclosing these spaces were made of bark or thatch and may have been covered with soil to provide an extra layer of insulation. Altars may have also been installed in some of them. Pit dwellings longer than 10m are classified as large pit dwellings, which most likely functioned as communal spaces like meeting places, workshops, or shared winter residences comparable to contemporaneous Meso- and Neolithic structures found in Europe and the Americas.

=== Tools ===
Like other Paleolithic cultures, Jōmon sites display widespread evidence of the use and production of stone tools. Jōmon tools were most commonly fashioned from chipped stone, made of siliceous shale. However, tools made from other types of stone, wood, and rarer materials such as obsidian and jade have also been discovered in Jōmon-period sites.

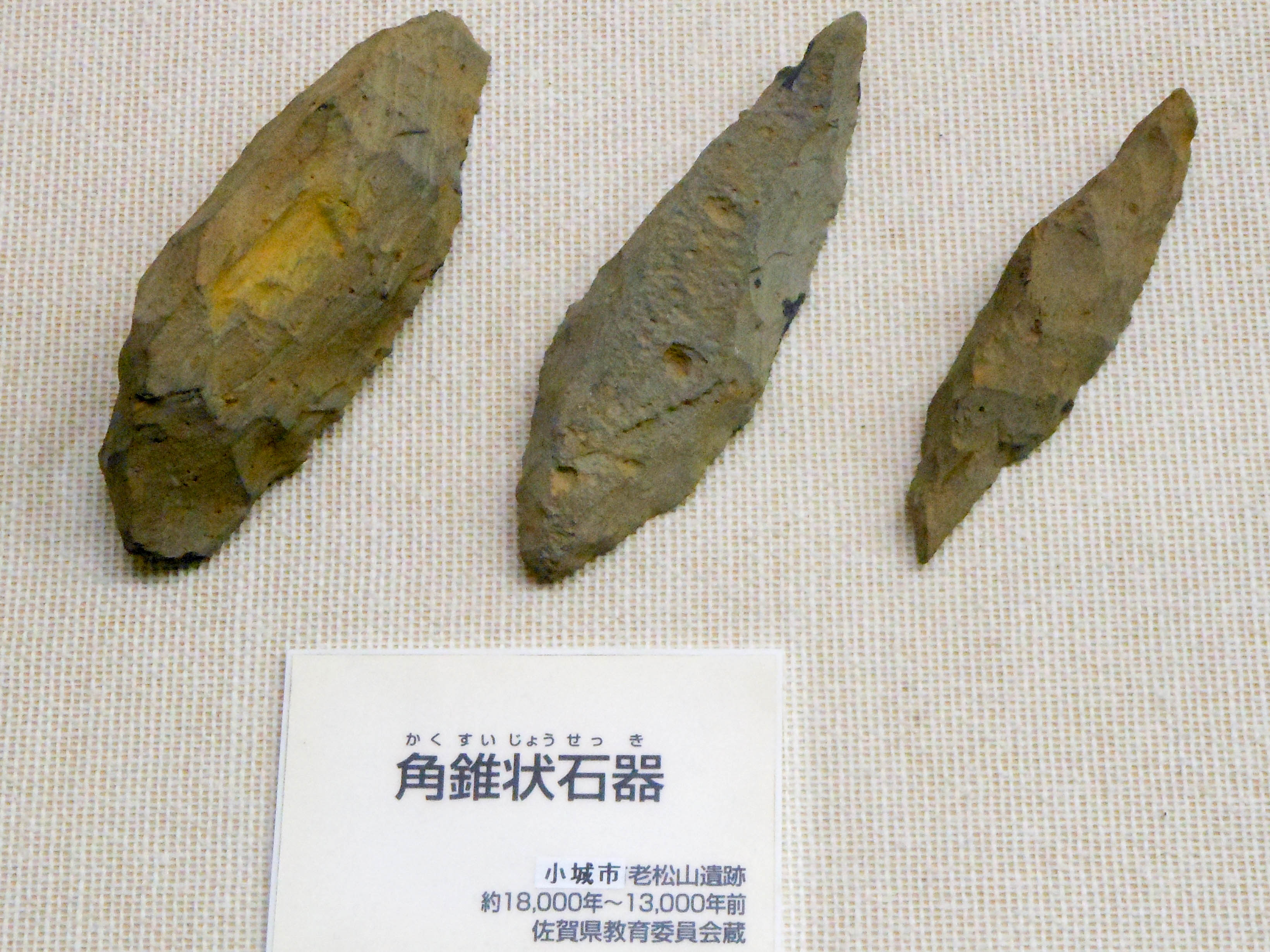
Early Jōmon-period stone tools excavated from the Oimatsuyama site, on display at the Saga Prefectural Museum.

These types of tools included but were not limited to: knives, stone drills, spearheads, arrowheads, scrapers sometimes with barbs or stemmed, semi-circular flat chipped stone tools believed to have been used in the preparation of food. In the case of tools built from multiple parts such as spears or arrows, Jōmon toolmakers used bitumen as an adhesive to bind the stone point with its wooden shaft.

However, some stone implements appear to have been made without the normal chipping process. This includes ground stone axes, made from granodiorite, greenstone, or blueschist, abrasion cutting stone tools, whetstones, grindstones with or without grooves, hammer stones, saddle querns, and stone weights.

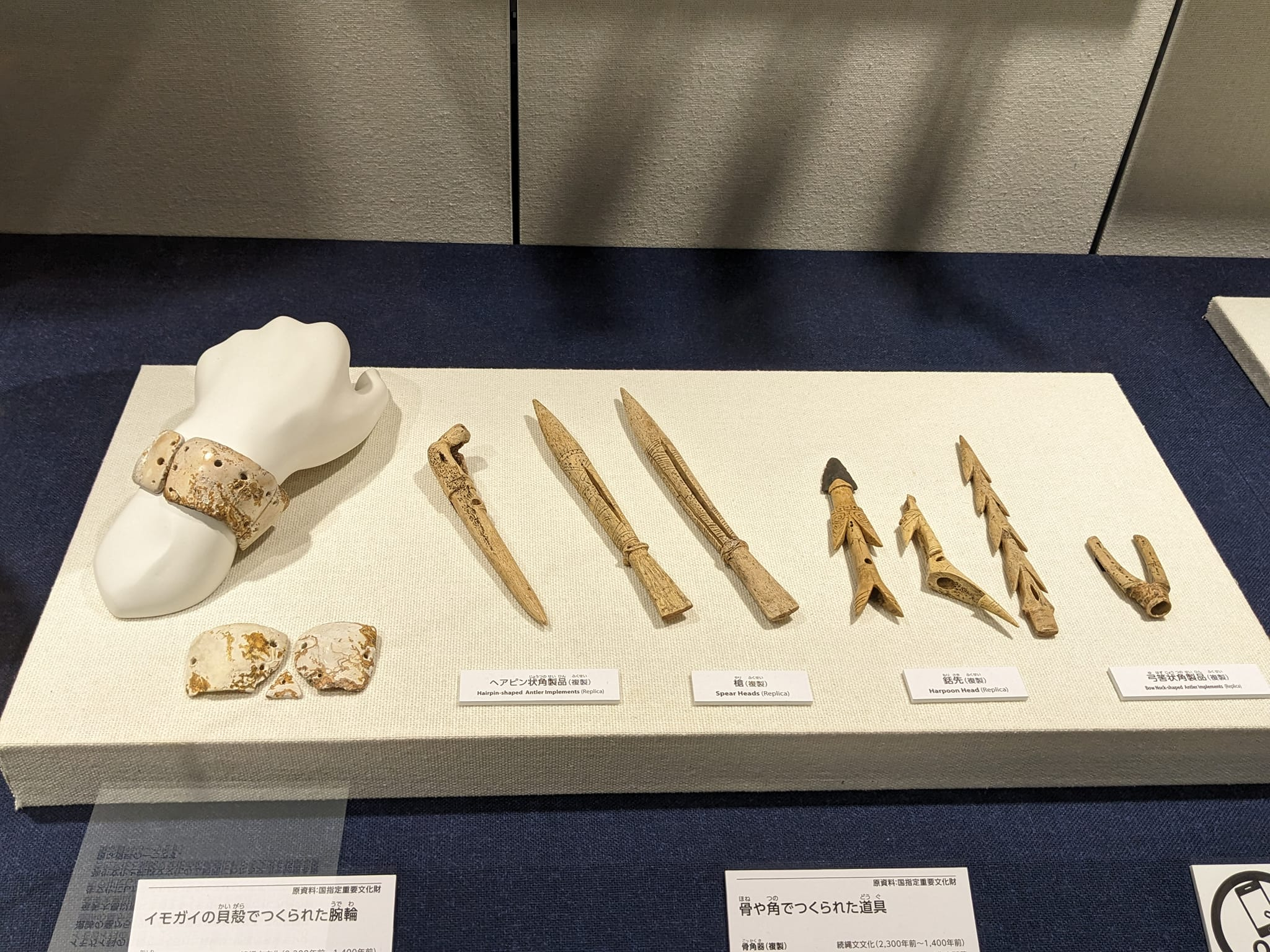
Bone tools from the Zoku-Jōmon Period, on display at the Hokkaido Museum.

Antlers and bones were also used for tools such as spatulas, fish hooks, harpoon heads, drills, and needles. Exclusive to antlers were hammers, where the base of the antler was used as the impact surface. Wood was used for making shafts of spears, arrows, harpoons, bows, and digging sticks while strips of bark were used to weave baskets.

=== Hunting ===
The Jōmon people were incredibly skilled, likely opportunistic hunters capable of tracking, catching, and killing a wide variety of both large and small game endemic to their environment. These included flying squirrels, hares, weasels, martens, foxes, squirrels, tanuki (raccoon dogs), wild boar, deer, bears, sea lions, badgers, apes, snow monkeys, otters, cormorants, albatrosses, pheasants, grebes, geese, and ducks. Hunting techniques included the use of projectile weapons like bows and spears, pitfall traps, and hunting dogs.

The percentage of prey hunted varies from site to site, but generally wild boars and deer were the staple of what was, in the case of the Jōmon, a largely carnivorous diet. However, in the Sannai Maruyama site, flying squirrels and hares are the dominant sources of meat most likely as a result of environmental factors.

=== Fishing ===
Archaeologists have uncovered the bones of many species of fish and other types of seafood in Jōmon dumping grounds. Given the variety of the species consumed, some of which would have required considerable travel to catch, it has been postulated that the Jōmon were adept fishermen and mariners. Some of the marine species found at Jōmon sites include yellowtail amberjack, right-eyed flounder, various types of sharks, mackerel, herring, flounder, scorpion fishes, globefish, greenling, Pacific sea bream, and Pacific cod. The Jōmon also gathered shellfish, including Japanese oysters, Ezo abalones, clams, crabs, octopuses, squid, mantis shrimp, and other types of crustaceans.

The Jōmon fished using harpoons, spears, lines, and nets. Jōmon harpoon heads were detachable and could be reeled in using ropes tied through their base. Harpoons and spears were used to catch larger prey, line fishing for smaller prey was done using fish hooks fashioned from antler or bone. Jōmon fish hooks generally fall into two categories: single-ended hooks and coupled/combined hooks. The main difference between the two was that coupled fish hooks were barbed while single-ended hooks were not. However, both types had notches to tie the line. Stone weights were attached to nets to act as sinkers.

There is evidence that the Jōmon people built ships out of large trees and used them for fishing and traveling. However, it is still debated whether Jōmon watercraft used sails or paddles as their primary means of propulsion.

=== Plant foraging and domestication ===
The Jōmon grew trees close to their settlements and gathered edible wild plants. Chestnuts were an especially common part of Jōmon diets, while trees themselves were frequently used as fuel and building material. Other types of flora regularly consumed by the Jōmon include walnuts, Japanese horse chestnuts, adzuki beans, Udo, silver vines, elderberries, wild grapes, mulberries, raspberries, and yams. Roots, tubers such as yams, and other subterranean forage was dug up using digging sticks. However, plant genomics studies have indicated that the adzuki bean was domesticated in eastern Japan between 3,000 and 5,000 years ago, suggesting that, in addition to gathering and cultivating wild plant species, the Jōmon were engaged in early plant domestication.

=== Food processing ===
Nuts, walnuts, and chestnuts were collected during autumn and were kept in storage pits or indoor inside large earthenware pots. Before use, they were crushed with hammer stones or grinding stone on top of saddle querns. Japanese horse chestnut and other chestnuts with strong scents were soaked in water to mellow their taste. At the Sannai Maruyama Site, archaeologists discovered a reservoir, filled and emptied by a spring, that may have been used to process nuts through soaking. The Jōmon might have also been able to distill alcohol using elderberries.

=== Cooking ===
Cooking was done on the pit dwelling's central hearth using smaller, purpose-made earthenware pots distinct from those used for storage. During the Middle Jōmon period, earthenware was made in various shapes including pedestal dishes and bowls used to serve food. Round wooden containers are thought to have been held in one hand while pouring liquids, although the purpose of the custom remains a mystery.

=== Trade networks ===
The Jōmon maintained extensive trade networks that extended several hundred kilometers across the Japanese archipelago. Key trade items included obsidian, gemstones such as jade, amber, asphalt, red pigments, and various types of stone materials used to produce polished stone axes including granodiorite, greenstone, and blueschist. For example, Moroiso-style pottery, which is just south of Tokyo, in the Kansai region, has been found as far south as the Satogi site in Okayama Prefecture and as far north as the Taigi and Tashirojima sites in Miyagi Prefecture, both about 500 kilometers (310 miles) from Moroiso.

Some materials were transported in raw form, while others were traded as refined or finished goods. Certain Jōmon sites appear to have specialized in the production of specific raw materials or crafted items. For example, the Sannai Maruyama site, a major trading hub, was particularly known for its jade artifacts. Its inhabitants also engaged in the exchange of finished obsidian tools raw obsidian sourced, in some cases, from as far away as Hokkaido and Nagano. These tools, made of high-quality obsidian, have been found over 700 kilometers from their origin points.

Evidence of trade between the Jōmon of Hokkaido and Honshu, as well as between those living on the Kyushu and Ryukyu Islands, would further suggest that the Jōmon were skilled navigators and seafarers capable of long-distance maritime travel. According to a 2006 study, it is possible that the Jōmon traded with Southern Chinese and Southeast Asians via Fujian.

== Culture ==
Elements of Jōmon culture are believed to be preserved in various aspects of modern Japanese culture. These include early forms of spiritual beliefs that preceded Shinto, as well as marriage customs, architectural styles, festivals, and traditional crafts such as lacquerware and pottery. These cultural traits are considered integral to the development of Japanese cultural identity.

Other examples of Jōmon influence in present Japanese culture, especially in Kyūshū, include the worship of Ame-no-Uzume (アメノウズメ) in Miyazaki Prefecture, Ta no Kami-sa (田の神さぁ) in the Aso region of Kumamoto Prefecture, and the Mishaguji (ミシャグジ) belief system.

=== Pottery ===
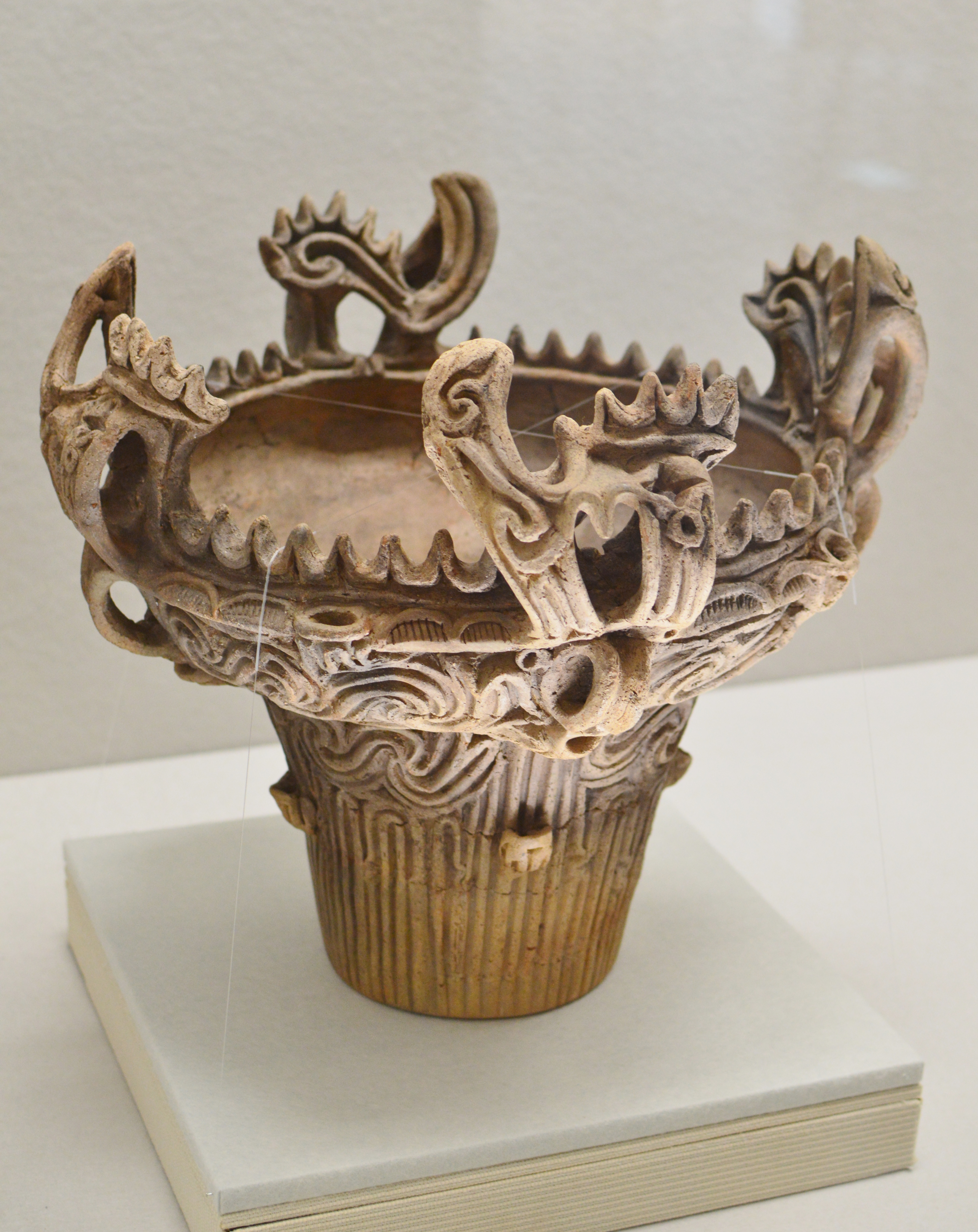
Kaen-style pottery (火焔型土器)

Jōmon pottery is identifiable by its distinctive cord-marked patterns, a style in which ropes were pressed into the surface of wet clay to create decorative designs. This technique, characteristic of the early Jōmon period, is widely regarded as one of the oldest forms of pottery in East Asia and the world. Among the most famous examples is the kaen-style pottery (火焔型土器, kaen-gata doki) from the Middle Jōmon period, noted for its elaborate patterns and dynamic forms.

In addition to pottery and jars, the Jōmon people also produced a large number of highly stylized clay figurines (dogū) and clay masks, reflecting a rich tradition of symbolic and ritualistic art.

=== Lacquerware ===
Lacquerware included wooden bowls, dishes, and combs. It was mixed with red pigments to give it a red color. Lacquer tree sap was collected from cultivated and managed areas. The steps to make lacquerware were:

- Collect the sap
- Remove the excess moisture
- Purify the sap
- Mix it with red pigments
- Apply the lacquer by hand to the ware

Red pigments were made from ferrous quartz, then ground into powder before mixing it with lacquer. Some pottery was directly painted with red pigments instead of lacquering it.

=== Clothing ===
Fabric made with twisted warp called angin were found at Sannai Maruyama. It is believed that cloth and clothings were made of weaved twisted plant fiber such as hemp in this way.

The Jōmon people also practiced sewing using needles of bone and antler.

=== Jewelry and accessories ===
Magatama – kidney-shaped beads – are commonly found in Jōmon period Japanese finds, as well as in parts of Northeast Asia and Siberia.

A wide variety of materials were used in the creation of Jōmon accessories, including clay, stone, bone, shells, and lacquered wood. These ornaments are believed to have been used not only for special occasions but also in everyday life.

Excavations have uncovered bone hairpins and lacquered wooden combs, which were likely used to fasten and decorate tied hair. Cylindrical or drum-shaped earrings made of clay were worn by inserting them into pierced earlobes, while slender stone earrings were also passed through ear holes.

Many of these ornament styles show notable similarities to accessories found in later periods of Japanese history, suggesting a lasting influence of Jōmon aesthetics on subsequent Japanese decorative traditions.

==== Magatama ====
Magatama are curved, comma-shaped beads with a distinctive C-shape and a hole at one end, typically used as ornaments or ceremonial objects. They are believed to have been invented by the Jōmon people and have been excavated from archaeological sites throughout Japan.

Magatama continued to be widely used not only during the Jōmon period but also throughout the Yayoi and Kofun periods, remaining an important accessory in Japanese culture. Today, magatama are still revered as sacred objects in various Shinto shrines and also appear in Japanese mythology. One of the Imperial Regalia of Japan, the Yasakani no Magatama (八尺瓊勾玉), is considered a symbol of the Japanese monarchy.

These artifacts were most commonly made from jade (jadeite), but examples crafted from stone, clay, and boar tusks have also been discovered. The materials and production techniques varied by region and era, reflecting both local resources and cultural influences.

== Religion ==
It is suggested that the religion of the Jōmon people was similar to early Shinto, specifically Ko-Shintō. It was largely based on animism, and possibly shamanism. Other similar religions are the Ryukyuan and Ainu religions. Certain strange stone implements in various shapes are thought to have been used as talismans.

=== Rituals and festivals ===
Accessories and jewelry are thought to have been worn more during special occasions such as festivals, burials, and rituals than in everyday life.

Central ritual sites outside settlements and belonging to multiple villages have started to appear during the Late Jōmon period but hub settlements also acting as central ritual hubs appeared during the Middle Jōmon period.

Mounds were built using refuse from soil excavation and daily life activities, but were not merely dumping grounds; instead, they had special significance as places of rituals.

Stone and clay figurines are believed to have been used for festivals. Many represented women with breasts and parts or holes possibly representing genitalia. They are thought to have been a way of praying for fertility in festivals. Asphalt has been used on some of them to attempt to repair them.

Miniature pottery are earthenware in extremely small sized modelled after utilitarian-sized vessels such as deep bowls for cooking and storing and shallow bowls for serving food. They are thought to have been used in ceremonies rather than as toys due to their excavations in ceremonial mounds.

Other objects found in ceremonial mounds include triangular pottery (theorized to be simplified versions of clay figurines), stick-shaped clay objects (thought to be a miniature pottery version of stone rods), stamp-shaped stones (thought to be modelled after female genitalia), walnut clay objects (created by pressing clay against inner shell of walnuts), and pottery with human figure (theorized to be shamans with head ornaments and tools).

Sword-shaped artefacts made of whale bone have been excavated and are thought to have been used in fire related rituals as most have burned marks. The Jōmon also crafted stone batons or rods and swords which are thought to have been used for rituals and festivals as many have been exposed to fire. Other artefacts such as large jade beads have also been exposed to fire.

In Sannai Maruyama, a large structure made of 6 great pillars of chestnuts between 1 and 2 meters in diameter has been repeatedly built through the ages. It is thought to have played multiple roles such as a ritual venue, totem pole, observatory, lighthouse, and watchtower.

=== Burials ===
Graves were different for different people with adult graves being different from children's and from a few important people.

- Adults were buried in pit graves, some with pebbles acting as grave markers or soil mounds on top of them.
- Important people were buried in pit graves surrounded by stone circles.
- Children were buried in reused everyday pottery and placed together away from the other graves: some had modifications done to the pottery such as breaking the rim or piercing holes at the bottom or side of it. It is possible that only infant were buried in this fashion. Some of them had fist-sized circular pebbles or flaking tools in them.

Most graves did not contain grave goods. For those that had them, it is believed that men and women were buried with different objects: hunting tools and stone arrowheads, and cooking utensils such as saddle quern respectively.

In Sannai Maruyama, pit graves have been excavated on both sides of roads, feet towards the road at slight angles. At this same site, pillar-supported structures may have been used for temporary resting place for the deceased.

Smoke-dried mummification of the dead was also practiced by the Jōmon peoples and was followed by various peoples such as Papuans, Aboriginal Australians, Southeast Asians, Northern Chinese, Koreans and indigenous inhabitants of the Amur River basin.

== Languages ==
It is not known what language or languages were spoken in Japan during the Jōmon period. Suggested languages are: the Ainu language, Japonic languages, Austronesian languages, or unknown and today extinct languages. While the most supported view is to equate the Ainu language with the Jōmon language, this view is not uncontroversial or easily acceptable as there were probably multiple distinct language families spoken by the Jōmon period population of the Japanese archipelago.

Alexander Vovin (1993) argues that the Ainu languages originated in central Honshu, and were later pushed northwards into Hokkaido, where the early Ainu-speakers merged with local groups, forming the historical Ainu ethnicity. Bilingualism between Ainu and Japanese was common in Tohoku until the 10th century. According to Vovin (2021) there is also some evidence for the presence of Austronesian languages close to the Japanese archipelago, which may have contributed some loanwords to early Japanese.

Some linguists suggest that the Japonic languages may have been already present within the Japanese archipelago and coastal Korea, before the Yayoi period, and can be linked to one of the Jōmon populations of southwestern Japan, rather than the later Yayoi or Kofun period rice-agriculturalists. Japonic-speakers rapidly grew during the Yayoi period by assimilating the newcomers, adopting rice growing, and fusing mainland Asian technologies with local traditions.

== Origins ==
The Jōmon people represent the Upper Paleolithic inhabitants of the Japanese archipelago and their descendants. They were isolated from other mainland Asian groups about 22,000 to 25,000 years ago and have been described as "one of the most deeply diverged populations in East Asia".

=== Genetics ===
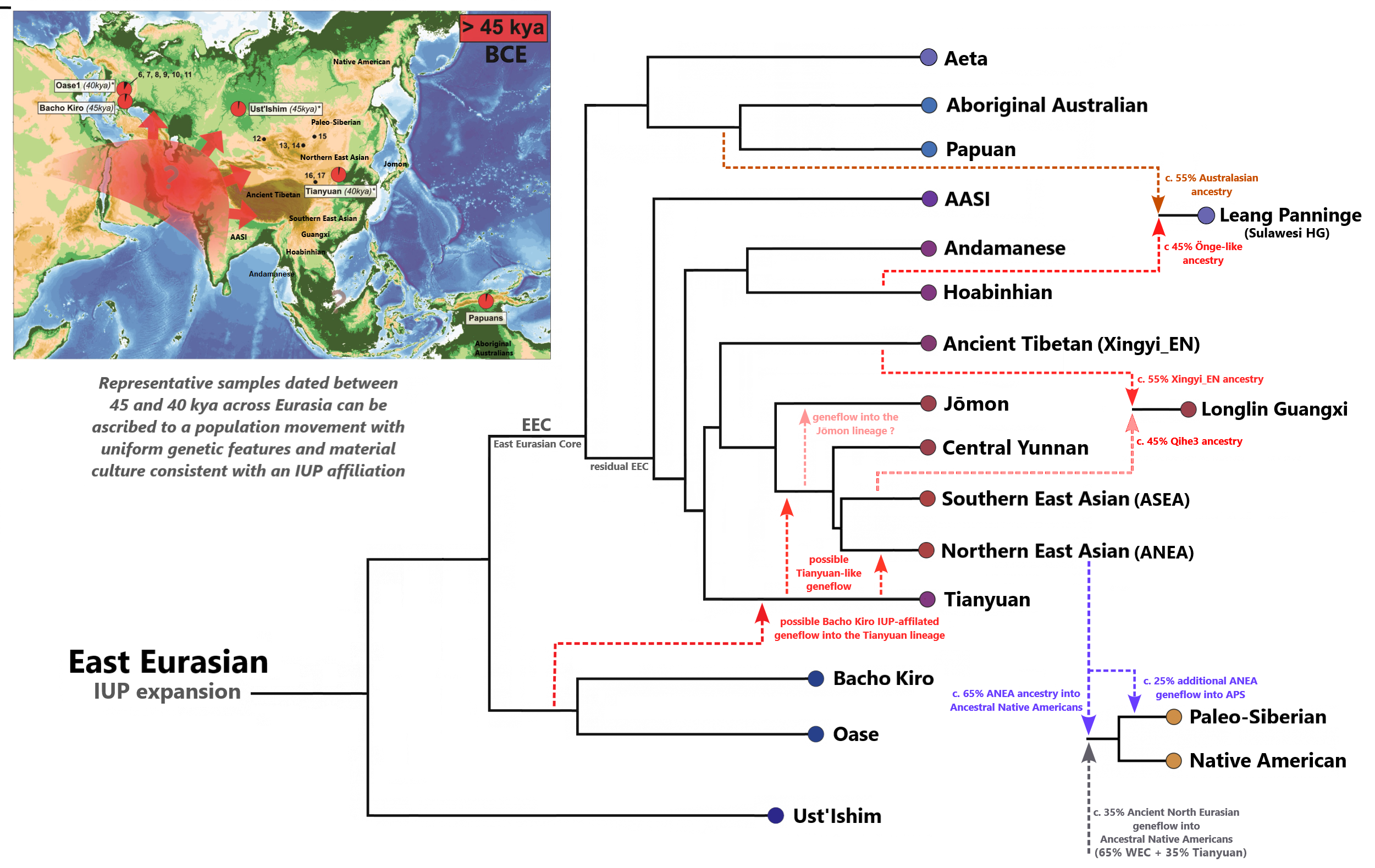
Phylogenetic position of the Jōmon lineage among other East Eurasians

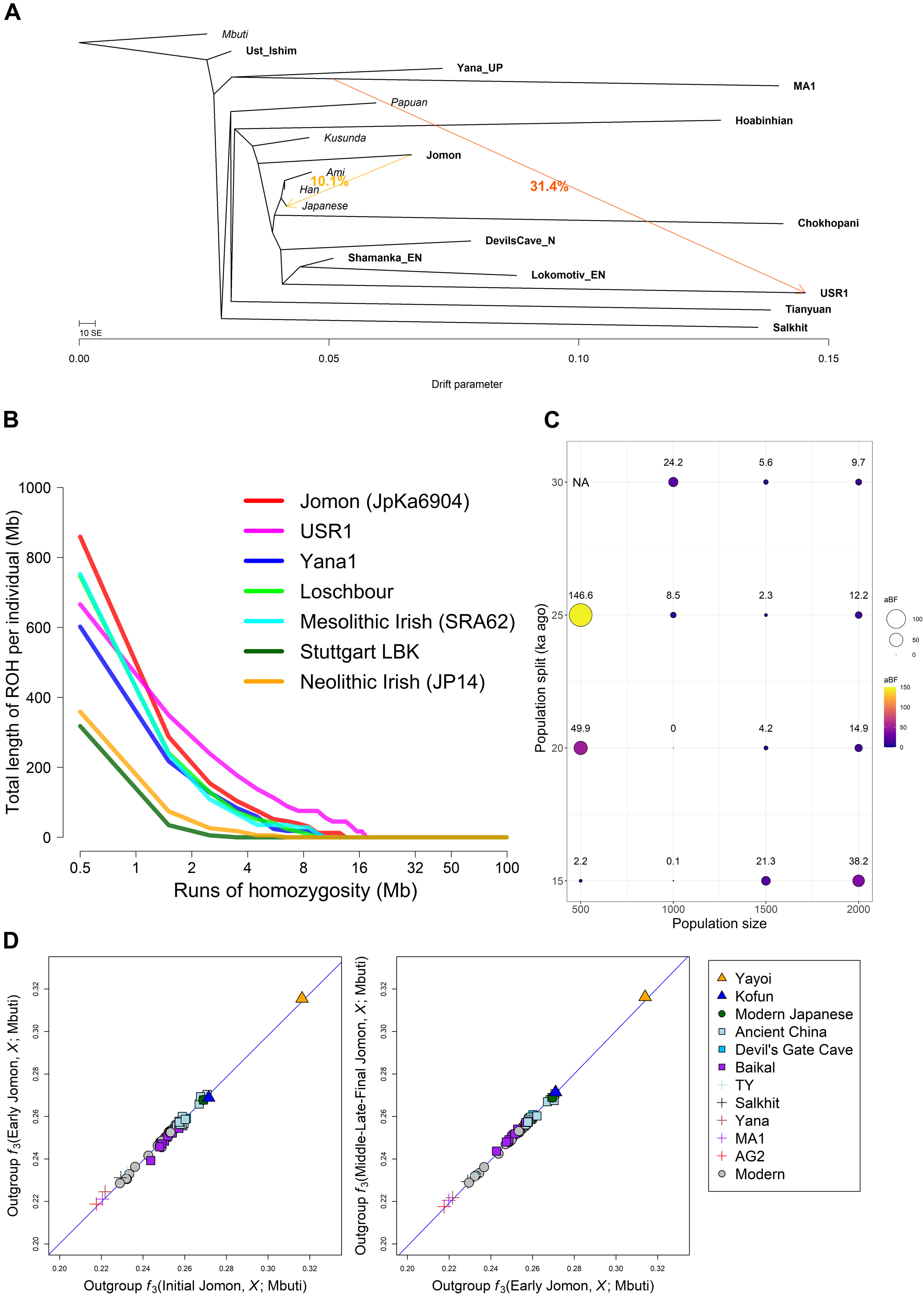
Demographic history of the Jomon lineage (A) Maximum likelihood phylogenetic tree reconstructed by TreeMix under a model of two migrations

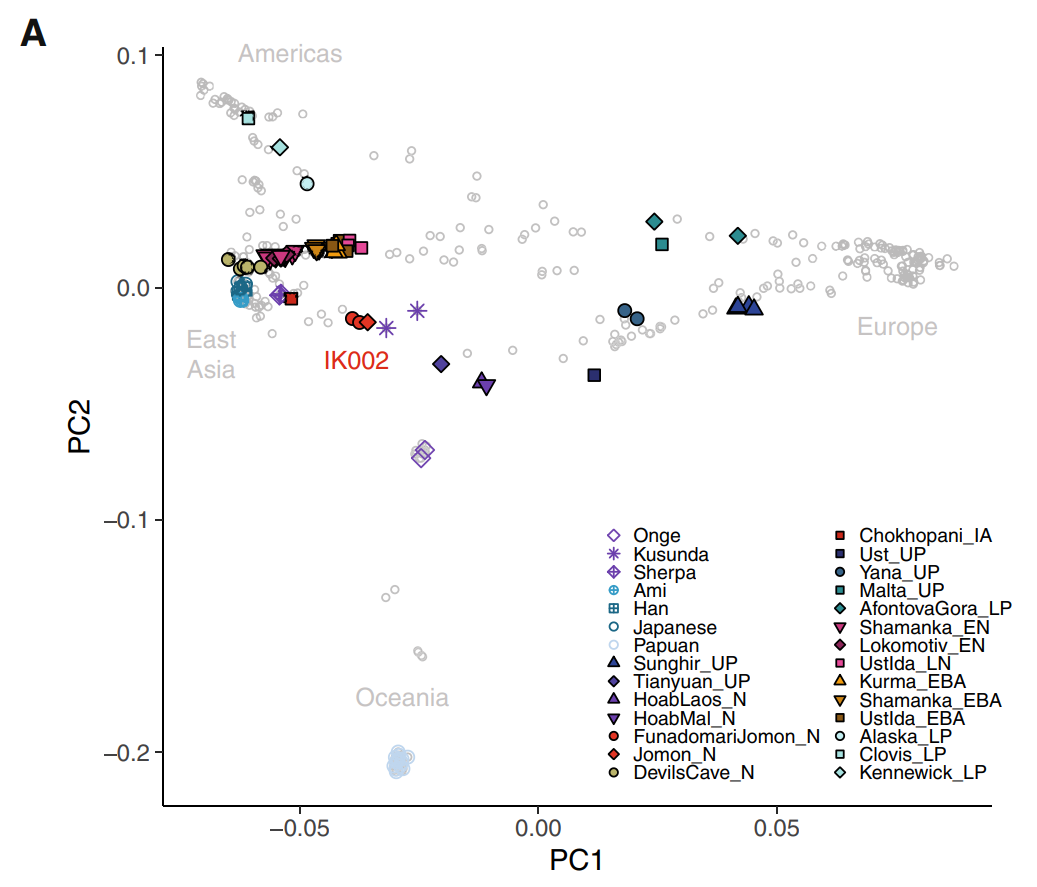
Principal component analysis (PCA) of ancient and present-day individuals from worldwide populations

The Jōmon lineage is inferred to have diverged from Ancient East Asians between 25,000 to 38,000 years ago, after the divergence of the Basal East Asian Tianyuan and Hoabinhian lineages, but before Ancient East Asians split into Ancient Northern East Asians and Ancient Southern East Asians. Like other East Asian populations, the ancestors of the Jōmon people are suggested to have originated from Southeast Asia and expanded northwards to East Asia via both an interior and a coastal route. They represent one of the "earliest waves of migration". A 2026 study suggested that the ancestors of the Jōmon could have migrated to the Japanese archipelago via a route through the Korean peninsula or Eastern China Sea. Some studies model the Jōmon lineage as a mixture of Onge-related (44%) and Tianyuan-related (56%) ancestries or as a mixture of Onge-related (51.6%) and Early Neolithic Xiaogao-related (48.4%) ancestries, with the latter having Tungusic affinities. Other studies state that the Jōmon share ancestral components with the Yokchido individual from ancient Korea as well as populations from East Asia, Southeast Asia and Oceania. Alternatively, the Jōmon lineage can be modeled as a relatively unadmixed lineage.

Overall, Jōmon ancestry consistently forms a clade with Ancient Northern and Southern East Asians. They diverged from Ancient East Asians around the same time as the Longlin specimen from Guangxi, China although other studies show an earlier divergence date for the latter. The Jōmon likewise diverged from Ancient East Asians much later than the basal Asian Xingyi_EN lineage found in Yunnan, China. According to Wang et al. (2025), the ancestors of Ancient East Asians were a mixture of Tianyuan-related and Xingyi_EN-related lineages. The Jōmon also exhibit a high degree of genetic homogeneity, which is attributed to "strong bottleneck and small effective population size".

Beyond their genetic affinities with other East Eurasian lineages, the Jōmon display marginally significant genetic affinities with the Yana Rhinoceros Horn Site specimen, associated with Ancient North Eurasians (or Ancient North Siberians). This indicates gene flow between Ancient North Siberians and the ancestral Jōmon prior to the Jōmon's isolation from other East Eurasians. This gene flow is also associated with the introduction of microblade technology to Northern Japan. According to Bennett et al. (2024), the Basal Asian-like ancestors of the Jōmon might have interacted with groups that entered Siberia through a northern migration route, explaining the observed affinities between the Jōmon and Ancient North Siberians. Other studies found no evidence for ANE-related gene flow or speculated that it was indirectly introduced via admixture with Northern East Asian populations that were admixed with ANE groups themselves. According to Yang et al. (2025), whilst the Jōmon have the lowest Denisovan ancestry among East Asians like West Eurasians, it is not attributed to either West Eurasian or Hoabinhian admixture, which were not found in Jōmon specimens. However, the Jōmon most likely inherited their Denisovan ancestry from the same ancestral populations that ANE-related and Tianyuan-related populations inherited their Denisovan ancestry from. Other studies suggest that Yana-related admixture is mostly found in Hokkaido Jōmon but clarify that "absolute differences in Yana-related drift among Jōmon and other EASs are modest". They might also refect recent admixture with northern populations.

There is also evidence of genetic affinities between the Jōmon and lowland coastal East Asians, which might reflect genetic exchange, but the directionality is unclear. Alternatively, they reflect shared ancestry. Other studies show little to no gene flow from continental Asians (e.g. Austronesians) into the Jōmon, including the Ryukyuan Jōmon. However, there's evidence that Hokkaido and Ryukyuan Jōmon received slightly higher input from continental Northeast Asian-related sources compared to mainland Japanese Jōmon. Overall, the Jōmon are not closely related to most modern Asian populations besides the Ainu, the Ryukyuans, the Japanese and, to a lesser extent, certain coastal indigenous groups of the Amur (the Nivkh and the Ulchi).

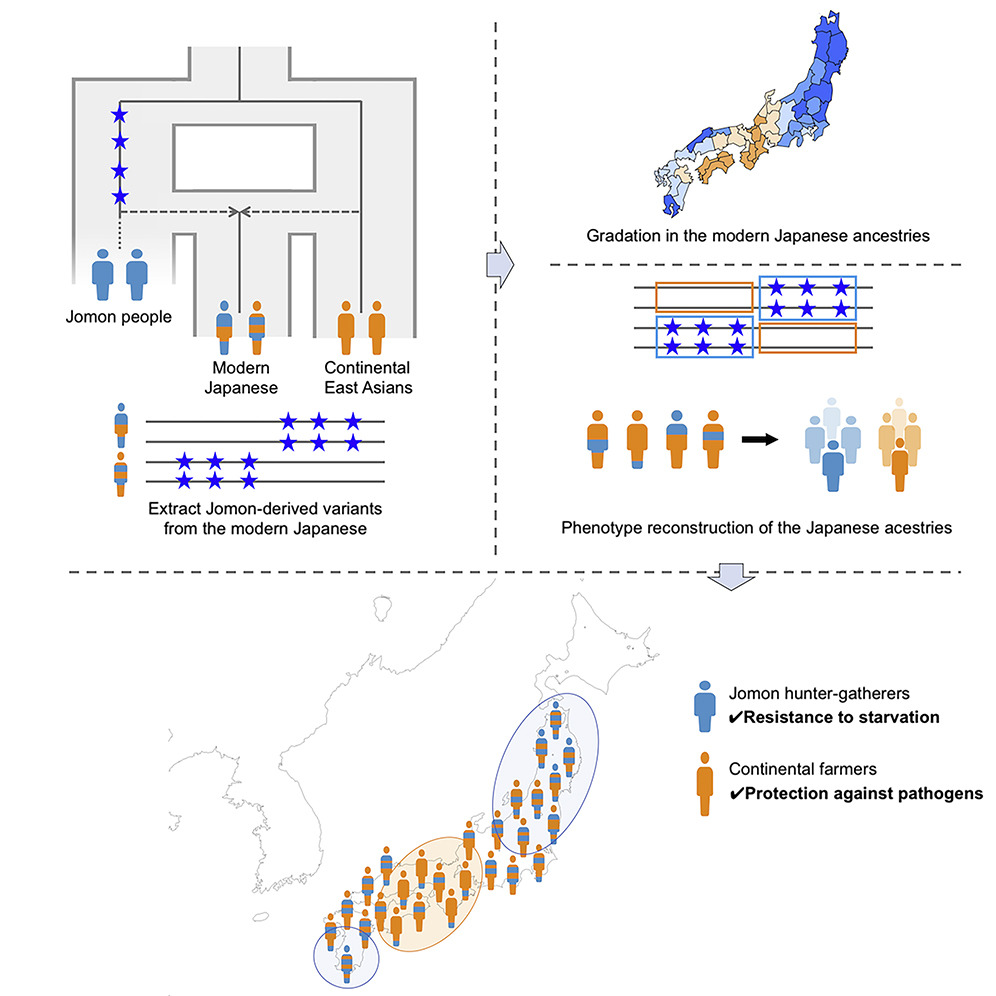
Jōmon and Continental Asian contributions to modern Japanese

Full genome studies on multiple Jōmon remains revealed them to carry gene alleles associated with a higher alcohol tolerance, wet earwax, no derived variant of the EDAR gene, and that they likely frequently consumed fatty sea and land animals. They also carried alleles for medium to light skin, dark and fine/thin hair, and brown eyes. Some samples also displayed a higher risk of developing liver spots as a result of excessive sun exposure. Alleles associated with cold adaptation are also found in the Jōmon, which was not uncommon for other early East Eurasians like the Hoabinhians or Andamanese.

Genetic data further indicates that the Jōmon peoples were genetically predisposed for higher triglyceride and blood sugar levels, increasing the risk of obesity. At the same time, it gave them resistance to starvation. Modern Japanese share these alleles with the Jōmon period population, although at lower and variable frequency, in line with the inferred admixture among modern Japanese peoples. Watanabe et al. stated that the genetic predisposition for shorter stature among Japanese people often correlates with high Jōmon ancestry, with the opposite correlating with high continental East Asian ancestry. However, Yamamoto et al. (2024) stated that the association of Jōmon ancestry with the decrease of height is observable only if principal components are not accounted for in the test, indicating that this association can be confounded by population stratification. They also found indications for an influence on the Body mass index, including a higher risk of obesity among modern Japanese, but also higher frequency of "active functions in skeletal muscle cells" and "increased bone mineral density", which may have been related to the hunter-gatherer lifestyle of the Jōmon people.

==== Haplogroups ====
It is thought that the haplogroups D-M55 (D1a2a) and C1a1 were frequent among the historical Jōmon period people of Japan. One 3,800-year-old Jōmon man excavated from Rebun Island was found to belong to Haplogroup D1a2b1(D-CTS 220). Today, haplogroup D-M55 is found in about 35% and haplogroup C1a1 in about 6% of modern Japanese people. D-M55 is found regularly only in Japanese (Ainu, Ryukyuans, and Yamato) and Koreans (albeit with much lower frequency). D-M55 also has been observed in Micronesia 5.1%, Timor 0.2%, China 0–0.4%, this is explained by recent admixture, dating back to the Japanese empire (1868–1945) occupation of those regions. Haplogroup C1a1 has been found regularly in about 6% of modern Japanese. Elsewhere, it has been observed sporadically in individuals from South Korea, North Korea (South Hwanghae Province), and China (ethnic Korean in Ning'an and Han Chinese in Linghai, Guancheng Hui District, Haigang District, and Dinghai District). A 2021 study estimated that the frequency of the D-M55 clade increased during the late Jōmon period. The divergence between the D1a2-M55 and the D1a-F6251 subclades (the latter of which is common in Tibetans, other Tibeto-Burmese groups, and Altaians, and has a moderate distribution in the rest of East Asia, Southeast Asia, and Central Asia) may have occurred near the Tibetan Plateau.

The MtDNA haplogroup diversity of the Jōmon people is characterized by the presence of haplogroups M7a and N9b. Studies published in 2004 and 2007 show the combined frequency of M7a and N9b observed in modern Japanese to be from 12~15% to 17% in mainstream Japanese. N9b is frequently found among the Hokkaido Jōmon while M7a is found frequently among the Honshu Jōmon. However N9b is found only at very low percentage among the Honshu Jōmon. Both M7a and N9b have coalescent times about 10,000 years ago. Studies have suggested that M7a originated from westward migrations from the Korean peninsula while N9b was introduced from Northeast Asia via Sakhalin and Hokkaido. However, it is likely that these haplogroups were indigenous to the Japanese archipelago, with early Jōmon being "located on branches closer to the root". Haplogroup M7a now has its highest frequency in Okinawa.

Using the Fossa Magna as the boundary line, M7a was more common in western Jōmon while N9b was more common in eastern Jōmon, which can be explained by genetic drift rather than different genetic backgrounds for various Jōmon settlers. Other studies state that M7a was present at all sites in Early Jōmon Japan, whether northern or southern, although N9b was not found at any site below Kyushu. In Middle Jōmon Japan, M7a and N9b were both observed, especially at the Chiba Prefecture. In Late Jōmon Japan, M7a was present in Hokkaido and Okinawa. N9b was common in Funadomari while D4b2 and D4h2 were common in the Shomyoji shell midden and Funadomari respectively. In the Final Jōmon, N9b prevailed in Hokkaido while N9b and M7a were both observed in Honshu. The following sites in Hokkaido have these common haplogroups; G1b at Usu-Moshiri, G1b and D4h2 at Usu-Moshiri, G1b at Minami-Usu 6 and D4h2 at Onkoromanai. According to a 2025 study, haplogroup M7 diverged into M7a and M7b'c, which further split into M7b and M7c, with the latter two being common in Southern East Asia.

=== Morphological characteristics ===
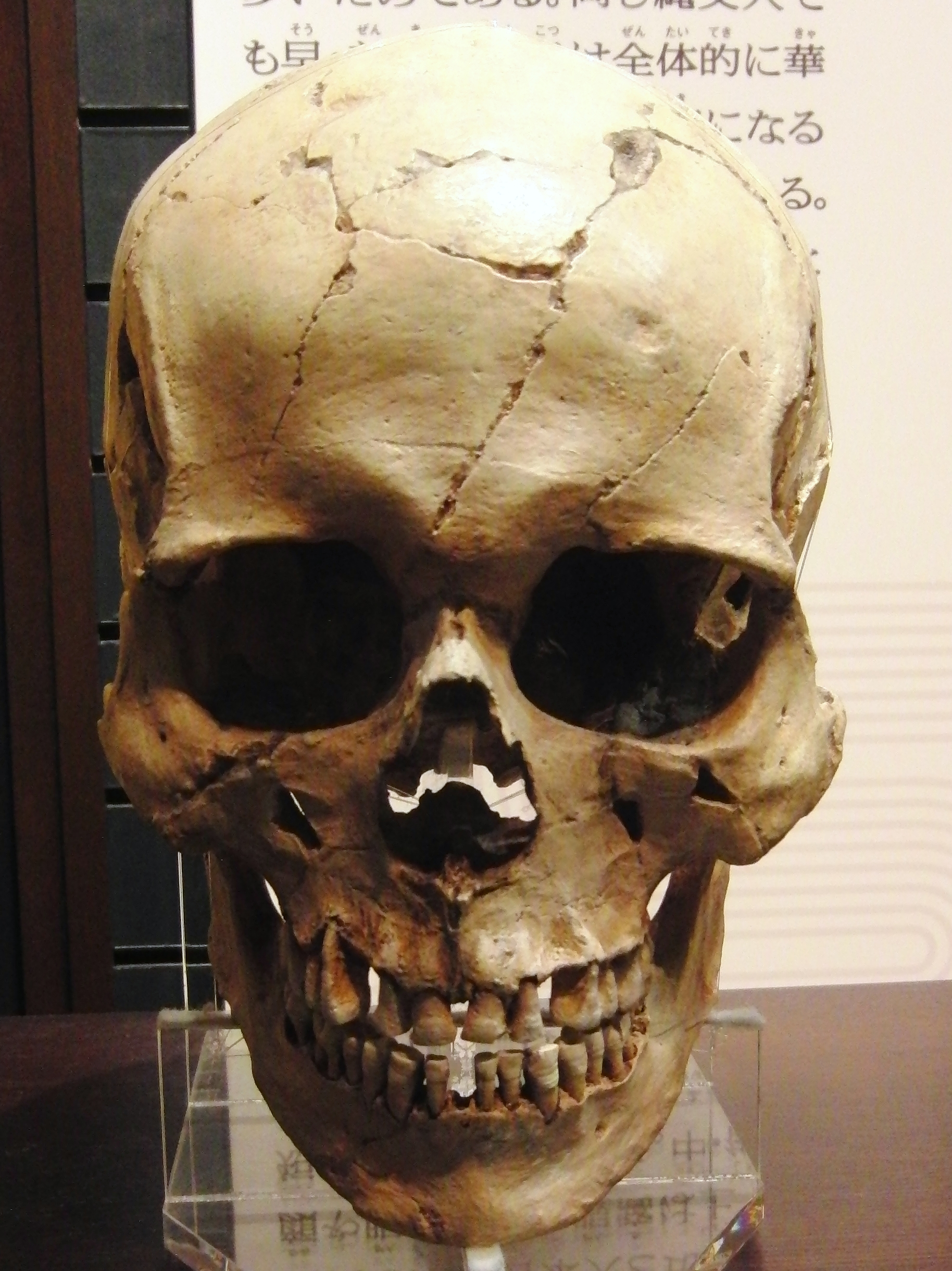
Male skull of the late Jōmon period (replica). Excavated at Miyano Kaizuka (Iwate Prefecture). Exhibition in National Museum of Nature and Science.

Although there is regional variance among different Jōmon remains, they displayed an overall coherent morphology. Historically, the Jōmon people were classified as "South Mongoloid" or "Proto-Mongoloid". The Sakhalin Ainu tooth morphology displayed specific affinities with Native Americans and to an extent, Negrito samples.

They broadly resemble groups such as "[...] Southeast Asians, Upper Paleolithic Asians, or Northeastern Asians, as well as present-day indigenous populations of the Ainu of Hokkaido and Ryukyu Islanders", as well as Cro-Magnon populations. Certain Jōmon features indicate long-term adaptation to a hunter-gatherer lifestyle and to an extent, colder climates. Close morphological similarities also exist between the Jōmon people and the ~33,000 to 23,000 years old Liujiang man from Guangxi, China and the Minatogawa Man from Okinawa.

The Jōmon and Ainu also display phenotypic affinities with putative Australo-Papuan groups and Veddha people, specifically prehistoric populations from Southern East Asia, such as the Hoabinhian hunter-gatherers, and Northern China, such as the Upper Paleolithic Zhoukoudian remains. They possessed traits such as 'dolichocephalic calvaria, large zygomatic bones, remarkably prominent glabellae and superciliary arches, concave nasal roots, and low and wide faces', yet were genetically closer or ancestral to later East Asians despite phenotypic discontinuities. These Paleolithic variations were lost in modern Eastern Asian populations due to long-term demographic replacement.

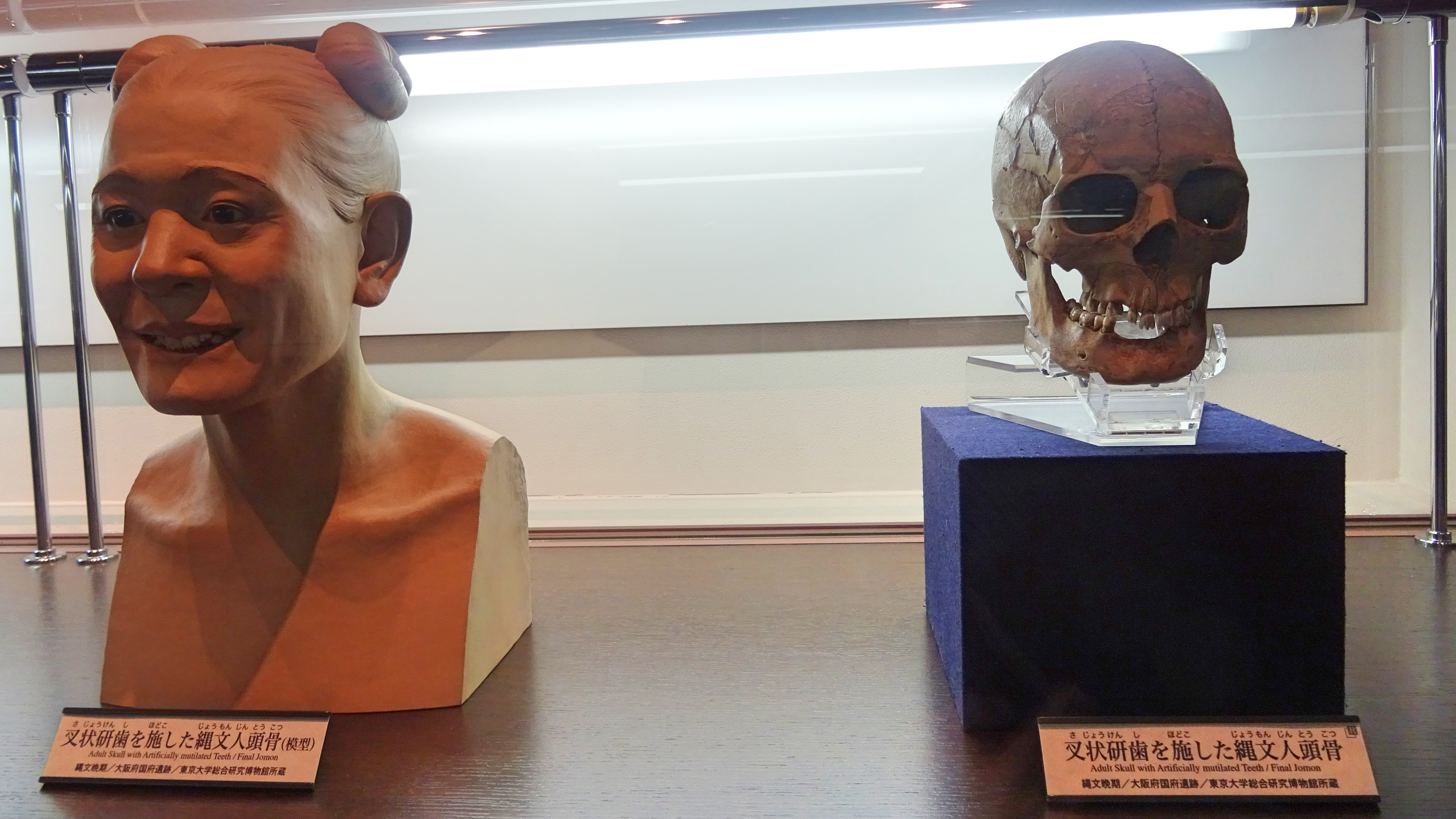
Forensic reconstruction from a Jōmon skull, displayed at Niigata Prefectural Museum of History

Dental morphology suggests that the Jōmon had Sundadont dental structure, which is more common among modern Southeast Asians and indigenous Taiwanese. Sundadonty is ancestral to the Sinodont dental structure commonly found among modern Northeast Asians, suggesting that the Jōmon split from the common "Ancestral East Asians" prior to the formation of modern Northeast Asians.

Chatters, citing anthropologist C. Loring Brace, classified Jōmon and Polynesians as a single craniofacial "Jōmon -Pacific" cluster. Chatters, citing Powell, noted that the Jōmon most resembled the Native American Kennewick Man and Polynesians. According to him, the Ainu descend from the Jōmon people, an East Asian population with "closest biological affinity with south-east Asians rather than western Eurasian peoples".

Kondo et al. analyzed the regional morphological and craniometric characteristics of the Jōmon-era population of Japan, and found that they were morphologically heterogeneous and displayed differences along a Northeast to Southwest cline. Differences were based on the cranial index, with Hokkaido Epi- Jōmon crania being mesocephalic and Okinawan crania being brachycephalic. They concluded that the "Jōmon skulls, especially in the neurocranium, exhibit a discernible level of northeast-to-southwest geographical cline across the Japanese archipelago, placing the Hokkaido and Okinawa samples at both extreme ends. The following scenarios can be hypothesized with caution: (a) the formation of Jōmon population seemed to proceed in eastern or central Japan, not western Japan (Okinawa or Kyushu regions); (b) the Kyushu Jōmon could have a small-sized and isolated population history; and (c) the population history of Hokkaido Jōmon could have been deeply rooted and/or affected by long-term extrinsic gene flows." They also suggested that regional differences in cranial length is based on environmental effects.

According to a 2023 study, there were no significant differences in craniofacial or facial shapes within the Jōmon. However, Southern and Western Jōmon often have more globular neurocraniums when viewed in the sagittal plane compared to Northeastern Honshu Jōmon, who often have high and large frontal regions, along with low, more compressed and angled occipital regions. This reflects a shift towards agricultural lifestyles among Southern and Western Jōmon whilst older forager lifestyles were upheld by Northeastern Honshu Jōmon. Jōmon from Southern and Western Japan and inland central Honshu also differ from Jōmon from coastal central Honshu, Northeastern Honshu and Hokkaido in terms of their temporalis muscle region, reflecting differential influences of plant-based and marine-based diets respectively. The former Jōmon group are described as having "an anteroposteriorly shorter, superoinferiorly taller temporalis region with a mediolaterally narrower temporal fossa". A 2025 study shows no significant inter-phase or geographical differences among different Jōmon specimens. However, variations within phases and geographical regions are more salient.

Craniofacial features of the Jōmon people were significantly retained by the Ainu and Okinawans/Ryukyuans. The Ainu have 2 genes "associated with facial structure in Europeans" but still possessed hair and teeth morphology found in East Asians. Ainu also exhibit strong influence from Northeast Asian populations. Meanwhile, Okinawans/Ryukyuans have a "well-defined and less flat upper face", which is characterized by a prominent glabella and nasal root. Among contemporary Japanese subpopulations, Southern Japanese exhibit strong similarities with Jōmon and Ainu groups, as well as Yayoi groups, and are relatively less impacted by Northeast Asian groups. Other Japanese subpopulations show intermediate affinities with the Jōmon, especially the Hokkaido Ainu, except for Kinki populations, who show the most morphological disparities. Morphological affinities with the Hokkaido Ainu are moderately strong for contemporary Tohoku populations.

==== ATL retrovirus ====
A gene common in Jōmon people is a retrovirus of ATL (human T lymphotropic virus, HTVL-I). This virus was discovered as a cause of adult T cell leukemia (ATL), and research was advanced by Yorio Hinuma of Kyoto University Virus Research Institute.

Although it was known that many virus carriers existed in Japan, it was not found at all in neighboring countries of East Asia. Meanwhile, it has been found in many Africans, Native Americans, Tibetans, Siberians, Burmese people, Indigenous people of New Guinea, Polynesians, etc. Looking at distribution in Japan, it is seen particularly frequently in southern Kyushu, Nagasaki Prefecture, Okinawa and among the Ainu. And it is seen at medium frequency in the southern part of Shikoku, southern part of the Kii Peninsula, the Pacific side of the Tōhoku region (Sanriku) and Oki Islands. Overall, carriers of the ATL retrovirus were found to be more common in remote areas and remote islands. When examining the well-developed areas of ATL in each region of Kyushu, Shikoku, and Tōhoku in detail, carriers are preserved at high rates in small settlements that were isolated from the surroundings and inconvenient for traffic.

The path of natural infection of this virus is limited to vertical infection between women and children (most often through breastfeeding) and horizontal infection between males and females (most often from males to females through sexual intercourse).

Based on the above, Hinuma concluded that the high frequency area of this virus indicates that high density remains of Jōmon people.

=== Contributions to other populations ===
==== Historical groups ====
Full genome analyses of Okhotsk culture remains on Sakhalin show their descent from three major ancestral sources, notably Ancient Northeast Asians, Ancient Paleo-Siberians, and Jōmon people of Japan. An admixture analysis revealed them to carry c. 54% Ancient Northeast Asian, c. 22% Ancient Paleo-Siberian, and c. 24% Jōmon ancestries respectively. Jōmon ancestry is detected in other Far East Siberian individuals such as the 7,000-year-old Letuchaya Mysh individual and an outlier from the Middle Neolithic Boisman population (c. 29.7% ± 9.8%).

Genetic analyses on ancient remains from the southern Korean Peninsula during the Three Kingdoms period reveal elevated Jōmon ancestry at c. 37%, while Yayoi remains in Japan were found to carry nearly equal amounts of Jōmon ancestry (35–60%) and Ancient Northeast Asian-like ancestry (40–65%). These results suggest the presence of the Jōmon people and their culture or a Jōmon-like population on the Korean peninsula and their significant contribution to the formation of early Japonic-speakers. As such, the "agricultural transition in prehistoric Japan involved the process of assimilation, rather than replacement, with almost equal genetic contributions from the indigenous Jōmon and mainland Asian migrants of the Mumun/Yayoi period". The Jōmon-like ancestry in Korea was 'diluted' during the Late Neolithic to Bronze Age periods due to arrivals of West Liao River farmer-related groups from Northeastern China. An analysis of some individuals from Northwestern Kyushu showed that some Yayoi-era individuals had 100% Jōmon ancestry, implying that admixture between Jōmon peoples and continental East Asian migrants was gradual.

The Yokchido individual from ancient Korea is estimated to have 95–100% Jōmon-related ancestry and shows the closest genetic affinities with the Late Jōmon individual from Shikoku, which was also similarly observed for Southern Ryukyuan Jōmon. Several ancient Northeast Asian individuals from inland East Asia (Yumin) and the Devil's Gate Cave (NEO240) can also be modeled as mixtures of deep lineages that are ancestral to the Jōmon and Tianyuan respectively, despite NEO240 being more related to the Jōmon.

==== Modern groups ====
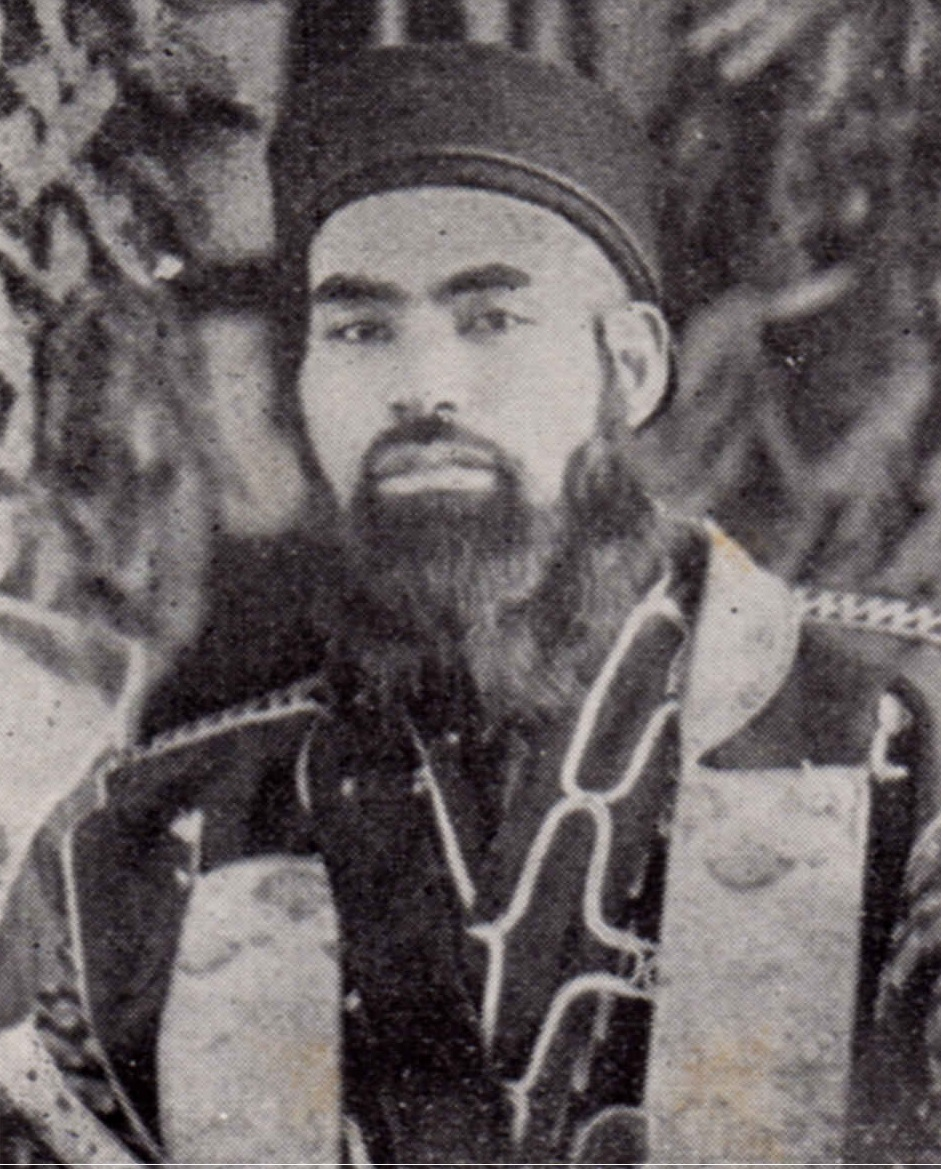
The Ainu are among the modern groups displaying the highest amounts of Jōmon-derived ancestry.

The Ainu have the highest proportion of Jōmon ancestry among modern populations, estimated at up to 70%, followed by the Ryukyuan/Okinawan people at around 30%, and mainland Japanese at approximately 10–20%. Overall, Jōmon ancestry peaks in the northernmost and southernmost parts of Japan (Hokkaido and Okinawa, respectively), followed by Tohoku and Kanto. Residents of Tōhoku, Kantō, and Kyūshū show closer genetic affinities with Ryukyuans. Genetic relatedness between the Ainu and mainland Japanese is likewise strong in western Hokkaidō and Aomori. It is also believed that mainland Japanese primarily derive their Jōmon ancestry from western Jōmon populations. Conversely, Jōmon ancestry is the lowest in Kinki and Shikoku, where Yayoi ancestry is more dominant. Yamamoto et al. 2024 found a wide range of Jōmon ancestry within different Japanese subgroups, ranging from 10–32%. According to a 2025 study, mainland Japanese derive ~20% of their ancestry from Jōmon peoples and are especially close to Early and Middle Jōmon specimens from Kumamoto and Tokyo respectively.

In modern Koreans, Jōmon ancestry is present at about 5%. Jōmon-related ancestry is also present in several Siberian (particularly in the Ulchi at 7% and Nivkh at 10%) and Southeast Asian groups.

== In popular culture ==
Aspects of the Jōmon culture and pottery were used in the video game The Legend of Zelda: Breath of the Wild. The art director of Nintendo Takizawa Satoru said that the Jōmon culture was the inspiration for the "Sheikah Slates, shrines and other ancient objects" in the game.

A recreated Jōmon village in the form of an experience park (Sarashina no Sato), which offers different activities, can be visited in Chikuma, Nagano.

== See also ==
- History of Japan
- Yayoi people
- Yamato people
- Okhotsk culture
- Satsumon culture
- Emishi
- Indigenous peoples of the Americas
- Two layer hypothesis
