= Ōgushi Shell Mound =

Historic site in Japan

Ōgushi Shell Midden
- 大串貝塚 (Japanese)
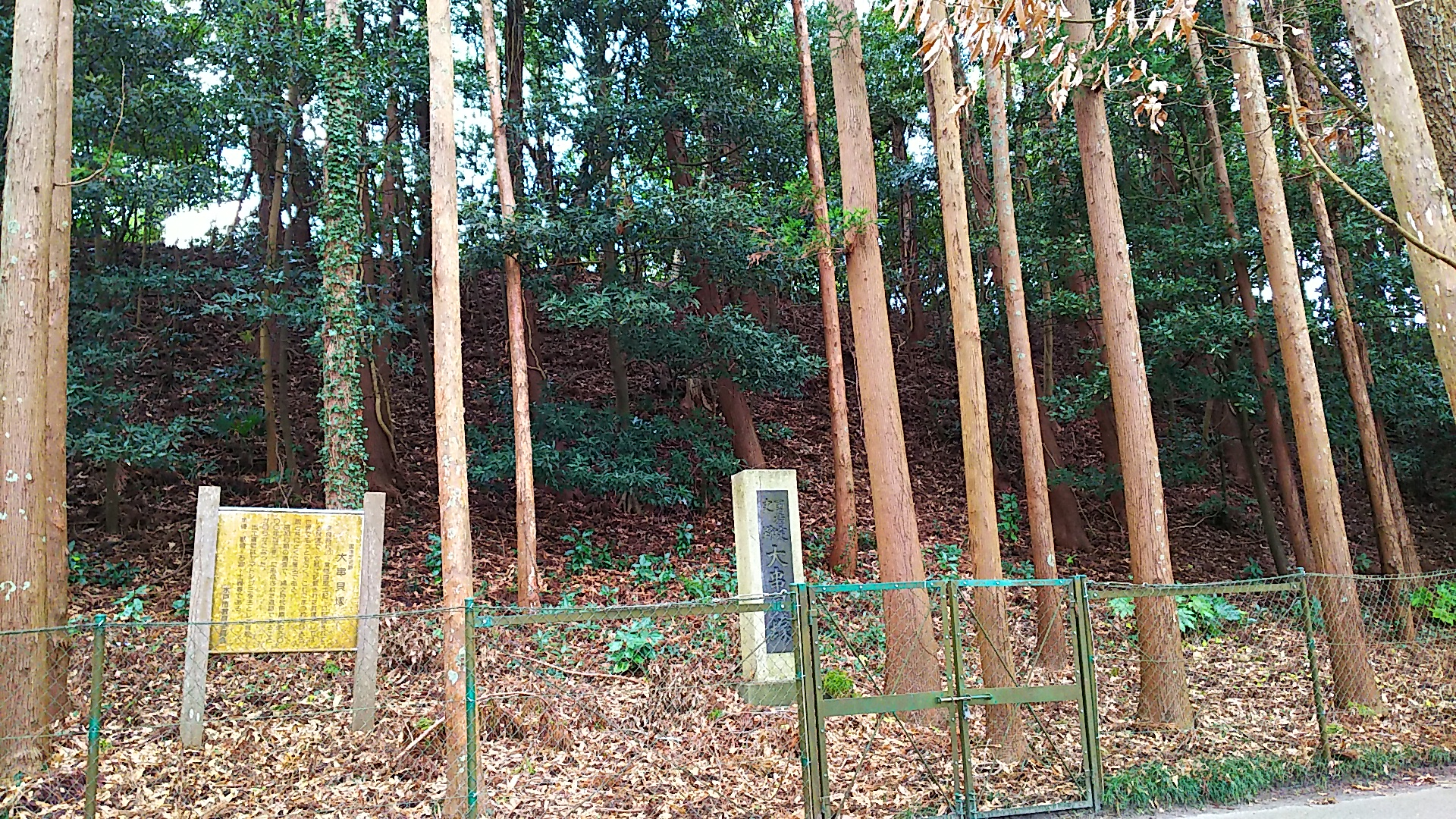
- Ōgushi Shell Midden

- Ōgushi Shell Midden Ōgushi Shell Mound (Japan)
- 36°20′00″N 140°32′57″E
- Type: shell midden
- Periods: Jōmon period
- Location: Mito, Ibaraki, Japan
- Region: Kantō region

Site notes
- Excavation dates: 1936
- Public access: Yes (park and museum)

The Ōgushi Shell Midden (大串貝塚, Ōgushi kaizuka) is an archaeological site in the Shiozaki area of the city of Mito, Ibaraki Prefecture, in the northern Kantō region of Japan containing a Jōmon period shell midden. The site was designated a National Historic Site of Japan in 1970.

== Overview ==
During the early to middle Jōmon period (approximately 4000 to 2500 BC), sea levels were five to six meters higher than at present, and the ambient temperature was also 2 deg C higher. During this period, the coastal regions of Japan were inhabited by the Jōmon people in small settlements. The middens associated with such settlements contain bone, botanical material, mollusc shells, sherds, lithics, and other artifacts and ecofacts associated with the now-vanished inhabitants, and these features, provide a useful source into the diets and habits of Jōmon society. Most of these middens are found along the Pacific coast of Japan.

This shell midden is located at the tip of a plateau with a height of about 15 meters that protrudes like a peninsula in the alluvial plain formed by the Naka River and the Hinuma River. From 1936 it was excavated and Jōmon pottery, stone tools, and bone implements were discovered along with clam shells from both fresh water and seawater clams. These artifacts have been dated to the early Jōmon period. The Ōkushi Shell Midden has been known since ancient times, and per legend described in the Nara period "Hitachi no Kuni fudoki" was the home of a giant who reached out to the sea from this mound, picking and eating clams. This is the oldest record of a shell mound in ancient literature. In 1970, 1703 square meters of the eastern slope, which was well preserved, was designated as a national historic site.

Currently, the area is maintained as the Ōgushi Kaizuka Fureai Park (大串貝塚ふれあい公園, Ōgushi kaidzuka fureai kōen), with a number of reconstructed pit dwellings a small museum showing a cross-section of the midden and a 15-meter-high giant statue of the giant in the legend. The park can be reached by the Ibaraki Kōtsu bus from Mito Station.

== Gallery ==
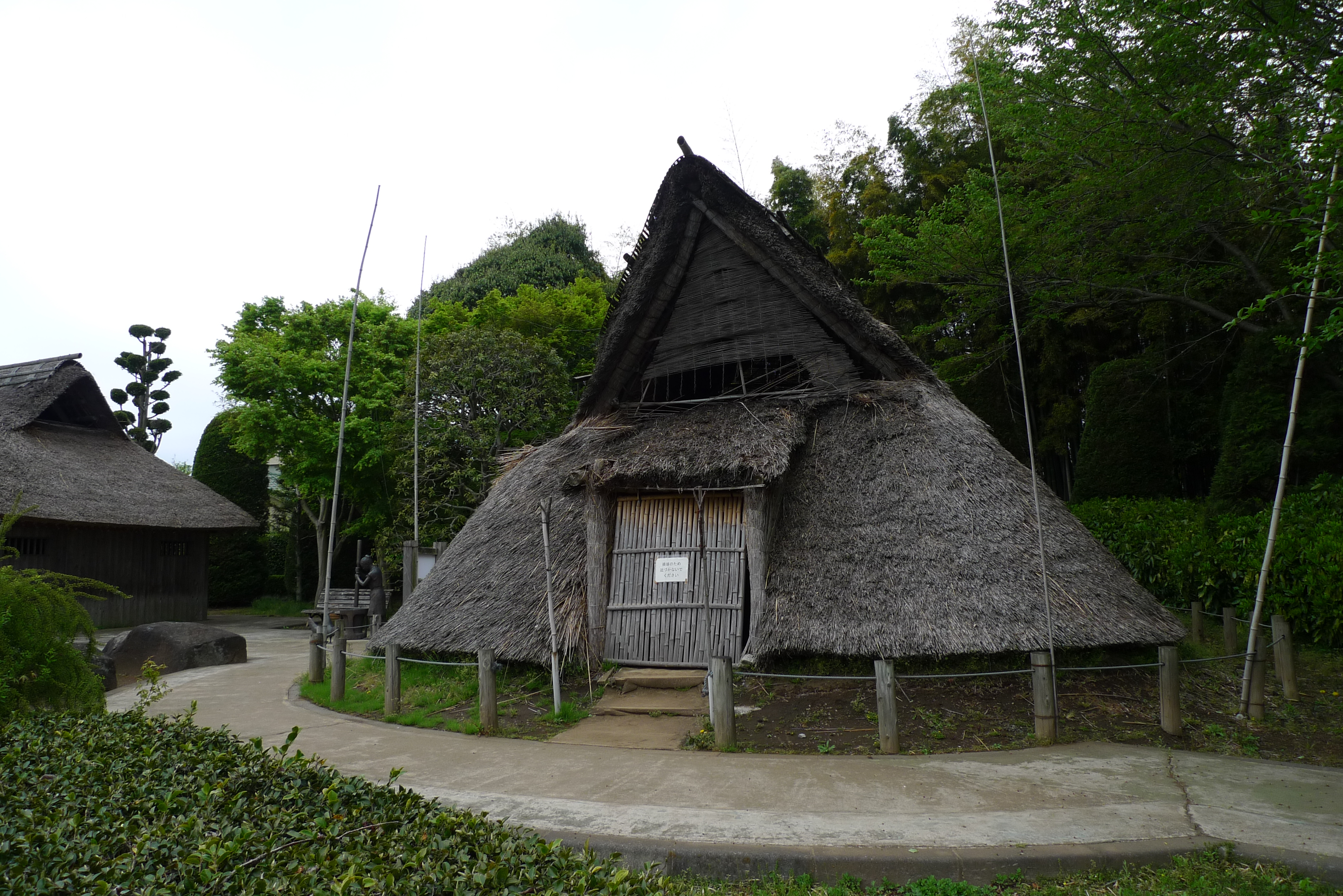
Reconstructed pit dwelling

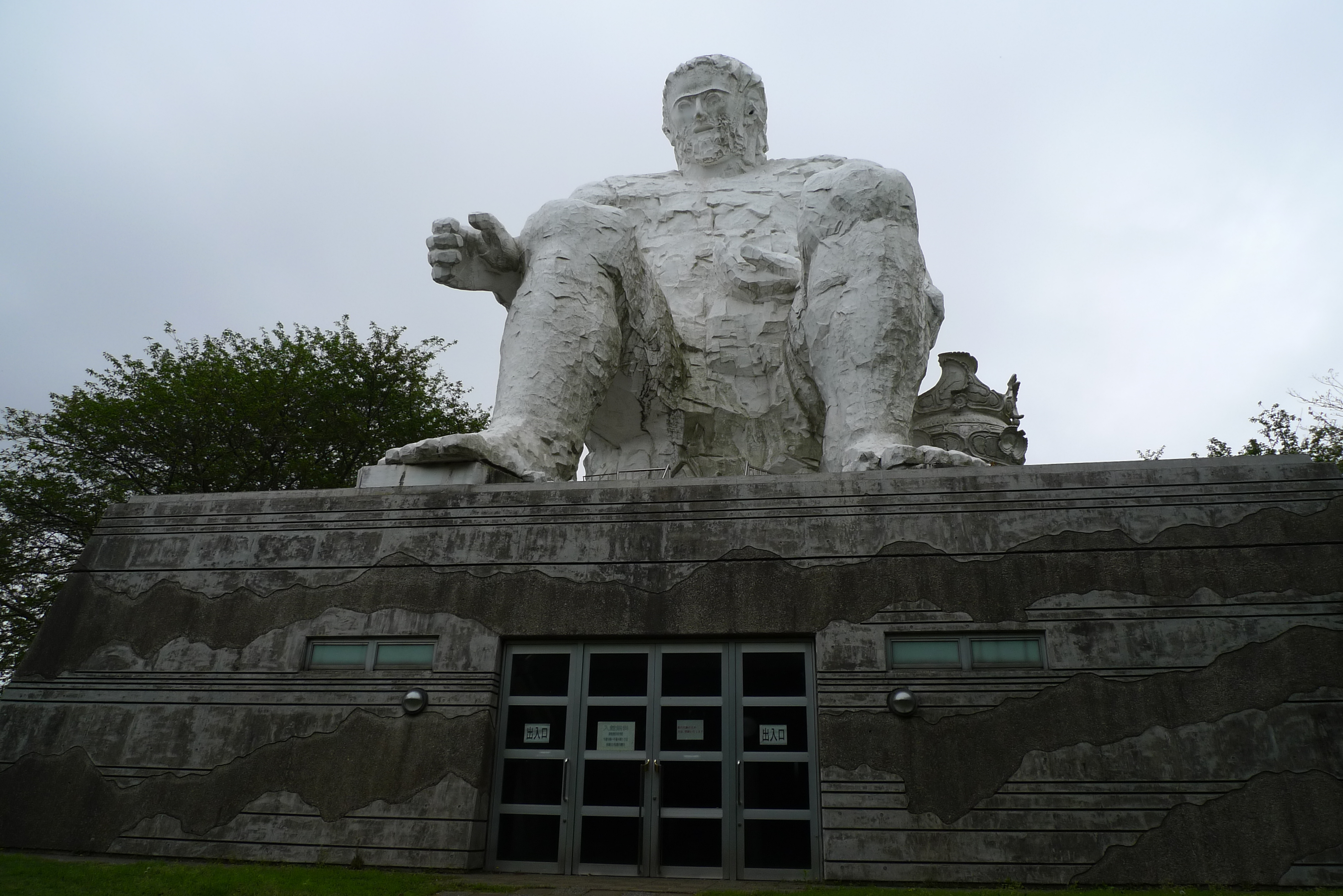
Statue of legendary giant

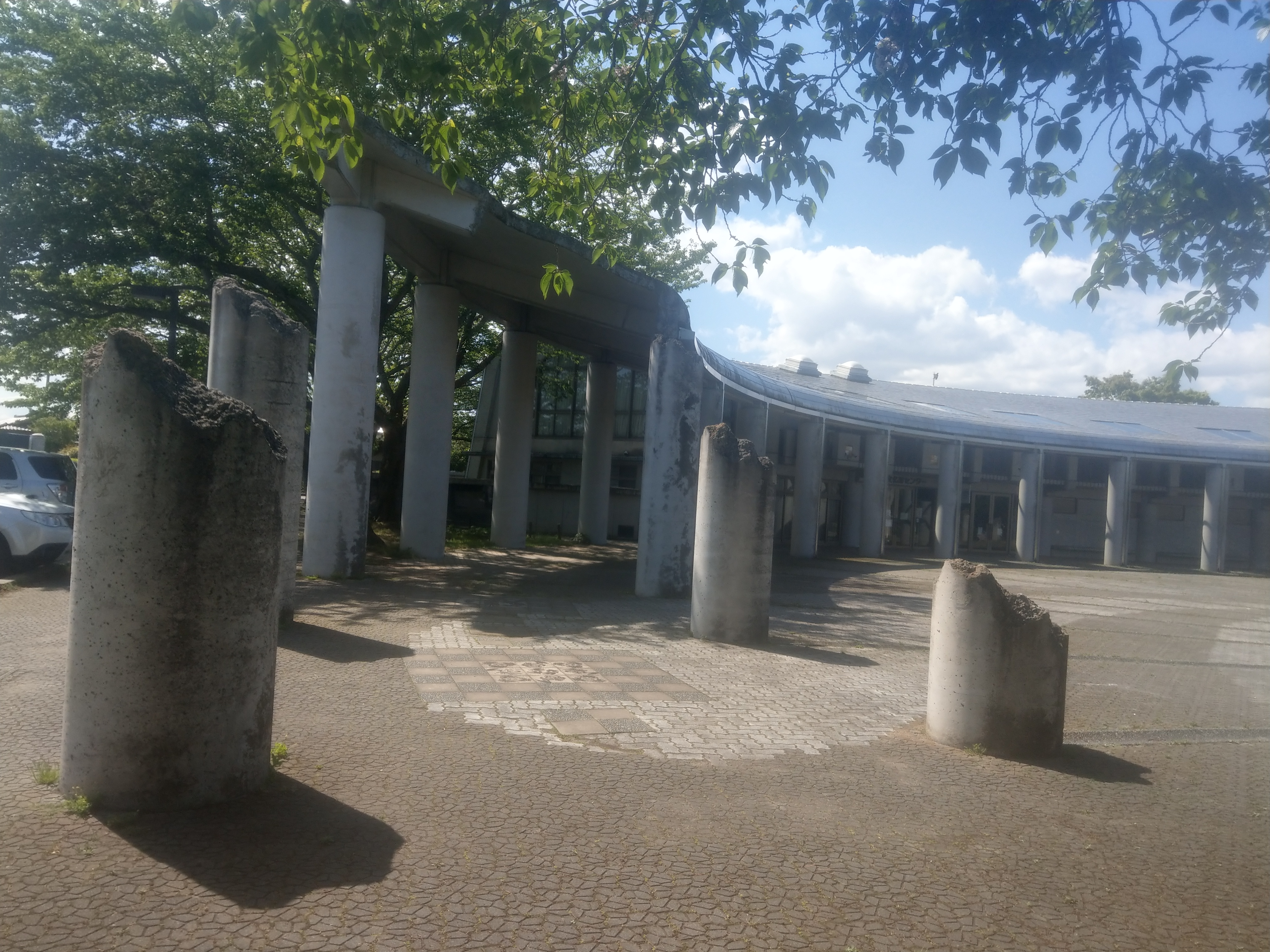
Buried Cultural Property Center

== See also ==
- List of Historic Sites of Japan (Ibaraki)
