= Aburatsubo =

Coordinates: 35°9′36.77″N 139°37′1.91″E

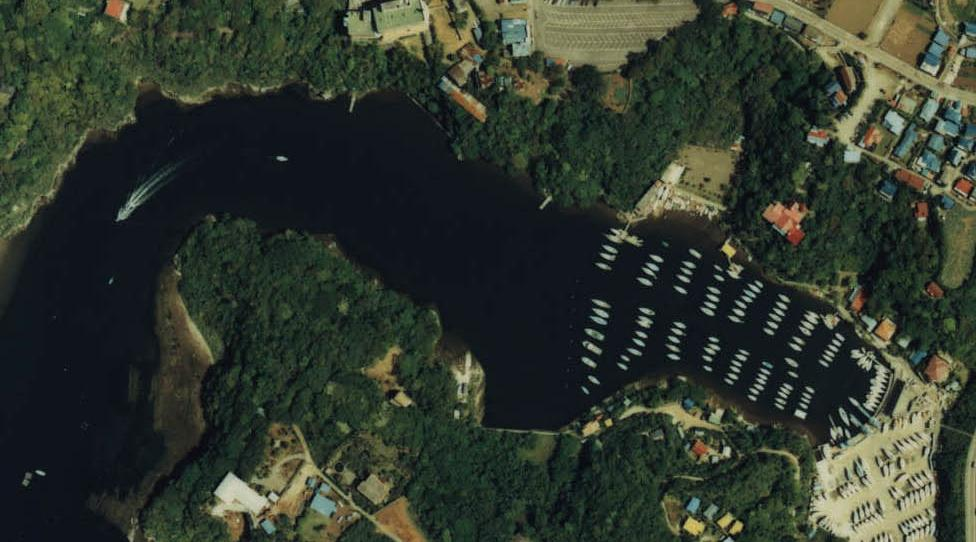
Skyview of Aburatsubo.

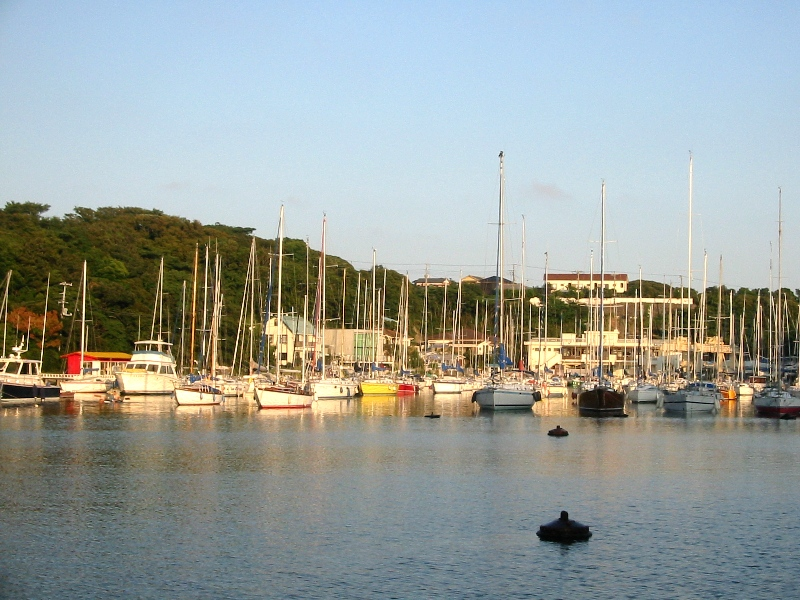
Boats in Aburatsubo

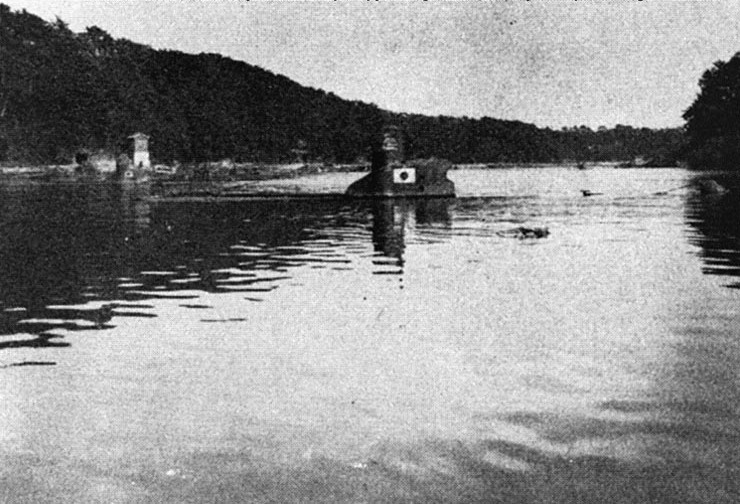
A Kairyu "Sea Dragon" pocket submarine in the Aburatsubo inlet in 1945

Aburatsubo (油壺) is an inlet on the west side of the Miura Peninsula in Kanagawa, Japan, facing Sagami Bay on the Pacific Ocean. It exits into neighbouring Moroiso inlet.

== History ==
During historic times, the Aburatsubo inlet was selected by the feudal Miura family to build a series of fortifications, with Arai castle at its center. During the Sengoku period, the castle fell after a 3-year siege to the rival Later Hōjō clan, in the year 1516. The Hōjō later managed to unify most of the Kantō.

According to some stories, the name Aburatsubo ("Oil Vase"), comes from the time when hundreds of samurai, fleeing the troops of Hōjō, drowned in the waters of the inlet and left it a sea of blood.

== Aburatsubo today ==
Aburatsubo is a "hurricane hole" where fishing boats from the area take refuge when a typhoon arrives. The calm, protected waters of the inlet suggest they are the actual reason behind the name "Aburatsubo". Regardless of the reason, the adjacent Shirahige shrine, dedicated to Fukurojin, was built as thanks for the inlet's calmness.
