= Silver vine =

Silver vine is a common name for either of the following plants:

- Actinidia polygama, found in the mountainous areas of Japan and China at elevations between 500 and 1900 m
- Scindapsus pictus, native to Borneo and Indonesia
