= North China (disambiguation) =

North China is a geographical region of China.

Northern China or North China may also refer to:

- the northern part of China proper, see Northern and southern China
- North China craton, an ancient continent studied in geology
- North China Plain
- Northern and Southern dynasties, a period in the history of China that lasted from 420 to 589

Northern Chinese may refer to Mandarin Chinese, a Sinitic language originating from Northern China

== See also ==
- Northwest China
- Northeast China
